= Waslah =

A wasla (Arabic: وَصْلَة / ALA-LC: waṣlah; plural وَصَلَات / waṣalāt) is a set of pieces in Arabic music. It comprises eight or more movements such as muwashshah, taqsim, layali, mawwal, qasida, dawr, sama'i, bashraf, dulab, and popular songs.

The term is also used to refer to a segment of Sufi music.

== See also ==
- Fasıl
