= List of composers of classical Turkish music =

This is a list of Classical Turkish Music composers in alphabetical order:

== A ==
- Abdurrahman Bahir Efendi (Arabzade) - 1746
- Abdülkadir Meragi - 1435
- Ahmet Uzel
- Ahmet Yektâ Madran - 1865
- Ali Şir Nevai - 1501
- Aziz Mahmud Hudayi - 1628

== B ==
- Bekir Büyükarkın
- Bestâmi Yazgan
- Beşir Ayvazoğlu
- Bîmen Şen
- Bolâhenk Nuri Bey
- Buhûrizâde Abdülkerim Efendi

== C ==
- Cinuçen Tanrıkorur - 2001

== D ==
- Dimitrie Cantemir - (1673 - 1723)

== H ==
- Hafız Post - 1693
- Hacı Arif Bey
- Hampartsoum Limondjian
- Hüseyin Baykara - 1506

== I ==
- Buhurizade Mustafa Itri - 1712
- İsmail Dede Efendi - (1778 - 1846)

== K ==
- Kâni Karaca - 2004
- Kantemiroğlu - 1727

== L ==
- Leyla Saz - 1936

== M ==
- Mesut Cemil - 1945
- Muzaffer Ozak - 1984
- Münir Nurettin Selçuk - 1981

== N ==
- Necdet Yaşar - 2017

== R ==
- Rauf Yekta Bey - 1935

== S ==
- Sadettin Kaynak
- Selim III
- Şerif Muhiddin Targan - 1967

== T ==
- Tamburi Cemil Bey - 1916
- Tatyos Efendi - 1913
