= Kemani Tatyos Ekserciyan =

Armenian-Ottoman composer (1858–1913)

Tatyos Ekserciyan
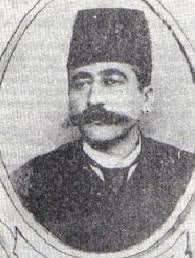
- Born: Tatyos; 1858; Istanbul, Ottoman Empire
- Died: 16 March 1913 (aged 55); Istanbul, Ottoman Empire

Tatyos Ekserciyan (Թադեոս Էքսէրճեան), or Tatyos Efendi, was a famous composer of classical Turkish music, and his works continue to be among the most played and revered examples of the genre.

An Armenian from Istanbul, Tatyos Efendi was born in 1858 in the Ortaköy district of Istanbul as the son of Manug Aga, an amateur musician at the Ortaköy Armenian Church. Tatyos Efendi's family had a minor trading business and when he finished the Ortaköy Armenian Elementary School, he started an apprenticeship at a locksmith and later became an apprentice at a savat workshop (a traditional form of silver work). Due to his deep interest in music, Tatyos Efendi left his apprenticeship and bought a second hand kanun to receive his first music lessons from his uncle Movses Papazyan. He played the kanun with amateur groups and musical meetings in a family setting. Later, he took violin lessons from Kemani Kör Sebuh and lessons in singing and theory from Andon and Civan brothers and singer Asdik Aga. He conducted many fasıl concerts in various places including the Pirincci Gazino with artists like Karakaş, Ovakim and Şemsi. He composed many popular songs and instrumental works for fasıl.

Tatyos Efendi co-performed with many famous musicians of his time like Ahmed Rasim Bey, Civan and Andon brothers, Şevki Bey, Kemenceci Vasilaki and Tanburi Cemil Bey. His successful instrumental works show the influence of these co-performances. A poet as well as a composer, he often wrote the lyrics of most of his works. Tatyos Efendi's compositions successfully reflect the traditional aspects of the melodic forms and are a testimony to his superior understanding of the structure of Turkish classical music. The musicians that learned from him include Arşak Çömlekçiyan, Münir Mazhar Kamsoy, Nasibin Mehmet Yürü, Mustafa Sunar and Abdülkadir Töre.

The composer spent his last years alone in misery. His health ailing due to too much alcohol, he was alone except for the company of a few dedicated friends like Ahmed Rasim Bey. He died of cirrhosis of the liver on March 16, 1913 and Ahmed Rasim Bey gathered a dozen or so friends for his funeral and had him buried in the Kadıköy Armenian cemetery.

Although especially famous for his command of musical notation and able to take down a tune to paper immediately at first hearing, many of Tatyos Efendi's works were not written down and were lost in time. His surviving works are the peşrevs in the Karcığar, Suznak, and Rast makams, the saz semai in the Hüseyni, Süznak, and Rast makams, and more than fifty songs in various makams.

== Works ==
List of works by Tatyos Efendi:

| Makam (mode) | Genre | Name of the Piece | Usul (rhythm) |
|---|---|---|---|
| Bestenigar | Peşrev | Bestenigar Peşrev | Fahte |
| Hicaz | Şarkı | Bilsen ne bela geçti şu bi–çare serimden | Sengin Semai |
| Hicaz | Şarkı | Gülşen–ı zevk–ı hayatın şimdi mehcurlardan | Ağır Aksak |
| Hicaz | Şarkı | Nev–bahar–ı dehr içinde harsız gül mü olur | Aksak |
| Hicaz | Şarkı | Neydi maksudun senin bu hale koymaktan | Aksak |
| Hicaz | Şarkı | Şu mahzun gönlümü yar şad eylesin | Curcuna |
| Hicazkar | Şarkı | Ben çare ararken dil–ı bi–çareye senden | Sengin Semai |
| Hicazkar | Şarkı | Mani oluyor halimi takrire hicabım | Curcuna |
| Hicazkar | Şarkı | Tir–ı çeşmin ta ciğer–gahımda hançerler vur | Ağır Aksak |
| Hicazkar | Şarkı | Yok mudur ey mah–peyker zerre insafın ban | Türk Aksağı |
| Hüseyni | Şarkı | Çektim elimi gayrı bu dünya hevesinden | Curcuna |
| Hüseyni | Şarkı | Gönül düştü yine gülzar–ı zevka | Curcuna |
| Hüseyni | Peşrev | Hüseyni Peşrev | Devr–i Kebir |
| Hüseyni | Saz Semai | Hüseyni Saz Semaisi | Aksak Semai |
| Hüseyni | Şarkı | Meskenim kuşe–ı zillet olalı şam–u seher | Aksak |
| Hüseyni | Şarkı | Ölürüm terk edemem ey gül–ı nev–reste seni | Curcuna |
| Hüseyni | Şarkı | Sakı–ı bezm–ı elest–ı ruh iken şirin–güvar | Düyek |
| Hüseyni–Aşîran | Saz Semai | Hüseyni–Aşiran Saz Semaisi | Aksak Semai |
| Hüzzam | Şarkı | Açtım yüzünü talat–ı didarına baktım | Curcuna |
| Hüzzam | Şarkı | Gözüm hasretle giryandır | Aksak |
| Isfahan | Şarkı | Akl–u sabrım gitti mahzun oldum ah | Aksak |
| Karcığar | Şarkı | A gözüm bakma hevayi sözüne | Aksak |
| Karcığar | Şarkı | Göz süzüp yan bakışınlaa yine aldatma beni | Aksak |
| Karcığar | Şarkı | Güldün eğlendin perişan hal–u kaalimle bug | Ağır Aksak |
| Karcığar | Şarkı | Hatırım rahatsız etmezse seni | Curcuna |
| Karcığar | Peşrev | Karciğar Peşrev | Çifte Düyek |
| Karcığar | Saz Semai | Karciğar Saz Semaisi | Aksak Semai |
| Karcığar | Şarkı | Kemend–ı zülf esiri zülf–ı yar oldum | Aksak |
| Karcığar | Beste | O mah–tabı aceb gösterir mi bana felek | Zencir |
| Karcığar | Şarkı | Söyle çeşm–ı ela sen nur–ı imanım mısın | Ağır Aksak |
| Kürdilihicazkâr | Şarkı | Ehl–ı aşkın neşvegahı kuşe–ı meyhanedir | Ağır Aksak |
| Kürdilihicazkâr | Şarkı | Hoş geçen eyyamı cana her nefes ah özlerim | Aksak |
| Kürdilihicazkâr | Şarkı | İltiyam–ı zahm–ı aşkın ah doktor çaresi | Aksak |
| Kürdilihicazkâr | Peşrev | Kürdi'li Hicazkar Peşrev | Devr–i Kebir |
| Kürdilihicazkâr | Saz Semai | Kürdi'li Hicazkar Saz Semaisi | Aksak Semai |
| Kürdilihicazkâr | Şarkı | Sohbetinle hoş geçen eyyamı cana özlerim | Aksak |
| Muhayyer | Şarkı | Uyandı bahtım artık etmem şekva felekten | Sengin Semai |
| Müstear | Şarkı | Tağyir olunmuş guya havası | Türk Aksağı |
| Neva'da Uşşak | Şarkı | Gam–zedeyim deva bulmam | Sofyan |
| Nihavend | Şarkı | Cana firkatinle sinemi ben dağlarım | Aksak |
| Nihavend | Şarkı | Geçtikçe demler sehharelendi | Sengin Semai |
| Nihavend | Şarkı | Meftunu gönül oldu o şuhane nigahın | Sengin Semai |
| Rast | Şarkı | Beni dilgir ederken ah visali | Aksak |
| Rast | Şarkı | Bir gönlüme bir hal–ı perişanıma baktım | Sengin Semai |
| Rast | Şarkı | Çeşm–ı celladın ne kanlar döktü | Kağıdhane Ağır Aksak |
| Rast | Şarkı | İftirak–ıy can kederinle senin ey gül–beden | Ağır Aksak |
| Rast | Şarkı | Mavi atlaslar giyersin | Türk Aksağı |
| Rast | Şarkı | Mey–ı lalinle dil mestane olsun | Curcuna |
| Rast | Peşrev | Rast Peşrev | Düyek |
| Rast | Saz Semai | Rast Saz Semaisi | Aksak Semai |
| Segah | Şarkı | Nice feryad edeyim ah aşk senden | Aksak |
| Suzinak | Şarkı | Afet misin ey hüsn–i mücessem bu ne halet | Sengin Semai |
| Suzinak | Şarkı | Atf etme sakın hançer–ı müjganını nagah | Sengin Semai |
| Suzinak | Şarkı | Cevher–ı ruhum musun ey melek | Aksak |
| Suzinak | Şarkı | Çeşm–ı celladı boyandı girdi artık kaanıma | Ağır Aksak |
| Suzinak | Şarkı | Efendim nev–civanımsın | Sengin Semai |
| Suzinak | Şarkı | Gel ela gözlüm efendim yanıma | Müsemmen |
| Suzinak | Şarkı | Gülşen–ı zevk–ıy hayatın şimdi mehcurlarda | Ağır Aksak |
| Suzinak | Şarkı | Güzelim gözlüğünü çeşmine tak | Aksak |
| Suzinak | Şarkı | Hasretinle gün–be–gün olmakta halim ah bet | Curcuna |
| Suzinak | Peşrev | Suzinak Peşrev | Çenber |
| Suzinak | Saz Semai | Suzinak Saz Semaisi | Aksak Semai |
| Suzinak | Şarkı | Suznak–ı ateş–ı gam yetiş feryada gel | Aksak |
| Suzinak | Şarkı | Suznak–ı fasl–ı aşkın söyleyim dinle yeter | Aksak |
| Şehnaz | Şarkı | Sevdi bir şuh–ı cihanı kim gönül | Devr–i Hindi |
| Uşşak | Şarkı | Bu akşam gün batarken gel | Aksak |
| Uşşak | Şarkı | Nail–ı vuslat olan zinet–ı dünya bilmez | Müsemmen |
| Uşşak | Şarkı | Ol kadar ağlattın ki gülmek bana oldu haram | Ağır Aksak |
| Uşşak | Şarkı | Rahmi yok bir yare düştüm el–aman gonca | Ağır Aksak |
| Uşşak | Şarkı | Ruhum musun ey ruh–ı safa–bahş–ı cihanın | Türk Aksağı |
| Uşşak | Peşrev | Uşşak Peşrev | Devr–i Kebir |
| Uşşak | Saz Semai | Uşşak Saz Semaisi | Aksak Semai |
