= Beste (Turkish music) =

Vocal genre in Ottoman classical music

The beste is a vocal genre in Ottoman classical music. It was a movement of the fasıl, or suite.

Beste was one of the main forms of fasil (along with semâ'î), and its lyrics came from the Ottoman Turkish language poetry forms gazel and murabba.
