= Bedriye Hoşgör =

Turkish composer

- Born: 1889; Konya, Ottoman Empire
- Died: 1968 (aged 78–79) Istanbul, Turkey
- Genres: Ottoman classical music, Turkish makam music
- Occupation: composer

Bedriye Hoşgör was a Turkish composer.

Hoşgör was influenced by the tekke music tradition as a child growing up in Konya. After she and her family moved to Istanbul, Hoşgör took oud lessons from Enderunlu İsmet Efendi and Udi Afet and usul lessons from Halit Bey, a muezzin at the palace. Hoşgör also worked with Tanburi Cemil Bey whom she had met at a social gathering. Cemil Bey encouraged Hoşgör to enroll in the "Darülbedayî-i Musik-î Osmanî" school where she greatly expanded her knowledge of music. Hoşgör also worked with Udi Nevres Bey.

== See also ==
- List of composers of classical Turkish music
