= Buhurizade Mustafa Itri =

Turkish musician, composer, singer and poet

Buhurizade Mustafa Itri Efendi
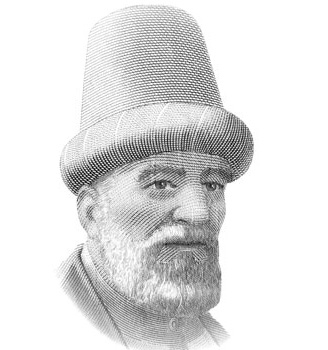
- Depiction of Itri from reverse of the 100 Turkish Lira banknote.

Background information
- Born: 1640; Istanbul, Ottoman Empire
- Died: 1712 Istanbul, Ottoman Empire
- Genres: Ottoman music
- Occupation(s): Composer, poet, calligrapher

Mustafa Itri, more commonly known as Buhurizade Mustafa Itri, or just simply Itri (1640–1712), was an Ottoman-Turkish musician, composer, singer and poet. With over a thousand works to his name, although only about 40 of these have survived to this day, he is regarded as the master of Turkish classical music. In 2012, due to the 300th anniversary of Itri's death, the UNESCO declared 2012 the "International Itri Year".

== Biography ==
Many things known about him today are subject to dispute. His real name was Mustafa, and he was sometimes referred to as Buhurizade Mustafa Efendi. Itri was a major exponent of Turkish classical music. He was a very prolific composer with more than a thousand works. However, only about 40 of these survived to this day, the rest being lost.

It is believed that he was a Mevlevi, and composed religious music for this order. He lived through the times of five Ottoman Sultans. He became well known during the time of Mehmet IV. He sang in fasıls, which are concert programs with the same makam, in the presence of Mehmet IV. Starting from this time, he enjoyed the support of the palace for many years. He taught music in the palace Enderun school. He was also interested in gardening. It is believed that his name Itri comes from the word itir, which means pelargonium.

As with most composers of his day, Itri was also a famous poet. He used poetic forms based on the classical Ottoman school of poetry (Divan), as well as those based on syllabic meters identified with folk music and poetry. Unfortunately most of his poetry has not survived to this day. He was also known for being a calligrapher.

Itri's portrait is depicted on the reverse of the Turkish 100 lira banknote issued in 2009.

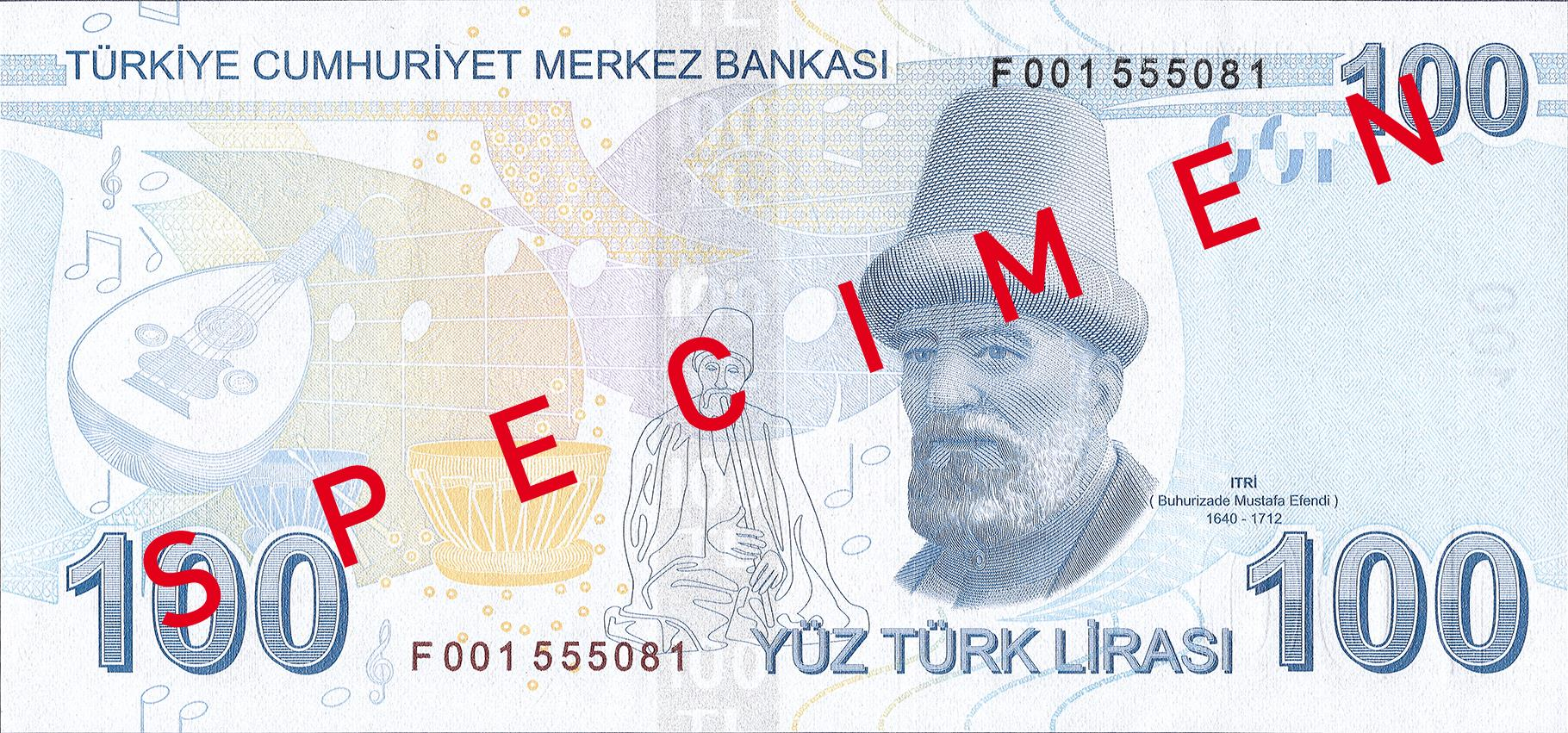
Reverse of the 100 lira (2009)

== Major works ==
- Segâh Kurban Bayramı Tekbiri
- Segâh Salât-ı Ümmiye
- Dilkeşhâveran Gece Salâtı
- Mâye Cuma Salâtı
- Segâh Mevlevi Ayini
- Rast Darb-ı Türkî Naat ve Sofyan Tevşih
- Nühüft Durak; Nühüft İlahî
- Nühüft Tevşih; Nevâ Kâr
- 2 Pençgâh Beste
- Hisar Devr-i Kebir Beste ve Aksak Semai
- Mâhûr Ağır Aksak Semai
- Rehavî Berefşan Beste
- Buselik Hafif Beste ve Yürük Semai
- Segâh Ağır Semai
- Segâh Yürük Semai
- Bayatî Çember Beste
- Bestenigâr Darb-ı Fetih Beste
- Dügâh Hafif Beste
- Isfahan Zencir Beste ve Ağır Aksak Semai
- Nikriz Muhammes Beste
- Râhatu'l Ervah Zencir Beste
- Irak Aksak Semai
- Rast Aksak Semai
- Nühüft Aksak Semai
- Acemaşiran Yürük Semai
- Rehavî Peşrev
- Nühüft Peşrev ve Saz Semaisi
- Nevâ Kâr
