= Semahat Özdenses =

Turkish singer and composer

- Born: 28 July 1913; Üsküdar, Constantinople, Ottoman Empire
- Died: 3 July 2008 (aged 94) Istanbul, Turkey
- Genres: Ottoman classical, Turkish folk
- Occupations: Singer, composer
- Labels: Odeon Records

Semahat Özdenses (28 July 1913 – 3 July 2008) was a Turkish singer and composer of Ottoman classical music. She was a recipient of the "Culture and Arts Service Award" of Turkey.

== Private life ==
Semahat Özdenses was born in the Üsküdar district of Istanbul on 29 July 1913. Her father İshak was a captain in the Ottoman Army; her mother's name was Pakize. Her father fell during the Gallipoli campaign (1915–1916).

Özdenses enrolled in the Arts School for Girls in Üsküdar, but did not complete her education due to her passion for music. Both her grandfathers were familiar with music. She used to attend her grandfathers' musical gatherings to listen to the songs of Münir Nurettin Selçuk, where she took notes. In 1934, she visited composer Bedriye Hoşgör through a family friend, where she met composer Lemi Atlı (1869–1945) and the composer and classical kemençe virtuoso Kemal Niyazi Seyhun (1885–1960). She was accepted as a student after a singing examination there. She took music lessons particularly from Atlı and Seyhun, as well as from other master musicians like Refik Fersan (1895–1963) and Fahire Fersan.

Özdenses married Faruk Ergökmen, a captain in the Turkish Army, in 1939. She regarded herself as the adoptive daughter of Lemi Atlı after he sent her a letter in 1944 signed, "Your father".

== Career ==
In 1938, Özdenses entered the state-owned Radio Ankara of Turkish Radio and Television Corporation (TRT), and performed there as a singer. After 25 years, she returned to Istanbul in 1971 and transferred to Radio Istanbul of the TRT, where she worked until retirement.

In 1939, she started to compose songs of Ottoman classical music. Her compositions Akşam Oldu Hüzünlendim Ben Yine ("Evening has come, I'm sad again"), Her Mevsim İçimden Gelir Geçersin ("You come and pass through me every season") in the melody mode of Uşşâk, and Dün Gece Mehtaba Dalıp Seni Andım ("Last night I gazed at the moonlight and thought of you") in Hüzzam became famous.

She published her first record in 1941, and made five records for Odeon Records. She never appeared on stage, except for concerts of the TRT, following her master Atlı's recommendation that "although lucrative, public appearance would ruin her career".

== Honors ==
In April 2008, then-Minister of Culture and Tourism Ertuğrul Günay bestowed upon her the "Culture and Arts Service Award".

== Later years, death, and aftermath ==
Özdenses spent the last three years of her life in a private nursing home. She transferred the royalties from performing rights to her music to the "Mehmetçik Foundation", a non-profit organization benefiting the Turkish Armed Forces.

She died at the age of 94 on 3 July 2008 in the State Hospital of Kartal, where she had been treated for lung cancer. She was interred at Şıhlı Cemetery in Kurtköy, Pendik, following a religious funeral service held at Merkez Mosque in Maltepe.

In 2015, poet and singer Onur Akay, whose poems she had set to music and whom she had regarded as her adoptive son, visited the cemetery for commemoration but could not find her grave because it had no gravestone. He insisted that the Mehmetçik Foundation address the situation and erected her gravestone within a short time.

== Legacy ==
The former Boybey Street in Üsküdar, where Özdenses' birth house was located, was renamed Semahat Özdenses Street. The municipality of Kadıköy named the Cultural Center in her honor. A street in the Cami neighborhood of the Tuzla district in Istanbul Province, where she spent her last years, is also named after her.
