= Osman Bey =

Osman Bey may refer to:

- Osman I, Ottoman Bey (c. 1254–1323)
- Tanburi Büyük Osman Bey (1816–1885), Ottoman composer
- Osman Hamdi Bey (1842–1910), Ottoman statesman
- Qara Osman (fl. 1378–1435), Oghuz Turkic leader
- Topal Osman (1883–1923), Turkish militia leader
- Osman Bey (fl. 1737), Ottoman Bosnian commander
- Osman Adil Bey, mayor of Thessaloniki (1908)
- Osman Bey, name taken by English writer and army officer Frederick van Millingen while in Ottoman service
- Osman Bey (fictional character), the main protagonist of the Turkish series Kuruluş: Osman
