= Tanburi Büyük Osman Bey =

Background information
- Born: 1816; Istanbul, Ottoman Empire
- Died: 1885 (aged 69) Istanbul, Ottoman Empire
- Genres: Ottoman classical music
- Occupations: composer, tanburi
- Instrument: tanbur

Tanburi Büyük Osman Bey or Tamburi Büyük Osman Bey (1816–1885) was an Ottoman composer and Turkish tambur player. He is considered one of the most outstanding peşrev compositors in Ottoman classical music.

== Life ==
Tanburi Büyük Osman Bey was born in 1816 in the Tophane district of Istanbul. Most of the information we have on him originates from an oral tradition amongst his pupils and the pupils of those who knew him. His father, Zeki Mehmed Ağa as well as his grandfather Tanburi Numan Ağa were musicians of renown. At the age of eight, he was accepted to the Imperial School of Enderun, where he began his education among the foregoing masters of Turkish classical music, from whom he acquired a firm theoretical basis. His acquaintance with the tanbur also dates back to those years.

As his father Zeki Mehmed Ağa is said to have refused to pass on to his son his knowledge of the tambur, most of the work must have come to be incumbent on Osman Bey himself. He is also said to have participated in fasıls with prominent vocal musicians of his time such as Rifat Bey and Haşim Bey, improving mostly his vocal technique. With the death of his father, he gave up singing and concentrated solely on his instrument and took part in "incesaz fasılları" performed at the court of Sultan Abdulaziz Han. He is said to have made most of his compositions at this period. As he was enthusiastic about Mevlana Djelaleddin Rumi, he frequented many mevlevihanes, especially the Kulekapısı Mevlevihanesi on Fridays.

He is also said to have had an obsessive temperament, known for attempting to beat a kanuni who played a false note while playing the transition to the final part of his uşşak peşrevi.

In 1885, he succumbed to a pulmonary disorder from which he had been suffering for a long time, and was buried in the cemetery of the Yahya Efendi Dergâhı in Istanbul. He had three sons and a daughter.

== Compositions ==
As a composer, he excelled mostly in peşrevs which make up an important part of the Ottoman classical repertoire. His style displays a certain minimalism, avoiding rapid changes from one uslub to the other, thus lightening the peşrev form and conferring it with a balanced structure. Most of his peşrevs use devr-i kebir as a rhythmic basis and are easily distinguishable from the earlier works of his precedents. The only former peşrev composer he is said to have cherished is Gazi Giray Han, whose "Hüzzam Peşrevi" he designated the as "sehl-i mümtenî", ("a simple work done with great skill", “piece of a jewel"). After having refused for a long time to compose a peşrev in the same maqam (hüzzam) for the musical rites of the Mevlevi order, he finally composed his own famous hüzzam peşrevi on the instigation of the sheikh of the Galata Mevlevi Monastery Atâullah Efendi. This piece is still widely heard during Mevlevi rites.

Following is a list of extant compositions:

Name	Maqam	Form	Usul
Bilmem nedir ey gülizar	Acembuselik	Şarkı (vocal)	Aksak (9/8)
Aşkın ile ey nevcivan	Acemkürdi	Şarkı (vocal)	Düyek (8/8)
Gönül meyleyledi bir mehcemale	Bayatiaraban	Şarkı (vocal)	Ağır aksak (9/4)
Getir saki badeyi mayei candır	Hicazkâr	Şarkı (vocal)	Düyek (8/8)
Gül yüzünü seyredip can ile sevdim seni	Hicazkâr	Şarkı (vocal)	Curcuna (10/16)
Şahenşehi şevketmeab	Hisarbuselik	Şarkı (vocal)	Aksak (9/8)
Aşıkına peyvestesin	Hüzzam	Şarkı (vocal)	Aksak (9/8)
Derunumda var türlü hicran	Mahur	Şarkı (vocal)	Aksak (9/8)
Firkatin kâr etti cana nevcivan	Mahur	Şarkı (vocal)	Aksak (9/8)
Gördüğüm anda seni ey nevcivan	Nihavend	Şarkı (vocal)	Düyek (8/8)
Vadinde ey şuhı melek	Nihavend	Şarkı (vocal)	Aksak (9/8)
Bin can ile sevdim seni,	Nişaburek	Şarkı (vocal)	Aksak (9/8)
Goncai nevhıyzveş açılmak istersek eğer	Nühüft	Şarkı (vocal)	Aksak (9/8)
Dil sevdi sen şuhşeni	Revnaknüma	Şarkı (vocal)	Ağır Düyek (8/4)
Ey dilberi işvenüma	Tarzınevin	Şarkı (vocal)	Düyek (8/8)
Buselik Peşrev	Buselik	Peşrev (instrumental)	Muhammes (32/4)
Ferahfeza Saz Semaisi, ,	Ferahfeza	Saz Semai (instrumental)	Aksak Semai (10/8)
Hicaz Peşrev	Hicaz	Peşrev	Devrikebir (28/4)
Hicazkâr Saz Semaisi	Hicazkâr	Saz Semai	Aksak Semai (10/8)
Hicazkâr Peşrev, , ,	Hicazkâr	Peşrev	Devrikebir (28/4)
Hisarbuselik Saz Semaisi, ,	Hisarbuselik	Saz Semai	Aksak Semai (10/8)
Hüzzam Saz Semaisi	Hüzzam	Saz Semai	Aksak Semai (10/8)
Hüzzam Peşrev	Hüzzam	Peşrev	Devrikebir (28/4)
Mahur Peşrev	Mahur	Peşrev	Muhammes (32/4)
Mahurbuselik Peşrev	Mahurbuselik	Peşrev	Hafif (32/2)
Maye Saz Semaisi	Maye	Saz Semai	Aksak Semai (10/8)
Maye Peşrev	Maye	Peşrev	Devrikebir (28/4)
Nihavend Peşrev, , ,	Nihavend	Peşrev	Devrikebir (28/4)
Nişaburek Peşrev	Nişaburek	Peşrev	Hafif (32/2)
Nühüft Saz Semaisi	Nühüft	Saz Semai	Aksak Semai (10/8)
Nühüft Peşrev, , ,	Nühüft	Peşrev	Devrikebir (28/4)
Rast Saz Semaisi	Rast	Saz Semai	Aksak Semai (10/8)
Revnaknüma Saz Semaisi	Revnaknüma	Saz Semai	Aksak Semai (10/8)
Revnaknüma Peşrev	Revnaknüma	Peşrev	Hafif (32/2)
Saba Saz Semaisi, ,	Saba	Saz Semai	Aksak Semai (10/8)
Saba Peşrev, , ,	Saba	Peşrev	Devrikebir (28/4)
Sabazemzeme Peşrev	Sabazemzeme	Peşrev	Muhammes (32/4)
Segâh Peşrev	Segâh	Peşrev	Devrikebir (28/4)
Suzidil Saz Semaisi	Suzidil	Saz Semai	Aksak Semai (10/8)
Şeddiaraban Peşrev	Şeddiaraban	Peşrev	Hafif (32/2)
Tarzınevin Saz Semaisi	Tarzınevin	Saz Semai	Aksak Semai (10/8)
Tarzınevin Peşrev	Tarzınevin	Peşrev	Muhammes (32/4)
Uşşak Peşrev, ,	Uşşak	Peşrev	Hafif (32/2)
Yegâh Peşrev, ,	Yegâh	Peşrev	Muhammes (32/4)
