= Medhal =

Turkish musical form

Medhal is an instrumental form in Turkish makam music or Ottoman classical music. The first piece in Medhal form was composed by Ali Rıfat Çağatay. Most of the Medhal compositions are in short usuls like Sofyan. Two basic forms are used: i) A+B+C+B+D+B+E+B , ii) A+B+C+B, where B refers to the section "Mulazime". This form is similar to Peşrev but is often more free than Peşrev. It is not an old form, but is mainly used in the 20th century.

== Compositions in for Medhal (Turkish makam music) ==
Below is a list of some compositions in for Medhal.

- Rast Medhal (Alâeddin Yavaşça)
- Rast Medhal (Ali Rıfat Çağatay)
- Rast Medhal (Sadun Aksüt)
