= Bekir =

Name list

Bekir is a Turkish given name for males which comes from Abu Bakr, the first Caliph of Islam.

== Given name ==
- Bekir Fikri (1882–1914), Ottoman officer and revolutionary
- Bekir Sıtkı Bircan (1886–1967), Turkish footballer
- Bekir Bozdağ (born 1965), Turkish lawyer and politician
- Bekir Büyükarkın (1921–1998), Turkish poet, novelist and playwright
- Bekir Çoban-zade (1893–1937), Crimean Tatar poet and professor of Turkic languages
- Bekir Coşkun (1945–2020), Turkish journalist
- Bekir Sıtkı Erdoğan (1926–2014), Turkish poet and songwriter
- Bekir Sami Günsav (1879–1934), officer of the Ottoman Army
- Bekir İrtegün (born 1984), Turkish footballer
- Bekir Karayel (born 1982), Turkish middle and long-distance runner
- Bekir Sami Kunduh (1867–1933), Turkish politician
- Bekir Küçükay (born 1958), Turkish classical guitarist
- Bekir Ozan Has (born 1985), Turkish footballer
- Bekir Sami Kunduh (1867–1933), Turkish foreign minister
- Bakr Sidqi (1890–1937), Iraqi nationalist and general of Kurdish origin
- Bekir Özlü (born 1988), Georgian-Turkish judoka
- Bekir Rasim (born 1994), Bulgarian footballer of Turkish descent
- Bekir Refet (1899–1977), Turkish football player
- Bekir Sıtkı Sezgin (1936–1996), Turkish musician
- Bekir Yarangüme (born 1977), Turkish basketball player
- Muhamed Bekir Kalajdžić (1892–1963), Bosnian writer, bookseller and publisher

== Surname ==
- Erol Bekir (born 1974), Swedish-Macedonian football manager and former player of Turkish origin
