= Yine Bir Gülnihâl =

Ottoman waltz by Hammamizade İsmail Dede Efendi

Yine Bir Gülnihâl ("Again a Rose Bush") is a classical piece within Ottoman classical music. It is a waltz song (meaning it uses the sema'i style, equivalent to the 3/4 waltz rhythm), and uses the râst makam. It was composed by Hammâmîzâde İsmâil Dede Efendi in the 19th century. He composed the song for Gülnihâl Hanım, as a token of his love for her. The composition of this song has occurred within a period of westernisation in the Ottoman empire, which influenced composers of Ottoman music. Violinist Cihat Aşkın has identified the song as "the first instance of a waltz [song] in Turkish music".

The song has been sung by many artists, including Zeki Müren, Barış Manço and Nesrin Sipahi.

== Lyrics ==
Ottoman Turkish

ینه بر گل‌نهال آلدی بو گوڭلمی
سیم تن غنجه فم بی‌بدل اول گوزل
آتشین رخلری یاقدی بو گوڭلمی
پر‌اداء پر‌جفاء پك گوچوك پك گوزل
گورمدیم كیمسه‌ده بویله بر دل‌روبا
بویله قاش بویله گوز بویله أل بویله یوز
عاشقڭ باغرینی اوزمه‌یه گوز سوزر
الامان پك يامان هر زمان اول گوزل

Transliteration

Yine bir gül-nihâl aldı bu gönlümü
Sîm-ten gonca-fem bî-bedel ol güzel
Âteşîn ruhleri yaktı bu gönlümü
Pür-edâ' pür-cefâ' pek küçük pek güzel
Görmedim kimsede böyle bir dil-rûbâ
Böyle kaş böyle göz böyle el böyle yüz
Âşıkın bağrını üzmeye göz süzer
El-âmân pek yaman her zamân ol güzel

English

Once again, a rose-bush-like beauty has taken my heart
Silver-skinned, rosebud-lipped, unmatched is that beauty
Fiery souls have burned this heart of mine
Full of charm, full of torment, so young, so lovely
I have not seen such a captivating one in anyone
Such brows, such eyes, such hands, such a face
She glances to wound the lover's heart
Oh mercy, always relentless, always that beauty
