= Bîmen Şen =

Turkish composer and lyricist of Armenian descent (1873–1943)

- Born: Bîmen Dergazaryan; 1873; Bursa, Ottoman Empire
- Died: 26 August 1943 (aged 69–70) Istanbul, Turkey
- Genres: Ottoman classical music, Turkish makam music
- Occupations: composer, lyrics author

Bîmen Şen (born Bîmen Dergazaryan, Armenian: Բիմէն Տէրկազարեանn; 1873 – 26 August 1943) was a composer and lyricist of Armenian descent.

== Life ==
Şen was born in 1873 in Bursa, Ottoman Empire. He came from a music-loving family and was esteemed for his singing. As a child, Şen performed hymns in the Armenian church and quickly became well known. At age eleven, while visiting Bursa, he was introduced to Hacı Arif Bey. As an adult, Şen moved to Istanbul, and was able to improve his financial situation and establish connections with people in various circles. He studied with some of the most influential musical figures of the day, including Hacı Arif Bey, Cemil Bey, Neyzen Aziz Dede, Şevki Dede, Rahmi Bey, Hanende Nedim Bey, and Hacı Kirami Efendi. Şen eventually became a celebrated singer.

He died in Istanbul on 26 August 1943.

== See also ==
- List of composers of classical Turkish music
