= Ad libitum =

Latin expression for "at one's pleasure"

In music and other performing arts, the phrase ad libitum (/æd ˈlɪbɪtəm/; Latin for 'at one's pleasure' or 'as you desire'), often shortened to "ad lib" (as an adjective or adverb) or "ad-lib" (as a verb or noun), refers to various forms of improvisation.

The roughly synonymous phrase a bene placito ('in accordance with [one's] good pleasure') is less common but, in its Italian form a piacere, has entered the musical lingua franca (see below).

The phrase "at liberty" is often associated mnemonically (because of the alliteration of the lib- syllable), although it is not the translation (there is no cognation between libitum and liber). Libido is the etymologically closer cognate known in English.

In biology and nutrition, the phrase is used to describe feeding without restriction.

== Music ==
As a direction in sheet music, ad libitum indicates that the performer or conductor has one of a variety of types of discretion with respect to a given passage:

- to play the passage in free time rather than in strict or "metronomic" tempo (a practice known as rubato when not expressly indicated by the composer);
- to improvise a melodic line fitting the general structure prescribed by the passage's written notes or chords;
- to omit an instrument part, such as a nonessential accompaniment, for the duration of the passage; or
- in the phrase "repeat ad libitum", to play the passage a non-arbitrary number of times (cf. vamp).

The direction a piacere (see above) has a more restricted meaning, generally referring to only the first two types of discretion. Baroque music, especially, has a written or implied ad libitum, with most composers intimating the freedom the performer and conductor have.

For post-Baroque classical music and jazz, see cadenza.

In hip-hop, ad-libs are commonly used to accent certain words in a bar. One of the most famous examples of American record producer DJ Khaled, who is known to shout phrases such as "We the best music!" or "Another one!" in his songs. The ad-libs of a producer can also act as producer tags for the producers themselves, which is again seen in DJ Khaled's records. It should be noted, however, that the role of ad-libs is not limited to the producer, and rappers using their own ad-libs is just as if not more prevalent.

== Other performing arts ==
"Ad-lib" is used to describe individual moments during live theatre when an actor speaks through their character using words not found in the play's text. When the entire performance is predicated on spontaneous creation, the process is called improvisational theatre.

In film, the term ad-lib usually refers to the interpolation of unscripted material in an otherwise scripted performance. For example, in interviews, Dustin Hoffman says he ad-libbed the now famous line, "I'm walking here! I'm walking here!" as "Ratso" Rizzo in Midnight Cowboy (1969). While filming at a streetcorner, the scene was interrupted by a taxi driver. Hoffman wanted to say, "We're filming a movie here!", but stayed in character, allowing the take to be used.

Some actors are also known for their ability or tendency to ad-lib, such as Peter Falk of the television series Columbo. When performing as Columbo, Falk would ad-lib such mannerisms as absent-mindedness, fumbling through his pockets, or asking for a pencil, all in a deliberate attempt to frustrate his co-stars in the scene and obtain a more genuine reaction.

Live performers such as television talk-show hosts sometimes deliver material that sounds ad-libbed but is actually scripted. They may employ ad-lib writers to prepare such material. The HBO sitcom Curb Your Enthusiasm by Seinfeld co-creator Larry David primarily uses retroscripting and ad-lib instead of scripted dialogue.

== See also ==
- List of Latin phrases
- Ad infinitum
- Ad nauseam
- Improvisation
- Mad Libs
- Parrhesia
