= List of Altair: A Record of Battles chapters =

Altair: A Record of Battles is a Japanese manga series written and illustrated by Kotono Katō about Tuğril Mahmut, a young military officer and his exploits to protect his country from invasion by a neighboring empire. It was first published in the 9th 2007 issue of the shōnen manga magazine Monthly Shōnen Sirius, published by Kodansha on July 26, 2007. Kodansha's North American subsidiary Kodansha USA announced that it will release the series in English via its digital platform, starting on March 21, 2017.

== Volumes ==
No.	Original release date	Original ISBN	English release date	English ISBN
1	April 23, 2008	978-4-06-373112-5	March 21, 2017 (digital)	978-1-68-233614-4
1 Fasıl: "The Golden Eagle General" (犬鷲の将軍); 2 Fasıl: "The Poison General" (毒薬の将軍); 3 Fasıl: "The Hatted Viceroy" (飾り帽子の総督); 4 Fasıl: "Tragic Clansmen" (悲劇の民); 5 Fasıl: "The Citadel" (砦の町)
2	August 22, 2008	978-4-06-373130-9	August 8, 2017 (digital)	978-1-68-233688-5
6 Fasıl: "The Council of Generals" (将軍会議); 7 Fasıl: "The Oasis Town" (オアシスの町); 8 Fasıl: "Slumdog Bandit" (貧民街の盗賊); 9 Fasıl: "The Eagle's Homeland" (犬鷲の故郷); 10 Fasıl: "The Eyes and Ears Director" (目と耳の長官); 11 Fasıl: "The Eagle's Joint Struggle" (犬鷲の共闘)
3	December 22, 2008	978-4-06-373148-4	August 29, 2017 (digital)	978-1-68-233690-8
12 Fasıl: "The Lighthouse City" (燈台の都); 13 Fasıl: "The Lizard of the Back Alley" (裏路地の蜥蜴); 14 Fasıl: "Steel Chains" (黒鉄の鎖); 15 Fasıl: "The Snowy Wolf" (銀嶺の狼); 16 Fasıl: "The Fall of the Ancient City" (古都陥落)
4	March 23, 2009	978-4-06-373167-5	September 26, 2017 (digital)	978-1-68-233731-8
17 Fasıl: "The City of the Sea" (海の都); 18 Fasıl: "The Wasp of the Surf" (波頭の狩人蜂); 19 Fasıl: "Masque of Sincerity" (至誠の仮面劇); Başka Hikâye (Another Story): "Anastasia's Captain of the Guard" (アナスタシアの親衛隊長)
5	August 21, 2009	978-4-06-373185-9	October 24, 2017 (digital)	978-1-68-233732-5
20 Fasıl: "The Great Assembly" (大将国会議); 21 Fasıl: "The Sultanlu of Spears" (槍の将国); 22 Fasıl: "The Red Tiger Sultan" (紅虎の将王); 23 Fasıl: "The Crimson Palace" (紅の宮殿); 24 Fasıl: "Dance of the Moonlit Beauty" (月下佳人の舞)
6	February 22, 2010	978-4-06-376210-5	December 5, 2017 (digital)	978-1-64-212011-0
25 Fasıl: "The Sultanlu of Daggers" (短刀の将国); 26 Fasıl: "The Sultanlu of Swords" (剣の将国); 27 Fasıl: "The 45th Heir" (四十五番目の将子); 28 Fasıl: "The Floodgate General" (水門の将軍); 29 Fasıl: "The Pear Princess" (洋梨の将姫); 30 Fasıl: "The Crown Prince of Swords" (剣の将太子)
7	September 9, 2010	978-4-06-376234-1	February 6, 2018 (digital)	978-1-64-212091-2
31 Fasıl: "The Sultanluk Civil War" (将国内乱); 32 Fasıl: "The Battle of Acayup" (奇岩会戦); 33 Fasıl: "The Wretched Tiger King" (虎王無惨); 34 Fasıl: "Familial Cruelty" (親子無情); 35 Fasıl: "The Civil War's Conclusion" (内乱終結)
8	January 7, 2011	978-4-06-376248-8	May 15, 2018 (digital)	978-1-64-212233-6
36 Fasıl: "The Golden Eagle's Summons" (犬鷲の召喚); 37 Fasıl: "The Silver City" (銀色の都); 38 Fasıl: "The Merchant's Daughter" (隊商の娘); 39 Fasıl: "The Eastern Hermit" (東方の隠者); 40 Fasıl: "The Golden Eagle's Foresight" (犬鷲の遠謀); 41 Fasıl: "Naval Battle off the Coast of Phoiníkē" (ポイニキア沖海戦)
9	September 9, 2011	978-4-06-376272-3	January 29, 2019 (digital)	978-1-64-212628-0
42 Fasıl: "Designs & Resolve" (野心と果断); 43 Fasıl: "The Northern Kingdom" (北の王国); 44 Fasıl: "The King's Pining" (王の渇望); 45 Fasıl: "The Northern Country's Crossroads" (北国の岐路); 46 Fasıl: "Conspiracy & Departure" (謀議と門出); 47 Fasıl: "The Island City" (島の都); 48 Fasıl: "The Tripartite Diplomatic Convention" (三国同盟会議)
10	April 9, 2012	978-4-06-376326-3	April 16, 2019 (digital)	978-1-64-212813-0
49 Fasıl: "The Great War Commenses" (大戦の始まり); 50 Fasıl: "The Cliff City, The Greek City" (岩の都、小川の都); 51 Fasıl: "The Flowers City" (花の都); 52 Fasıl: "A Floral Plot" (花の一計); 53 Fasıl: "The Heart of the Continent" (大陸の心臓); 54 Fasıl: "Wishing Upon Stars" (冀う星々)
11	September 7, 2012	978-4-06-376358-4	July 16, 2019 (digital)	978-1-64-212948-9
55 Fasıl: "The Oxen Mercenaries" (牡牛の傭兵団); 56 Fasıl: "The Golden Eagle's Curriculum" (犬鷲の教程); 57 Fasıl: "Equestrian Nomad Ingenuity" (騎馬民族の技); 58 Fasıl: "The Counteroffenive Swells" (反攻の萌芽); 59 Fasıl: "The Boy of Belltown" (鐘の都の少年)
12	March 8, 2013	978-4-06-376384-3	November 26, 2019 (digital)	978-1-64-659140-4
60 Fasıl: "The Heavenly City" (天上の都); 61 Fasıl: "The Metropolis General" (大都市の将軍); 62 Fasıl: "The Cage of Paradise" (楽園の檻); 63 Fasıl: "The Beast Tamer" (獣を操る者); 64 Fasıl: "A Storm of Spears" (槍の奔流); 65 Fasıl: "Faraway Funeral Bells" (弔鐘遥かなり)
13	October 9, 2013	978-4-06-376424-6	December 24, 2019 (digital)	978-1-64-659180-0
66 Fasıl: "The Centran Front" (央海海戦); 67 Fasıl: "The Children of Neptune" (海神の子); 68 Fasıl: "The Queen & The Clown" (女王と道化師); 69 Fasıl: "Equestrian Nomad Ingenuity II" (騎馬民族の技２); 70 Fasıl: "The Anti-Imperial Alliance" (反帝の同盟)
14	April 9, 2014	978-4-06-376455-0	January 28, 2020 (digital)	978-1-64-659218-0
71 Fasıl: "Two-Fold Encirclement" (二重包囲の陣); 72 Fasıl: "The Allies Strike Back" (同盟の逆襲); 73 Fasıl: "The Golden Eagle's Pursuit" (犬鷲の追撃); 74 Fasıl: "The Battle of the City of Swords" (剣の都攻防戦); 75 Fasıl: "The Key to Heaven" (天上の鍵); 76 Fasıl: "Paradise Lost" (楽園の終焉)
15	December 9, 2014	978-4-06-376512-0	February 25, 2020 (digital)	978-1-64-659246-3
77 Fasıl: "Governor of the Province" (属州の総督); 78 Fasıl: "The Empire's Prime Minister" (帝国の宰相); 79 Fasıl: "The Mayor's Son" (市長の息子); 80 Fasıl: "The Royal Descendants" (王家の末裔); 81 Fasıl: "Poison and Medicine" (毒と薬)
16	July 9, 2015	978-4-06-376553-3	March 24, 2020 (digital)	978-1-64-659267-8
82 Fasıl: "Saddletop Song" (鞍上歌); 83 Fasıl: "Equestrian Nomad Ingenuity III" (騎馬民族の技３); 84 Fasıl: "The Mounted Highway Ambush Route" (騎襲回廊); 85 Fasıl: "Shield and Hornet" (盾と蜂); 86 Fasıl: "Religione" (信仰の町); 87 Fasıl: "At the End of the Wild Rush" (疾走の果て)
17	March 9, 2016	978-4-06-376599-1	April 28, 2020 (digital)	978-1-64-659346-0
88 Fasıl: "La Forêt de la Religion" (信仰の森); 89 Fasıl: "The Winter Festival" (越年祭); 90 Fasıl: "Muhl" (城壁の町); 91 Fasıl: "A Turning Point" (転回点); 92 Fasıl: "Warning Bells" (警告の鐘); 93 Fasıl: "The Duchess' Marriage" (公爵の結婚)
18	January 17, 2017	978-4-06-390673-8	May 26, 2020 (digital)	978-1-64-659371-2
94 Fasıl: "Gravestone for the Ancient Empire" (古代帝国の墓標); 95 Fasıl: "Descendant of Warriors" (戦士の末裔); 96 Fasıl: "The Hermann's Blitz" (新貴族の突撃); 97 Fasıl: "Traps upon Traps" (罠と罠); Kısa Hikâye (Short Story): "The Tiger-Lord of the Land of Spears" (槍の将国の虎王)
19	June 23, 2017	978-4-06-390715-5	June 23, 2020 (digital)	978-1-64-659397-2
98 Fasıl: "Behind the Trap" (罠の裏); 99 Fasıl: "Behind the Behind" (裏の裏); 100 Fasıl: "The Imperial Invasion" (帝国の侵攻); 101 Fasıl: "The Burning Homeland" (燃ゆる祖国); Kısa Hikâye (Short Story): "Niki and Marg's Finest Cuisine" (ニキ×マル極上めし)
20	December 8, 2017	978-4-06-510331-9	July 28, 2020 (digital)	978-1-64-659605-8
102 Fasıl: "The Sultans Rise" (将王起つ); 103 Fasıl: "Invaders' Rest" (侵略者の休息); 104 Fasıl: "The Architect General" (建築家の将軍); 105 Fasıl: "Cheshme, Town of Springs" (泉の町); 106 Fasıl: "The Weapon-Seller General" (武器商の将王); Kısa Hikâye (Short Story): "The Golden Eagle Boy" (犬鷲の少年)
21	September 7, 2018	978-4-06-512584-7	August 25, 2020 (digital)	978-1-64-659654-6
107 Fasıl: "Battle at Çeşme Dere" (泉の谷攻防戦); 108 Fasıl: "The City of Fountains Falls" (泉の町陥落); 109 Fasıl: "The Holy Scholar King" (聖官の将王); 110 Fasıl: "The Imperial Princess Arrives" (皇女の到着); 111 Fasıl: "The Golden Eagle Returns" (犬鷲の帰還); 112 Fasıl: "Battle for the Golden City" (金色の町攻防戦); Kısa Hikâye (Short Story): "The General's Hat" (犬軍の帽子)
22	September 9, 2019	978-4-06-516453-2	September 22, 2020 (digital)	978-1-64-659706-2
113 Fasıl: The Old Wall (古門城壁, Furukado jōheki); 114 Fasıl: Imperial Sword (帝国の剣, Teikoku no Ken); 115 Fasıl: The Order (号令, Gōrei); 116 Fasıl: The Star of Hope (希望の星, Kibō no Hoshi); 117 Fasıl: Storming the Citadel (城砦突入, Jōtoride totsunyū); 118 Fasıl: Camels and Horseshoes (駱駝と蹄鉄, Rakuda to Teitetsu); 119 Fasıl: St. Michael's Gate (聖ミヒャエル門, Hijiri mihyaeru mon); 120 Fasıl: The Star of Despair (絶望の星, Zetsubō no Hoshi)
23	August 6, 2020	978-4-06-520401-6	December 1, 2020 (digital)	978-1-64-659854-0
121 Fasıl: The Avenger; 122 Fasıl: The Master of St. Michael Castle; 123 Fasıl: Hunter of the City of Gold; 124 Fasıl: Ambush; 125 Fasıl: The King's Confidant; 126 Fasıl: Swords and Daggers; 127 Fasıl: The King's Right Hand; 128 Fasıl: The Baton of Command
24	June 9, 2021	978-4-06-523402-0	October 12, 2021 (digital)	978-1-63-699413-0
129 Fasıl: At Imperatorlu-Kapu; 130 Fasıl: A Message to St. Michael; 131 Fasıl: Checkmate; 132 Fasıl: To the End; 133 Fasıl: The Beacon; 134 Fasıl: The Crimson Meteor Shower
25	March 9, 2022	978-4-06-527088-2	September 27, 2022 (digital)	978-1-68-491462-3
135 Fasıl: The Conquerors; 136 Fasıl: The Dedication; 137 Fasıl: The General's Nation; 138 Fasıl: Nobless Oblige; 139 Fasıl: The Marquis' Son; 140 Fasıl: The Road Network; 141 Fasıl: The Engagement
26	March 8, 2024	978-4-06-534889-5	September 10, 2024 (digital)	979-8-89-478009-2
27	April 9, 2024	978-4-06-534887-1	December 31, 2024 (digital)	979-8-89-478297-3

== Shōkoku no Altair-san ==
Monthly Shōnen Sirius also serialized Shiina Soga's Altair of the Tiny Nation (小国のアルタイルさん, Shōkoku no Altair-san), a short, comedic chibi-styled manga from 2012 to 2013, with a total of 21 chapters and released in a single tankōbon volume. On August 26, 2017, a special chapter of Shōkoku no Altair-san was released in the October 2017 issue of the Monthly Shōnen Sirius magazine.

No.	Release date	ISBN
01	October 9, 2013	978-4-06-376426-0
Chapter 1: "Mahmut and the New Continent"; Chapter 2: "Mahmut and the Power of Empire"; Chapter 3: "Mahmut and Poison Pasha Hotpot"; Chapter 4: "Mahmut and his Eagle Companion"; Chapter 5: "Mahmut and Phoiníkē (Revised)"; Chapter 6: "Lelederik and the Taming of Empire"; Chapter 7: "Mahmut Collapses"; Chapter 8: "Mahmut and Venedik, City of Beauty"; Chapter 9: "Mahmut and Poems of the New Continent"; Chapter 10: "Mahmut and the Heroes of the New Continent"; Chapter 11: "Balaban and the Power of Four"; Chapter 12: "Mahmut and the Mystery of Iskender"; Chapter 13: "Mahmut and Fashions of the New Continent"; Chapter 14: "Lelederik and the Cute Dolls"; Chapter 15: "Mahmut and a True Love Story"; Chapter 16: "Mahmut and Opening the Closed Country"; Chapter 17: "Mahmut and Opening the Closed Country 2"; Chapter 18: "Mahmut and Türkiye Love"; Chapter 19: "Konstantinos and Phoiníkē's Revival"; Chapter 20: "Zağanos and the Art of Shadowing"; Chapter 21: "Mahmut and New World"; Extra: "The Little Necromancer"

== Shōkoku no Altair Kaiden Tōkoku no Subaru ==
Another spin-off, titled Subaru of the Island Nation (将国のアルタイル嵬伝, Shōkoku no Arutairu Gaiden Tōkoku no Subaru), written by Hirokazu Kobayashi and illustrated by Kotono Kato's sister, Chika Katō's, was serialized in Monthly Shōnen Sirius from January 26, 2016, to April 26, 2019. The set far to the east of Rumeliana, where the more Asian-influence countries exist and takes roughly six months ahead of the main series. The plot focus on the island nation of Kusanagi, which has been annexed by the larger country of Çinili and fallen into ruin. Subaru masquerades as the nation's former prince and tries to leads a rebellion to free her country. Kodansha collected its chapters in seven tankōbon volumes, released from January 17, 2017, to September 9, 2019.

No.	Release date	ISBN
1	January 17, 2017	978-4-06-390676-9
Chapter 1: "A Star Falls on the Ruined Country"; Chapter 2: "The Prince Dances: Gunfire Echoing in the City"; Chapter 3: "The Prince Pulls the Plug: Sacrifice to the Mountain God"
2	June 23, 2017	978-4-06-390716-2
3	December 8, 2017	978-4-06-510314-2
4	March 9, 2018	978-4-06-511048-5
5	July 9, 2018	978-4-06-511947-1
6	February 8, 2019	978-4-06-514508-1
7	September 9, 2019	978-4-06-516477-8
