= Beqiri =

Other names
- Variant forms: Beqir; Bekir

Beqiri is an Albanian surname. Notable people with the surname include:

- Alban Beqiri (born 1994), Albanian boxer
- Ardit Beqiri (born 1979), Albanian footballer
- Argjend Beqiri (born 1974), Macedonian footballer
- Elvin Beqiri (born 1980), Albanian footballer
- Ermal Beqiri, Albanian technology entrepreneur, IT expert and owner of Soft & Solution Group
- Fahri Beqiri (1936–2021), Albanian composer
- Jeton Beqiri (born 1982), Macedonian football coach and former footballer
- Orjand Beqiri (born 1985), Albanian footballer
- Rexheb Beqiri (1901–1995), Albanian Muslim scholar and Sufi
- Rrahim Beqiri (1957–2001), Kosovan military officer
- Shemsi Beqiri (born 1986), Albanian-Swiss kickboxer
