= Teslim =

A teslīm (Arabic: تسليم; also spelled taslim or tasleem) is a refrain in classical Arabic music and Ottoman classical music. It returns several times in the genres of sama'i, peşrev, and saz semaisi. This term is the equivalent to the Ottoman term mülâzeme.
