= Yazgan (surname) =

Yazgan is a surname. Notable people with the surname include:

- Bestâmi Yazgan (born 1957), Turkish composer
- Ercan Yazgan (born 1946), Turkish comedian and political satirist
- Mehmet Emin Yazgan (1876–1961), Ottoman Army officer
- Orkun Yazgan (born 1970), Turkish TV presenter and musician
