= Ahmet Uzel =

Turkish composer

- Born: 1930; Bursa, Turkey
- Died: 5 October 1998 (aged 67–68)
- Genre: Ottoman classical music Turkish makam music
- Occupation: Composer

Ahmet Cafer Uzel (1930 – 5 October 1998) was a Turkish composer. Uzel launched his career in 1948 and penned his first poem and composed music for the first time the same year. Even though he did not receive any formal education in music or literature, he has composed more than 5000 pieces all featuring his own lyrics. Uzel published his work for the first time on January 20, 1994; until then only a few close friends had seen it. The Turkish Radio and Television Corporation repertory includes 300 compositions by Uzel.

== See also ==
- List of composers of classical Turkish music
