= Peşrev =

Instrumental form in Ottoman music

Peşrev or Peshrev (Turkish, "prelude"; pronounced [peʃˈɾev]) is an instrumental form in Ottoman music. It is the name of the first piece of music played during a group performance called a fasıl (Turkish pronunciation: [faˈsɯɫ]). It also serves as the penultimate piece of the Mevlevi ayini, a ritual music of the Mevlevi Order, under the name son peşrev (final peşrev), preceding son semai. It usually uses long rhythm cycles, stretching over many measures as opposed to the simpler usul the other major form of instrumental music uses, saz semai.

Along with the saz semai, called in Arabic the sama'i, it was introduced into Arabic music in the 19th century and became particularly popular in Egypt.

== Etymology ==
In Ottoman Turkish, peşrev combines a New Persian loanword, piš "before, ahead" and the native term rev, "that which goes". coming to mean "that which comes first".

== Structure ==
Peşrevs are composed of movements called hane /haːˈne/ (lit. "house"), at the end of which there is always an unchanging particle introducing the teslim /tesˈliːm/ (lit. "handing in") a.k.a. mülazime /mylaːziˈme/ (lit. "that which is inseparable or constant"), i.e. the refrain. Peşrevs are named after the Turkish makam used in the first hane and usually end with this makam; in Turkish classical music theory, they are said to be "bound" to this makam. There are always modulations to other makams in the hanes that follow the first hane, but with the refrain (teslim), the piece always regains the principal mode. At the end of each hane, a pause is made on the strong degree of its makam, forming a semi-cadence. This is called a yarım karar or nim karar (lit. "semi-decision"). Peşrevs usually have 4 hanes, yet they occasionally have 2, 5 or 6.

In principle, they comport rather large usuls, yet peşrevs with shorter rhythmical patterns do exist. One rule that is never transgressed is that this usul may not be a compound meter of the family aksak. Some peşrevs, called batak or karabatak, are organized as to instigate a form of question-and-answer between instruments.

If the hanes are to be marked with [A, C, D, E] and the teslim with [B], the regular structure of a peşrev would be A+B/C+B/D+B/E+B, thus always ending with the teslim. For some, the teslim is also the first hane; therefore they have the structure: A/B+A/C+A/D+A.

== Peşrev composers in Ottoman classical music ==
Tanburi Büyük Osman Bey was a prominent peşrev composer. Other composers include Tamburi Cemil Bey, Gazi Giray Han, Dimitrie Cantemir and Dilhayat Kalfa.
