= Bolâhenk Nuri Bey =

- Born: 1834; Istanbul, Turkey
- Died: 1910 (aged 75–76) Istanbul, Turkey
- Genres: Ottoman classical music, Turkish makam music
- Occupation: composer

Bolâhenk Nuri Bey (1834–1910) was a Turkish Ottoman composer. Nuri Bey's compositions serve as grand examples of the classical styles.

He was noted as one of the famous music masters of his time.

In 1873, he gathered and published a collection of folk songs.

== See also ==
- List of composers of classical Turkish music
