= Hammamizade İsmail Dede Efendi =

Ottoman classical composer

Hammamizade İsmail Dede Efendi (9 January 1778 – 29 November 1846) was a composer of Ottoman classical music.

== Biography ==
He was born on 9 January 1778, at Şehzadebaşı-Fatih in Istanbul, and started studying music with Mehmed Emin Efendi, at the age of eight. He attended rituals and learned to play the ney at the Yenikapı Mevlevihanesi, a place of Mevlevi dervish gatherings. He studied with Ali Nutki Dede and became a "Dede" himself in 1799. Dede Efendi's music was appreciated by Sultan Selim III and he performed his works at the palace. He composed hundreds of songs and mevlevi rituals. In 1846 he made the pilgrimage to Mecca but contracted cholera in Mina and died. His grave is now in Mecca.

== His music ==
Dede Efendi gave lessons in Turkish music to Hamparsum Limonciyan who developed the Hamparsum notation, the dominant notation for Turkish music.

One of the greatest Turkish composers, he created masterpieces in all forms and modes of Turkish music. He also developed the composite musical modes of "sultanî yegâh", "nev-eser", "saba-buselik", "hicaz-buselik" and "araban kürdî". His greatest works are the seven Mevlevi pieces for Samah. More than two hundred of his compositions are available today.

His piece, Ey büt-i nev edâ olmuşum müptelâ, is featured as part of the theme for the Ottoman civilisation in the expansion for the strategy game, Sid Meier's Civilization VI: Gathering Storm.

He composed the first Turkish Waltz song, Yine Bir Gülnihâl.

== Museum ==
His house and music salon in the Istanbul neighbourhood of Cankurtaran has been preserved and is now a museum.

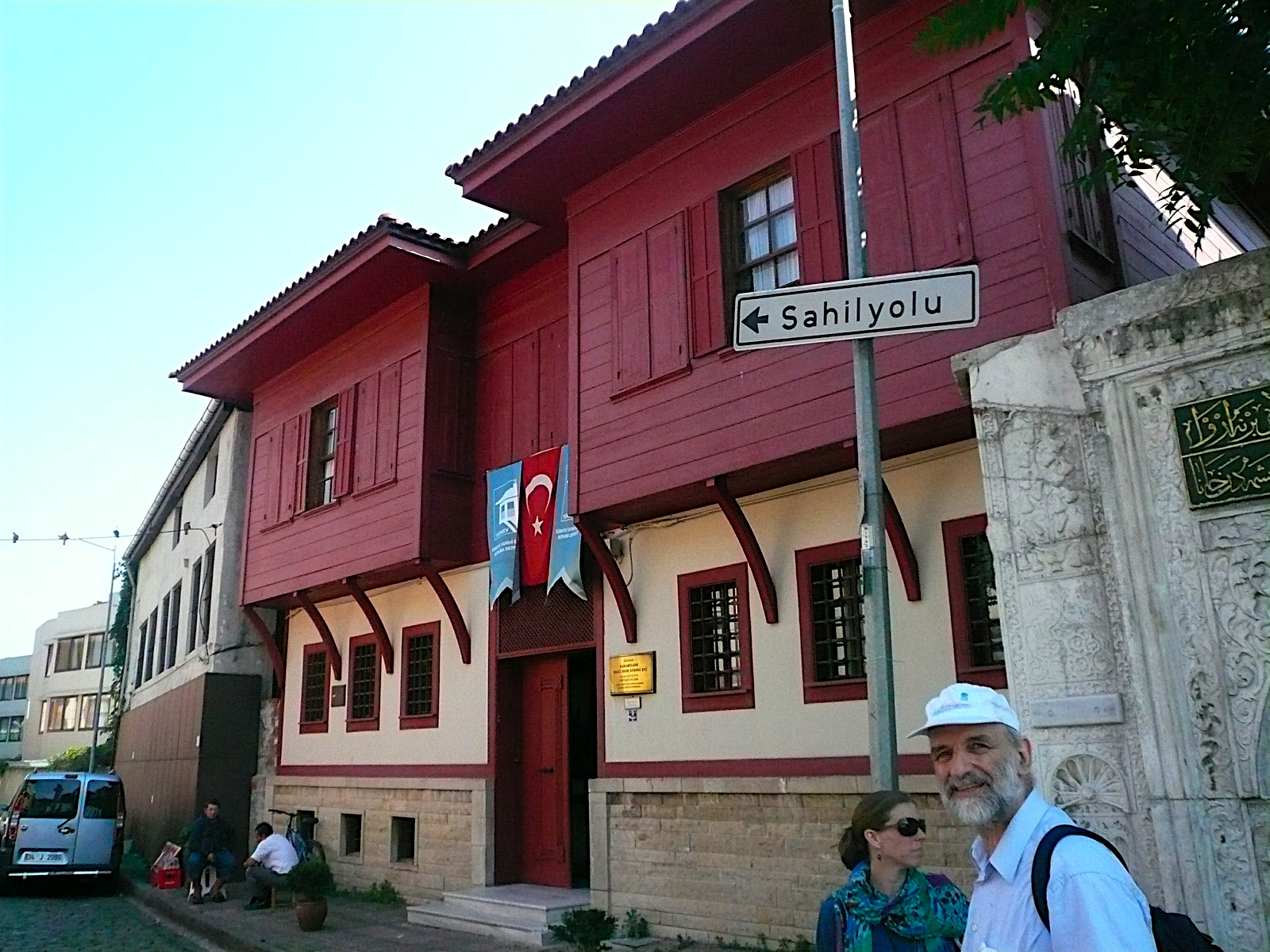
His museum in Cankurtaran

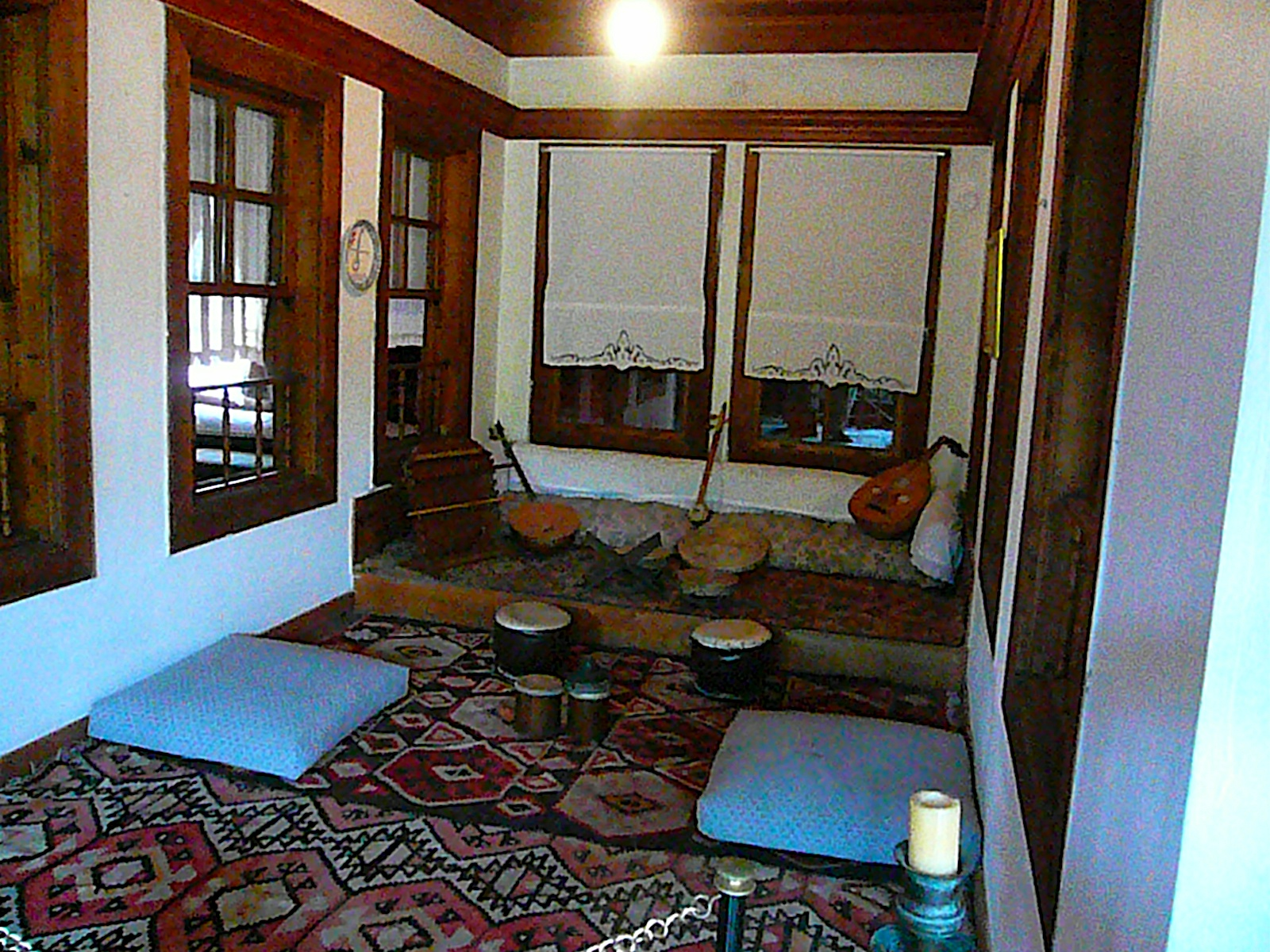
His original instruments

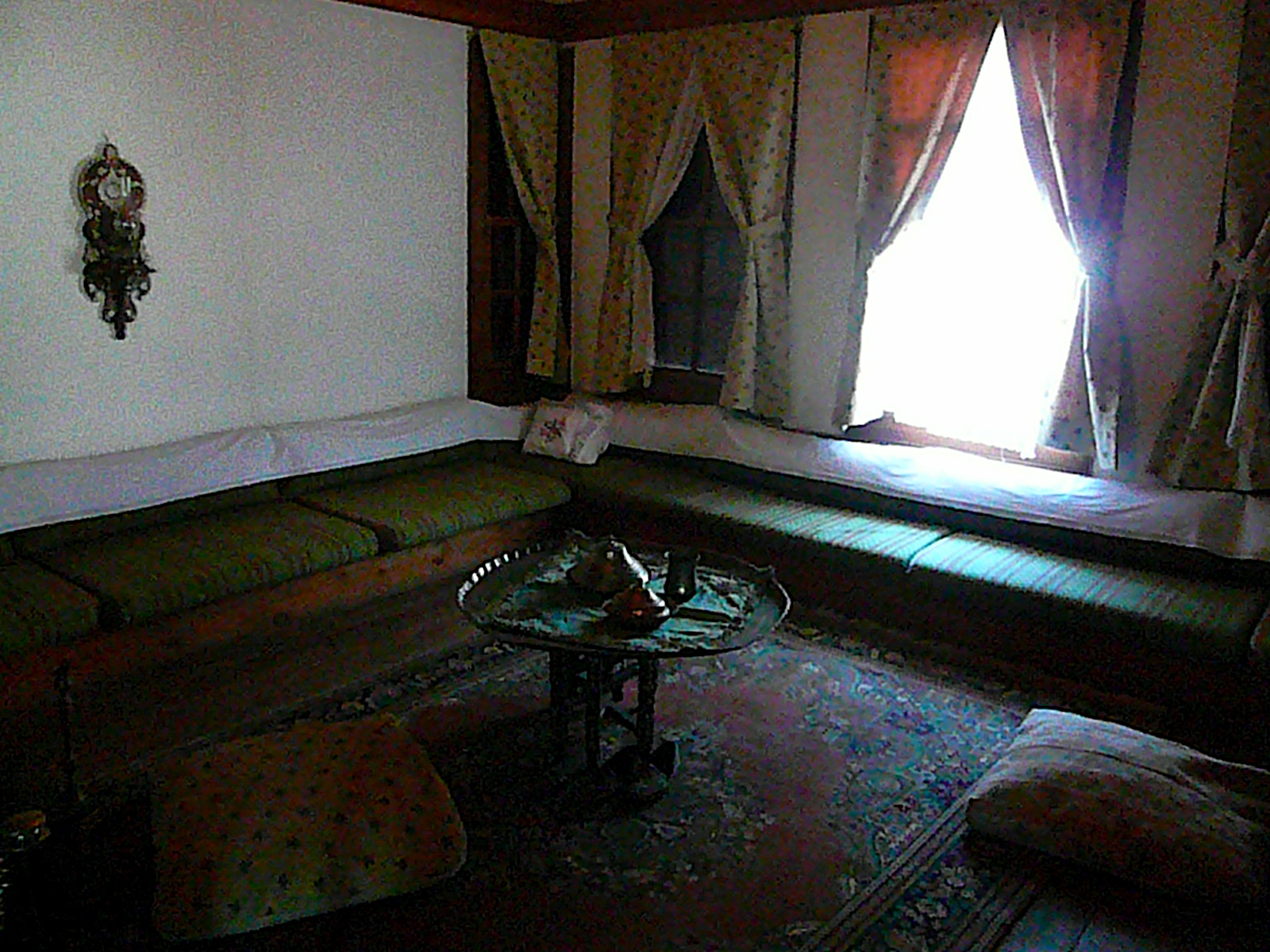
Music Salon

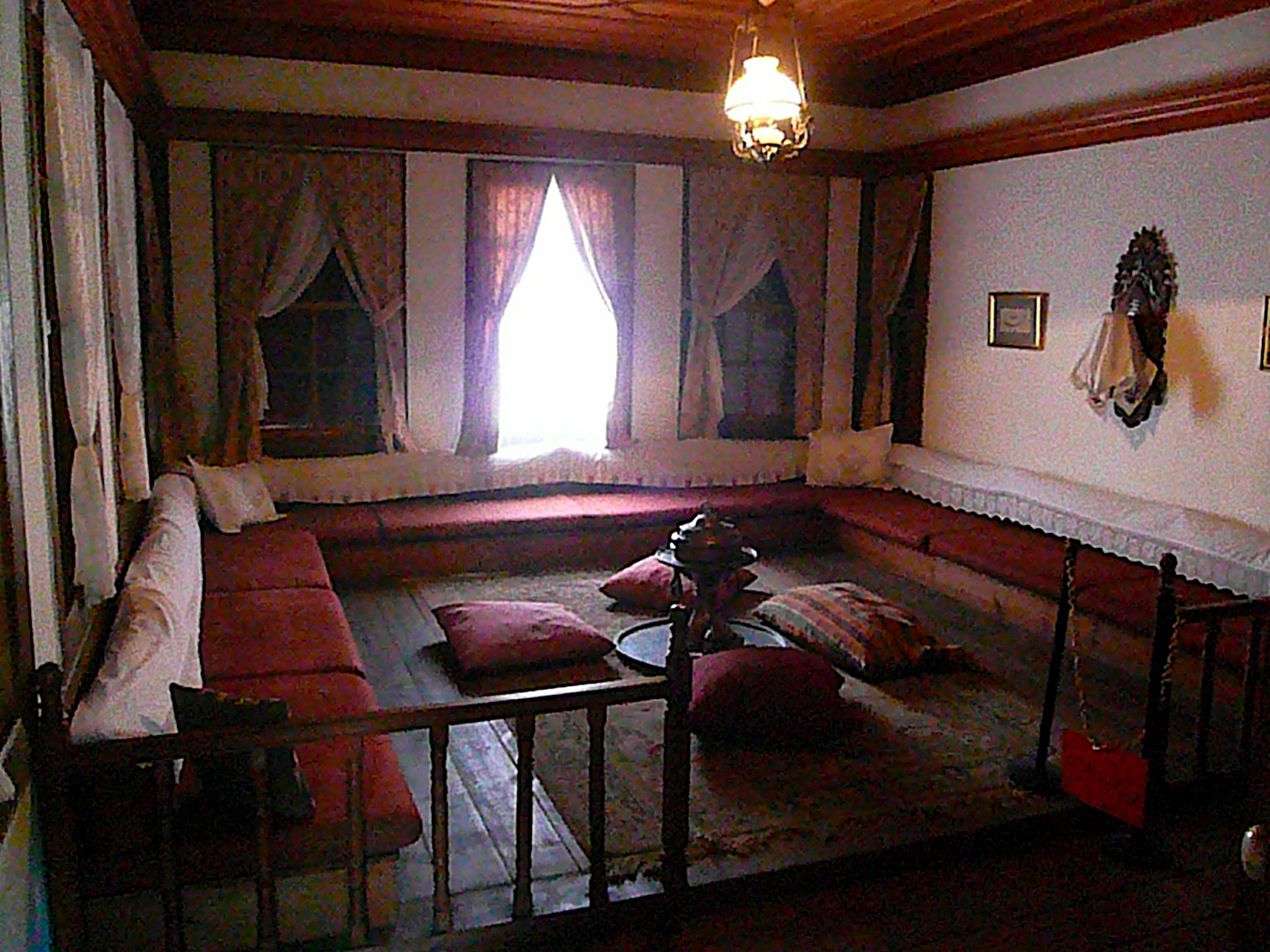
Guest Salon

== See also ==
- Hafız Post
- Tanburi Cemil Bey
- Tanburi Büyük Osman Bey
