= Longa (Middle Eastern music) =

A longa (Arabic: لونجا) is a Turkish / Eastern European dance, that was later introduced into Arabic music and is often performed at the end of a muwashshah.

It generally uses an iqa' equivalent to 2/4, with several sections called khanat (singular khana), each followed by a taslim (refrain). The last khana is generally in 3/4.

A common form of longa is longa Riad in Nahawand scale (لونجا نهاوند) which is composed by the Egyptian composer Riad Al Sunbati in the maqam Nahawand.

== See also ==
- Syrtos
- Fasıl
- Pop-folk
