= Buhûrizâde Abdülkerim Efendi =

- Born: 1698; Ottoman Empire
- Died: 1778 (aged 79–80) Constantinople, Ottoman Empire
- Occupation: Music composer

Buhûrizâde Abdülkerim Efendi was an Ottoman poet, composer and Sufi prayer leader. In his compositional work, poetry or music, Buhûrizâde wrote under the name Kemter, a Sufi pseudonym meaning "poor", or "pitiful".

Buhûrizâde most of his life in Constantinople. As a teenager, he entered the Kocamustafapaşa tekke of the Sünbüliyye Sufi order, which was led, at the time, by Nûreddin Efendi. After a period of training and study, he was appointed zâkirbaşı, or prayer-leader, of the tekke.

Buhûrizâde later became the leader of the Şah Sultan Sünbüliyye tekke in Eyüp, a position he held well into his eighties, when he died.

Buhûrizâde is considered one of the most important composers of religious music in the mid to late 18th century in the Ottoman EmpireOnly five complete compositions by Buhûrizâde are available today. The rest of his vast repertoire are only recorded through the contemporary writings of others.

== See also ==
- List of composers of classical Turkish music
