= Bekir Sıdkı Sezgin =

- Born: 1936; Istanbul, Turkey
- Died: 1996 (aged 59–60) Istanbul, Turkey
- Genres: Ottoman classical music Turkish makam music
- Occupations: Composer, lyrics author

Bekir Sıtkı Sezgin (1936–1996), also written as Bekir Sıdkı Sezgin, was a musician in the Turkish classical style.

== Life ==
In 1959, Sezgin passed the entrance exam needed to join TRT's İzmir Radio, and began to work in this organization as an "accomplished musician". The same year, he achieved the position of soloist performer with the title of "first class vocal performer". Sezgin retired from the TRT in 1980.

== See also ==
- List of composers of classical Turkish music
