= Free time (music) =

Type of musical anti-meter

Free time is a type of musical anti-meter free from musical time and time signature. It is used when a piece of music has no discernible beat. Instead, the rhythm is intuitive and free-flowing. In standard musical notation, there are seven ways in which a piece is indicated to be in free time:

1. There is simply no time signature displayed. This is common in old vocal music such as Gregorian Chant.
2. There is no time signature but the direction 'Free time' is written above the stave.
3. There is a time signature (usually 4/4) and the direction 'Free time' written above.
4. The word FREE is written downwards across the stave. This is mostly used when the piece changes to free time after having had a time signature.
5. Instead of a time signature, a large X is written on the stave.
6. Note heads alone are used, without time values (typically black note heads without stems)
7. The passage is marked "recitativo" or "parlando"

Examples of musical genres employing free time include Gregorian chant, the petihot used as transitions between Baqashot in Sephardic Jewish cantillation, nusach, layali, early types of organum, Anglican chant, the préludes non mesurés of 17th-century French lute and keyboard music, the alap of Hindustani classical music, Javanese pathetan, the hora lungă of Romania, the urtiin duu of Mongolia, the Zulu izibongo, free improvisation, free jazz and noise music. Cadenzas are most often in unmeasured rhythm, and so is recitative. Examples of music written in free time include Erik Satie's Gnossienne No. 1, Charles Ives' Concord Sonata, and most of Kaikhosru Shapurji Sorabji's music.

Today, free time music is still a popular style of music, used by composers and performers to create a sense of freedom and spontaneity in their work.

The usage of free time is almost absent in popular music. The Allman Brothers Band was known for occasionally dropping into free time segments on their lengthy live jams. An example can be found on "Whipping Post" on the live album At Fillmore East. The band drops into a lengthy free time at the 10-minute mark, before coming back into 11/8 time about 5 and a half minutes later. They drop into free time again at the 17:15 mark and continue to the end of the song at about 23:00.

Another example is in the nearly 10-minute psychedelic Pink Floyd composition "Interstellar Overdrive", wherein the opening riff eventually turns into improvisation, including modal improvisations, percussive flourishes on the Farfisa organ, and quiet interludes. The song gradually becomes almost structureless and in free-form tempo, punctuated only by strange guitar noises. Eventually, however, the entire band restates the main theme, which is repeated with decreasing tempo and more deliberate intensity.
