= Ahmet Yektâ Madran =

- Born: 1885; Kırkağaç, Manisa, Ottoman Empire
- Died: 1950 (aged 64–65)
- Genres: Ottoman classical music Turkish makam music
- Occupation: composer

Ahmet Yektâ Madran (1885-1950) was a composer of Turkish music pieces, school songs, and marches.

== Life ==
Madran trained as a band musician at İzmir Art School and learned to play the clarinet. After school, he became the instructor for the military band in Edirne, where he received a serious injury to one of his eyes. In 1908, Madran joined the Mızıka-i Humayun. He was later sent for duty to Egypt, where he joined a German music ensemble. Madran toured with this ensemble as their soloist. After the declaration of the Turkish Republic, Madran was appointed as the conductor of the Presidential Symphony Orchestra, now called the Riyaset-i Cumhur in Ankara.

Madran was part of a group of artists commissioned by Enver Pasha in 1915 to depict the Gallipoli battlefront.

== See also ==
- List of composers of classical Turkish music
