= Yürük semai =

Musical form in Ottoman classical music

A yürük semai (also spelled yürük sema'i, yürük sema i, or yürük semâ'î) is a musical form in Ottoman classical music. It was a movement of a fasıl (suite). It is generally composed in an usul (rhythmic structure) of 6/8 or 6/4.

Tanburi Cemil Bey was a noted composer of yürük semai.

In Arabic music, there is an iqa' (rhythmic mode) called yūruk samā'ī (يورك سماعي), which is commonly used in the muwashshah genre.

== See also ==
- Saz semai
- Sama'i
