= Lavta =

Plucked string instrument from İstanbul

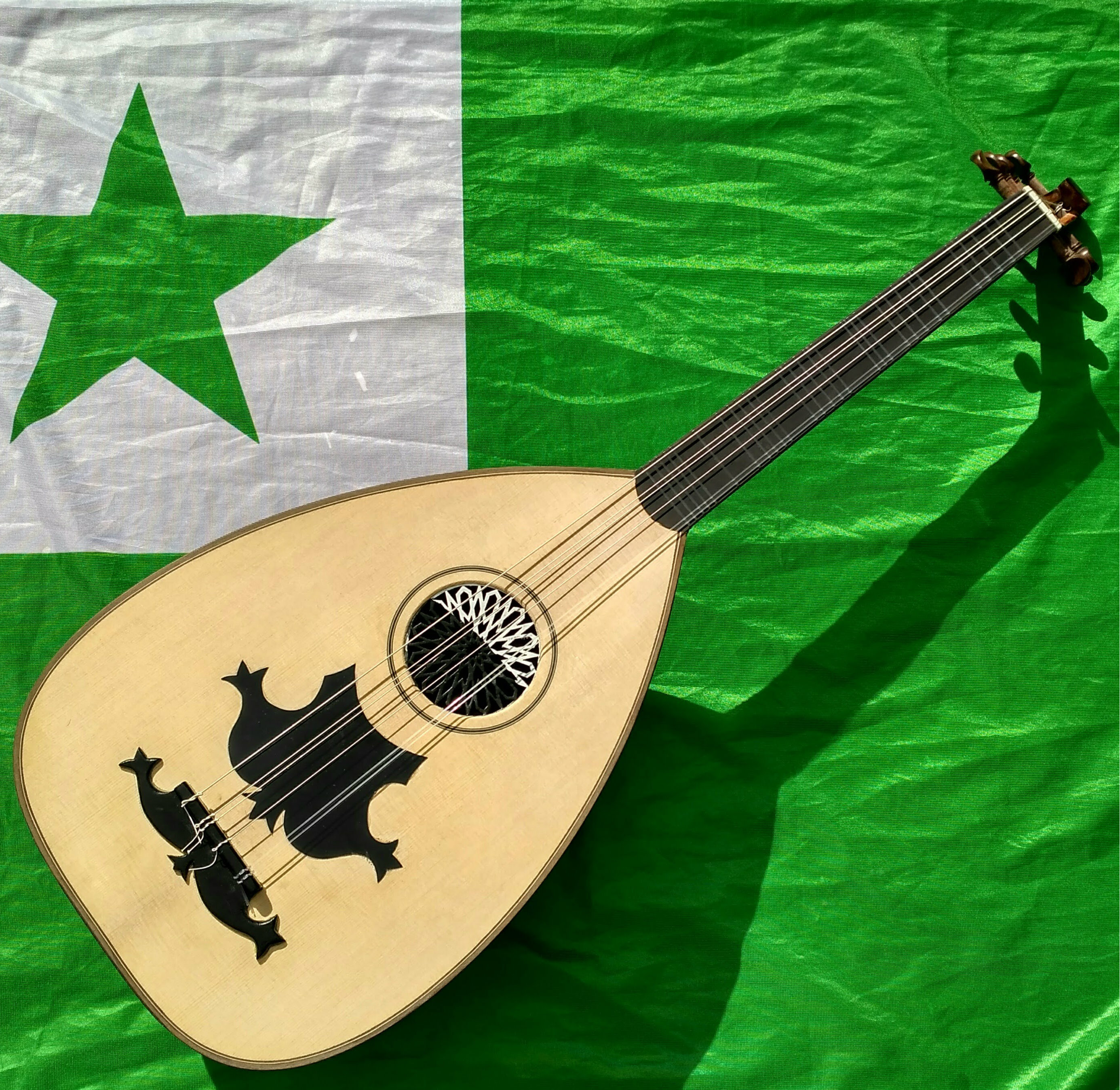
- Front view of a lavta

String instrument
- Other names: Politiko Laouto, πολιτικο λαουτο
- Classification: Necked bowl lutes; String instruments
- Hornbostel–Sachs classification: 321.321 (Composite chordophone sounded with a plectrum)

Related instruments
- Barbat (lute), Baglamadaki, Bağlama, Biwa, Bouzouki, Dombra, Domra, Dutar, Lavta, Lute, Mandocello, Mandola, Mandolin, Mandole, Oud, Pipa, Qanbus

The lavta is a plucked string music instrument from Istanbul.

== Description ==
The Politiko Laouto has a small body made of many ribs made using carvel bending technique. Its appearance is somewhat like a small (Turkish) oud - the strings are made from gut like an oud but it has only 7 strings in 4 courses and is tuned D AA dd aa, it is also sometimes tuned to Turkish Bolahenk tuning C G D A. The adjustable frets are made from tied nylon (historically gut) on the fingerboard. Its the microtonal intervals of the makam system were added in the early 20th century, before which it was diatonic. It is more closely related to instruments like the tanbur than to the fretless oud and the diatonically fretted laouto. The bridge usually has peacock-shaped ends. The fingerboard is flush with the soundboard, the face is often unvarnished, and the soundboard has a carved and inlaid rosette. The politiko laouto has a pegbox like the oud (angling back), The tuning pegs are shaped like those of the violin, with 3 on the bottom and 4 on the top of the open tuning head.

== History ==
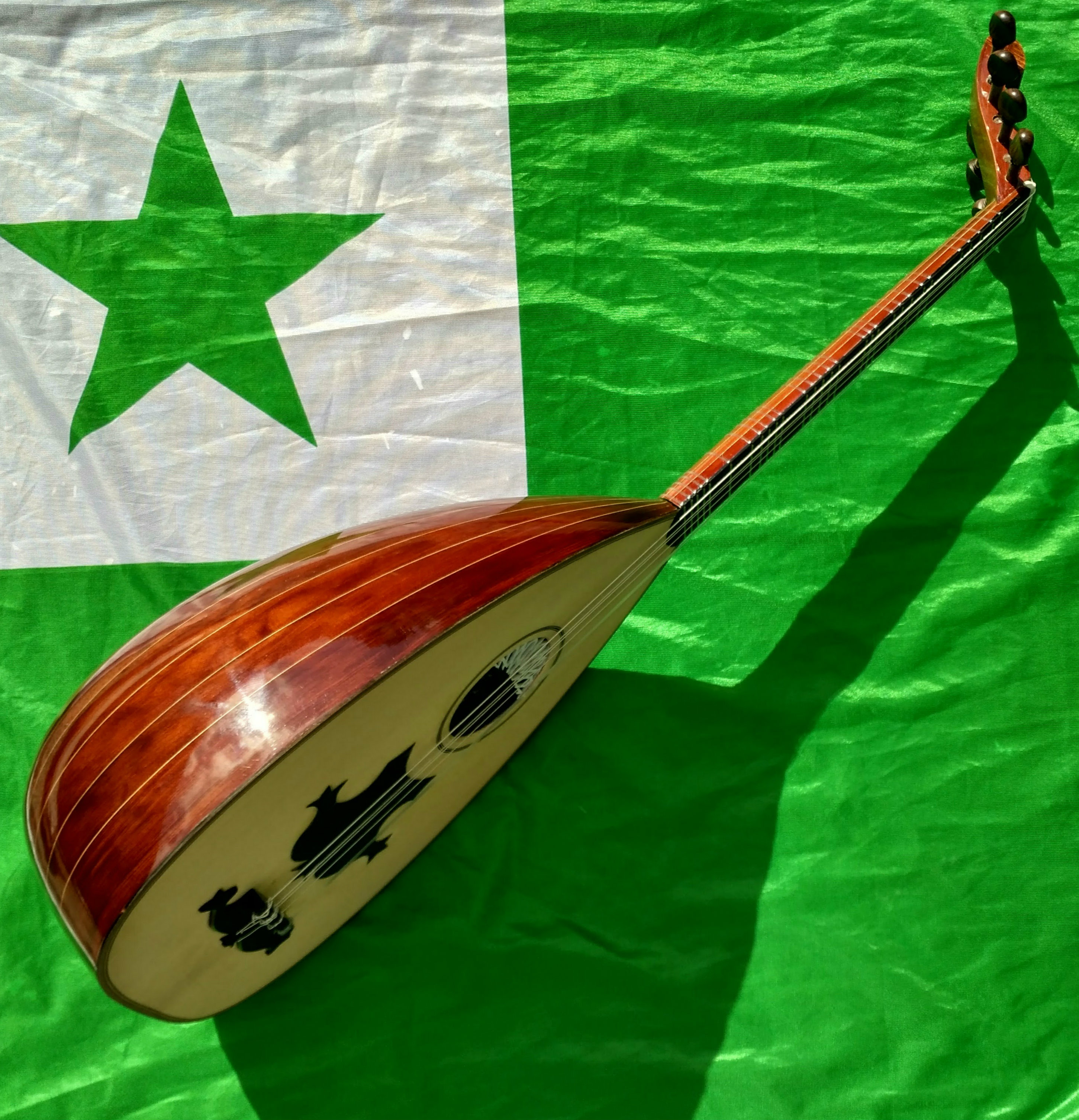
Side view of a lavta

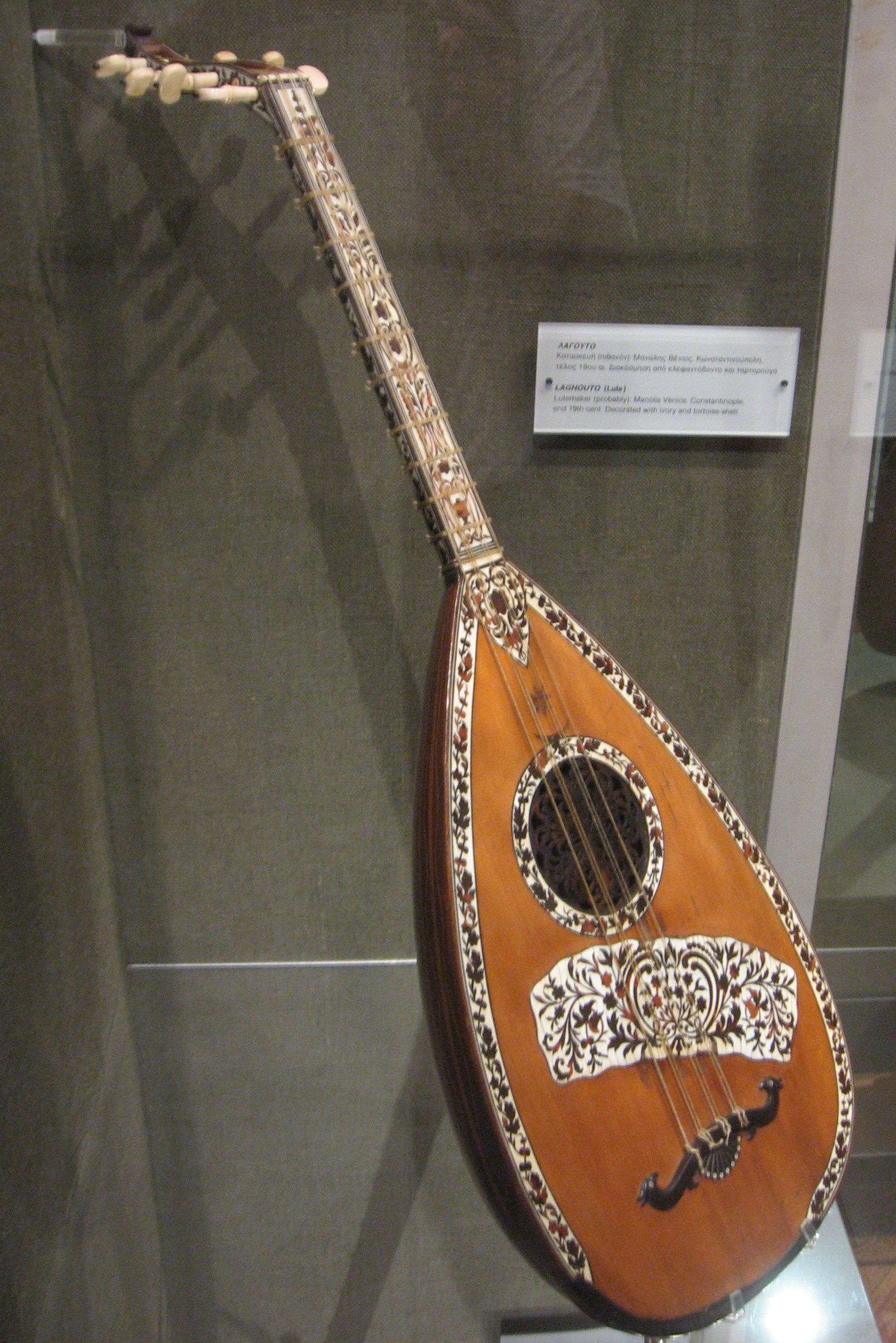
Historical lavta in a museum in Athens

The lavta, known as a lavuta (լավութա) in Armenian and Politiko laouto (Lute from Constantinople) or lafta in Greek, is an instrument that was popular in the late 19th and early 20th centuries, particularly among the Greek and Armenian communities. It was one of the many instruments played by noted musician and composer Tanburi Cemil Bey. It was gradually replaced by the oud, yet survives to this day. From the 1980s there has been a revival of interest in this instrument, and now it is possible to find the lavta again mainly in Greece and also in Turkey.

Right hand technique is similar to an oud, with a long thin plectrum.

== See also ==
- Laouto
- Rud
- Shahrud
- Kobza

== Sources ==
- http://www.atlasofpluckedinstruments.com/middle_east.htm
