= Haji Arif Bey =

Turkish composer

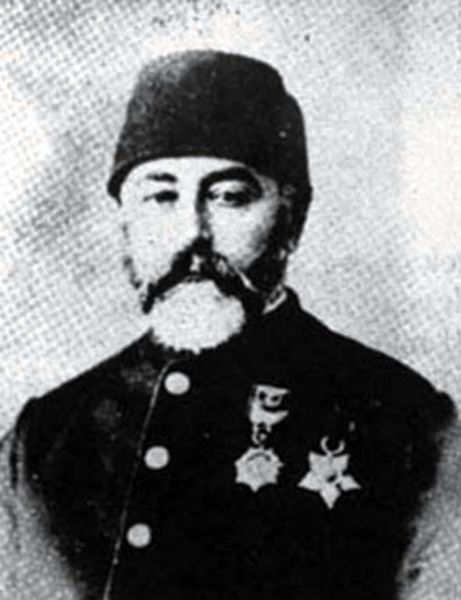
Haji Arif Bey

Haji Arif Bey (1831–1885) was a Turkish composer from Istanbul, most known for his compositions in the şarkı form, the most common secular form in Turkish classical music. He was a very prolific composer, who on some days, composed more than six or seven songs. From his third wife Nigârnik Hanım he has four great-grandchildren; Turkish diplomat Reha Aytaman, Şira Arıkoğlu, Okşan Aytaman and Murat Aytaman.

== Biography ==
He was born in the Eyüp district of Istanbul. He was taught by the famous Dede Efendi. After Sultan Abdülmecid I became aware of his beautiful voice, he was admitted to the Muzika-yi Humayun, which was the Imperial Military Music School in the Ottoman Empire. Due to his closeness to the Sultan, he was responsible for teaching music to the women in the harem. He fell in love with one of the Circassian concubines, Çeşm-i Dilber, and had two children with her. He composed several songs after she left him for a merchant. His second wife, also from the harem, died from tuberculosis, a cause for several songs by Arif Bey. He was elected the head singer in the palace, and married a third time with Circassian Nigârnik Hanım, and stayed with her until his death.

Toward the end of his life, Haji Arif Bey had a fall out with the emperor Abdul Hamid II at the time, and was jailed for about 50 days. While there, he composed several songs, which were later appreciated by Abdul Hamid II, and he was forgiven. He taught at the Imperial Music School for the rest of his life.

== Major works ==
- Olmaz ilâç sine-i sad pâreme
- Bakmıyor çeşm-i siyah feryâde
- Vücud ikliminin sultanı sensin
- Meyhanemi bu, bezm-i tarahhane-i cem mi
- Çekme elem-i derdini bu dehr-i fenanın
- Deva yokmuş neden bimarı aşka
- Geçti zahm-i tîri hicrin ta dil-i naşadıma
- İltimas etmeye yâre varınız
- Gözümden gitmiyor bir dem hayalin
- Kanlar döküyor derdin ile dide-i giryan
- Hâtırımdan çıkmaz asla ahd u peymânın senin
- Sayd eyledi bu gönlümü bir gözleri âhû
- Gurub etti güneş dünya karardı
- Çözülme zülfüme ey dil rüba, dil bağlayanlardan
- Ben buy-i vefa bekler iken sûy-i çemende
- Humarı yok bozulmaz meclis-i meyhane-i aşkın
- Tasdî edeyim yari biraz da sühanimle
- Bir halet ile süzdü yine çeşmini dildar
- Esti nesîm-i nevbahar açıldı güller subh dem
- Mükedder derd-i pey-der peyle şimdi
- Kurdu meclis, âşıkan meyhanede
- Bülbül yetişir bağrımı hûn etti figanın
- Nigâh-ı mestine canlar dayanmaz
- Zahir-i hale bakıp etme dahil bir ferdi
- Bahar oldu beyim evde durulmaz
