= Sama'i =

Music genre

Sama'i (also known as usul semai) is a vocal piece of Ottoman Turkish music composed in 6/8 meter. This form and meter (usul in Turkish) is often confused with the completely different saz semaisi, an instrumental form consisting of three to four sections, in 10/8 meter, or usul aksak semai (broken semai in Turkish).

Semai is one of the most important forms in Ottoman Turkish Sufi music.

== Sample songs ==
Songs	Composer
Gel ey denizin nazlı kızı nûş-i şarab et	Aleko Bacanos
Bir verd-i rana ettim temaşa	Hammamizade İsmail Dede Efendi
Dil-hûn olurum yâd-ı cemâlinle senin ben	Bimen Şen
Sana dün bir tepeden baktım Aziz İstanbul	Münir Nurettin Selçuk
Bahçemde açılmaz seni görmezse çiçekler	Münir Nurettin Selçuk
Hülyâya dalar sonra perîşan uyanırdım	Yesari Asım Arsoy
Gönlüm kuru bir gül titrerken adında	Cevdet Çağla
Mihrâbım diyerek sana yüz vurdum	Avni Anıl
Ela na filithoume	anonymous
Menekşe Ve Sümbül(Μενεξέδες και Ζουμπούλια)	anonymous
Yine bir gülnihal	Hammamizade İsmail Dede Efendi
Ey büt-i nev edâ olmuşum müptelâ	Hammamizade İsmail Dede Efendi
Gül Yüzlülerin Şevkine Gel	Tab'i Mustafa Efendi
Terk Eyledi Gerçi Beni Ol Mâh Cemâlim	Zaharya Efendi Mir Cemil
Sakın Dönme Geriye	Taner Şener
Etti O Güzel Ahde Vefâ Müjdeler Olsun	Eyyûbî Bekir Ağa
Nasıl geçti habersiz o güzelim yıllarım	Teoman Alpay
Veda Busesi	Yusuf Nalkesen
Buruk Acı	Teoman Alpay
Sarmaşık Gülleri	Teoman Alpay
Gönlümün bülbülüsün aşk bahçemin gülüsün	Alâeddin Yavaşca

External videos
- Gel ey denizin nazlı kızı nûş-i şarab et (Aleko Bacanos
- Bir verd-i rana ettim temaşa (Hammamizade İsmail Dede Efendi)
- Dil-hûn olurum yâd-ı cemâlinle senin ben (Bimen Şen)
- Sana dün bir tepeden baktım Aziz İstanbul (Münir Nurettin Selçuk)
- Bahçemde açılmaz seni görmezse çiçekler (Münir Nurettin Selçuk)
- Hülyâya dalar sonra perîşan uyanırdım (Yesari Asım Arsoy)
- Gönlüm kuru bir gül titrerken adında (Cevdet Çağla)
- Mihrâbım diyerek sana yüz vurdum (Avni Anıl)
- Ela na filithoume
- Μενεξέδες και Ζουμπούλια -Menekşe Ve Sümbül
- Yine bir gülnihal (Hammamizade İsmail Dede Efendi)
- Ey büt-i nev edâ olmuşum müptelâ (Hammamizade İsmail Dede Efendi)
- Gül Yüzlülerin Şevkine Gel (Tab'i Mustafa Efendi)
- Terk Eyledi Gerçi Beni Ol Mâh Cemâlim (Zaharya Efendi Mir Cemil)
- Sakın Dönme Geriye - Taner Şener
- Etti O Güzel Ahde Vefâ Müjdeler Olsun(Eyyûbî Bekir Ağa)
- Nasıl geçti habersiz o güzelim yıllarım(Teoman Alpay)
- Veda Busesi(Yusuf Nalkesen)
- Buruk Acı(Teoman Alpay)
- Sarmaşık Gülleri (Teoman Alpay)

== See also ==
- Saz semai
- Yürük semai
- Waltz
- Dede Efendi
