= Hafız Post =

Ottoman musician (c. 1630–1694)

Hafiz Post (c. 1630–1694) was a composer and performer of Ottoman music during the Ottoman Empire era in Constantinople.

== Biography ==
His father was an imam. He was trained well in literature, music and foreign languages such as Persian and Arabic. He was a member of Halvetiye order and became a hafiz. After travelling to Mecca (modern Saudi Arabia which then was a part of the Ottoman Empire) for the Islamic pilgrimage, he returned to the Ottoman capital Constantinople where he began attending to fasıls (chorus) of Ottoman classical music in the palace of the Ottoman Sultan Mehmed IV (reigned 1648-1687) both as a singer and as a tambur player. Like most other musicians, he was supported by Selim I Giray, the Crimean Khan who was a musician himself and probably his tutor in tambur playing.

== Other interests ==
Hafız Post was a divan poet. But only a very few verses survive. He was also interested in calligraphy.
