= Bestâmi Yazgan =

Turkish composer

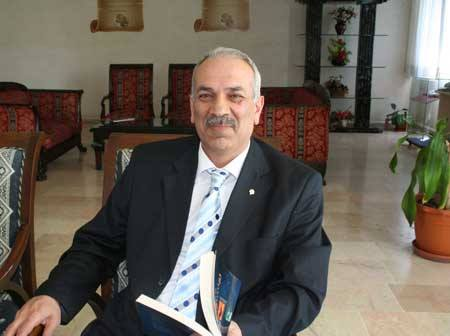

Background information
- Born: 1957 (age 68–69); Osmaniye, Turkey
- Genres: Ottoman classical music Turkish makam music
- Occupation: Lyrics author

Bestâmi Yazgan (born 1957, in Toprakkale, Osmaniye, Turkey) is a Turkish composer, poet and author of children's books. He graduated from Atatürk University, School of Literature in 1978. Currently, he teaches literature at Istanbul Vefa High School in addition to working as editor in chief of the periodical Güneysu Kültür, Sanat ve Edebiyat Dergisi that has been published in Osmaniye for 16 years.

His books have been subject to several academic papers in Turkey.

The poetry competition Bestami Yazgan Şiir Yarışması was named after him.

== Works ==
- (2009). Gözlük takan yıldızlar, İstanbul: Nar Yayınları.
- (2011). Olimpiyat ormanı İstanbul: Nar Yayınları.
- (2011). Paten giyen kaplumbağa İstanbul: Nar Yayınları.
- (2011). Sıcak ekmek kokusu İstanbul: Nar Yayınları.
- (2012). Oruç nasıl tutulur İstanbul: Nar Yayınları.
- (2013). Düğün yemeği İstanbul: Nar Yayınları.
- (2013). Hayat sevince güzel İstanbul: Nar Yayınları.
- (2015). Kuşların masalı. İstanbul: Nar Yayınları.
- (2016). Masal denizi. İstanbul: Nar Yayınları.
- (2016). Mutluluğun formülü. İstanbul: Nar Yayınları.
- (2017). Kalbini kaybeden adam. İstanbul: Nar Yayınları.

== See also ==
- List of composers of classical Turkish music
