= Gazel =

Form of Turkish music

Gazel is a form of Turkish music. While in other parts of West Asia, gazel is synonymous with ghazal, in Turkey it denotes an improvised form of solo singing, that is sometimes accompanied by the ney, ud, or tanbur. It is the vocal equivalent to the Turkish taqsim, an improvised instrumental composition.

The form began to die out in the mid-20th century because of its associations with nightclubs, but it has recently begun a revival process.
