= Zaharya Efendi Mir Cemil =

- Born: Zaccharias; Ottoman Empire
- Died: 1740 Ottoman Empire
- Genres: Ottoman classical music

Zaharya Efendi Mir Cemil (Greek: Ζαχαρίας ο χανεντές; died 1740) was a composer of Turkish classical music. He was of Greek origin. Zaharya was said to have served as head cantor at the Greek Orthodox Patriarchate in Fener.
