= Bekir Büyükarkın =

- Born: 1921; Constantinople, Turkey
- Died: 7 August 1998 (aged 76–77) Istanbul, Turkey
- Genres: Ottoman classical music Turkish makam music
- Occupation: Lyrics author

Bekir Büyükarkın (1921 – 7 August 1998) was a Turkish poet, novelist and playwright. He graduated from Istanbul Vefa High School in 1939. He went on to the Istanbul University School of Economics and Administrative Sciences and graduated in 1942.

Büyükarkın worked as an accountant at an insurance company and at Türk Ticaret Bankası until 1960, when he set up his own accounting business and started to publish his writings. Known for his novels and plays, he also wrote two unpublished poetry books. His play, Dökmeci, won the competition for stage plays organized by CHP.

Büyükarkın was the founder of the Vefa'dan Yetişenler Association and the Musiki Culture Association; he was also the chairman of the council of the Vefa Club.

== Writings ==
=== Poetry ===
- Eski Dost (1959)
- Rüzgâr (1965)

=== Novels ===
- Cadıların Kırbacı (1946)
- Maske (1955)
- Bir Sel Gibi (1962)
- Son Akın (1963)
- Belki Bir Gün (1965)
- Suların Gölgesinde (1966)
- Bozkırda Sabah (1969)
- Tanyeri (1967)
- Kutlu Dağ

=== Theatre ===
- Dökmeci (1954),
- Yarısı (1967)
- Üç Oyun (Armutlar - Yolcular - Tanyeri / 1970)
- Duman (1970)
- İki Oyun (Duman - Keçiler / 1970)
- Soytarı (1974)

== See also ==
- List of composers of classical Turkish music
