= Saz semai =

The saz semai (also spelled in Turkish as saz sema'i, saz sema-i, saz sema i, saz semaī, saz semâ'î, sazsemai, saz semaisi, or sazsemaisi and in the Arab world as samâi) is an instrumental form in Ottoman classical music. It was typically the closing movement of a fasıl (i.e. suite). The saz semai is metered and typically uses the usul (rhythmic structure) called aksak semai.

A saz semai is typically in 4 movements, called hane (lit. "house"), each movement followed by a teslim (refrain). The teslim and the first three hane are usually in rhythm structure 10/8, unlike the fourth hane which is usually in 6/4, 3/4, or 6/8.

== Common Saz Semaisi ==
Some Saz Semaisi are very well-known and played in the all makam music area (From Greece to Iraq, and from Iraq to Morocco).

Here a few of them :

- Semâi al Thakil - also called : Arap saz semai. This samai is in makam Bayati.
- Semâi Al-Aryan - also called : Samâi Bayati.
- Semâi Shad Araban - Sed-i-Araban Saz Semaisi. Composed by Tanburi Cemil Bey.
- Semâi Husseyni. Composed by Tatyos Efendi.
- Semâi Nahawand - Nihavend Saz Semaisi. Composed by the son of Tanburi Cemil Bey : Mesut Cemil (Son of Cemil Bey).

== Saz Semai's Composers ==
- Tanburi Cemil Bey was a noted composer of saz semai.
- Ismail Hakki Bey
- Misirli Ibrahim Effendi

== See also ==
- Sama'i
- Yürük semai
- Arabic Maqam
- Turkish makam

== Bibliography ==
- Walter Feldman : "Music of the Ottoman court : Makam, composition in the early Ottoman instrumental repertoire"; Intercultural Music Studies, 1996.
