= Fasıl =

Suite in Ottoman classical music

The fasıl is a suite in Ottoman classical music. It is similar to the Arabic nawba and waslah.

A classical fasıl generally includes movements such as taksim, peşrev, kâr, beste, ağır semâ'î, yürük semâ'î, gazel, şarkı and saz semâ'î, played continuously without interludes and interconnected through aranağme arrangements.

A modern fasıl typically includes movements such as taksim, peşrev, şarkı (ağır aksak), yürük semâ'î, Türk aksağı, taksim, şarkı (a few with increasing tempo) and saz semâ'î.

Traditional Fasıl (both classical and modern) is a musical act distinct from the performance of "oriental" or "arabesque" pop and folk songs found at meyhanes and taverns, which have come to be sometimes referred to by the same name.

== Şarkı ==
A şarkı is an art song in Ottoman classical music which forms one of the movements of a fasıl (suite). It is performed with an usul (metric structure). This kind of song is rarely performed today. In modern Turkish, şarkı is the common word for any song, Turkish or foreign.

=== History ===
Starting from the 19th century, the şarkı form began to occupy a more prominent place in musical sections. In the second half of this century, particularly being popularized by Hacı Ârif Bey, it became a dominant form, leading to the gradual neglect of other classical forms over time.

== See also ==
- Waslah
- Muwashshah
- Andalusi nawba
- Nuubaat
- Longa (Middle Eastern music)
