= Layali =

Term in Arabic music

Layālī (ليالي) is a style of unmetered modal improvisation, based on a maqam, performed by a singing voice in Arabic music. It is similar to the taqsim, which is performed by a solo instrument.

The layali generally serves as an introduction to a mawwāl. In the layali, the singer most often improvises using the common Arabic phrase "Yā ‘ayn yā layl" (يا عين يا ليل), which means "O eye, O night."

The term layālī is the plural form of the word layl (ليل, meaning "night").
