= Rhythm in Persian music =

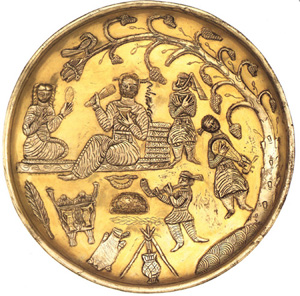
A 7CCE plate showing a female percussionist

Understanding the rhythmic aspect of Iranian music is aided by understanding the rhythmic structure of Persian poetry, the old Persian rhythmic cycles and the rhythmic characteristics of improvised and composed music. Analysis of more than fifty improvisations and pieces of composed music shows that the rhythmic organisation of gūsheh-ha and of musical genres in free metre, stretchable metre or fixed metre may be influenced by Persian poetic metres.

Music-related manuscripts from the twelfth to fifteenth centuries CE provide an opportunity to compare more than thirty different rhythmic cycles. The system of rhythmic cycles is no longer explicitly used in Iranian music but contemporary improvisation and composition reveals that their influence is still felt, as in current techniques of tombak performance.

This rich rhythmic vocabulary may bear ancestral relationship to the complex rhythms of India and certainly is related to traditional rhythms of North Africa and Ottoman Janissary and Turkish drumming.

The most common time signatures associated with the tombak are 6/8, 2/4, 4/4, 5/8, 7/8, and 16/8 times. Today the rhythmic ictus (beat or pulse) of the drum does not merely work as a metronome but is usually woven into the main fabric of the music as if it were any other (melodic) instrument.

== See also ==
- Persian traditional music
