= Cemil Bey =

Ottoman tanbur

Tamburi Cemil Bey (Ottoman: طنبورى جميل بك)
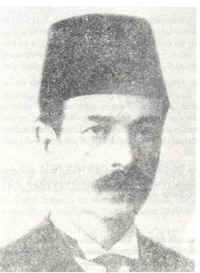

Background information
- Born: Cemil; 1871 or 1873; Istanbul, Ottoman Empire
- Died: July 28, 1916 (aged 43) Istanbul, Ottoman Empire
- Genres: Ottoman classical music
- Instrument(s): tanbur, kemençe, cello, lavta, yaylı tambur
- Labels: (reissues) Kalan

Tanburi Cemil Bey (1873, Istanbul – July 28, 1916, Istanbul) was an Ottoman tanbur, Turkish tambur, yaylı tambur, kemençe, and lavta virtuoso and composer, who has greatly contributed to the taksim (improvisation on a makam/maqam) genre in Ottoman classical music. His son, Mesut Cemil Bey, was an equally renowned Turkish tambur virtuoso.

== Biography ==
Cemil Bey was born in Istanbul, Ottoman Empire, in 1871 or 1873; his birth date is uncertain. He took his first lessons in music from Kanuni Ahmet Bey and the violin player Kemani Aleksan, his first instruments thus being the violin and the kanun. After completing middle school, he continued in a school for civil servants (Mülkiye), but then devoted himself to music and abandoned his education. He began to play the tanbur quite early in his youth and by the age of 20, his renown had already spread among the tamburis of Istanbul. Reforming the traditional playing technique of the tambur, he developed an energetic technique based on a rich and agile picking style, lightening to a great extent the sonority of this instrument. Later on, he set about playing the Turkish classical kemençe and attained an astonishingly high level of technique, so much so that the virtuosity level of the Ottoman kemençevi of Greek origin Vasilaki (1845–1907), considered as then as "the reference", came to be thought of by certain amateurs to be outmatched. He was also the inventor of the Yaylı tambur.

Cemil Bey was able to play any instrument he picked up: he played lavta, cello, yaylı tambur, zurna and several other instruments with equal virtuosity. His taksims and instrumental works he recorded on 78rpms with tanbur, kemençe, lavta, cello and yaylı tambur had considerable impact on generations of musicians following him. The peşrevs and sazsemais he composed are pieces of great taste, requiring a developed performance technique.

According to close friend Mahmut Demirhan:

He bowed his way [on the kemençe] with unheard-of confidence, ease and serenity; from the very dense and close-together notes of high gerdaniye, high muhayyer, and even high çargah, playing melodies clearly and crisply, without falling the least out of tune nor making a faux-pas in fingering; and all of this without the slightest sign of discomfort on his face.

He was a very sensitive and nervous person, who eventually suffered from alcoholism. Most of his compositions have been preserved in his recordings, but some of his works were incomplete when he died.

== Compositions ==
- Bestenigâr Saz Semâî (Aksak semâî)
- Ferahfezâ Saz Semâî (Aksak semâî)
- Ferahfezâ Peşrev (Muhammes)
- Hicâzkâr Peşrev (Muhammes)
- Hicâzkâr Saz Semâî (Aksak semâî)
- Isfahân Saz Semâî (Aksak semâî)
- Isfahân Peşrev (Devr-i kebîr)
- Kürdîlihicâzkâr Peşrev (Muhammes)
- Mâhûr Peşrev (Muhammes)
- Mâhûr Peşrev (Muhammes)
- Muhayyer Saz Semâî (Aksak semâî)
- Muhayyer Peşrev (Devr-i kebîr)
- Nevâ Peşrev (Devr-i kebîr)
- Şedarabân Saz Semâî (Aksak semâî)
- Şedarabân Peşrev (Fahte)
- Sûz-i Dilarâ Saz Semâî (Aksak semâî)
- Nikrîz Zeybek (Aksak)
- Nikrîz Longa (Nîm sofyân)
- Kürdîlihicâzkâr Şarkı (Aksak) - Def-i Nalis Eylerim Hep Seyri Ruhsarınla Ben
- Hüseynî Şarkı (Devr-i hindî) - Gormek Ister Gozlerim
- Şehnâz Şarkı (Sengîn semâî) - Feryad Ki Feryadım
- Nihâvend Şarkı (Yürük semâî) - Sevdim Seni Ey İşvebaz
- Mâhûr Şarkı (Ağır Aksak semâî) - Var İken Zâtında Böyle Hüsn-ü An
