= Taqsim =

Improvised instrumental solo in Middle Eastern music

Taqsim (Arabic: تَقْسِيم / ALA-LC: taqsīm, Sorani Kurdish: تەقسیم, Greek: ταξίμι, romanized: taksimi, Turkish: taksim) is a melodic musical improvisation that usually precedes the performance of a traditional Arabic, Kurdish, Greek, Middle Eastern, Iranian, Azerbaijani or Turkish musical composition.

Taqsim traditionally follows a certain melodic progression. Starting from the tonic of a particular Arabic maqam (or a Turkish makam), the first few measures of the improvisation remain in the lower ajnas of the maqam, thereby introducing the maqam to the listener. After this introduction, the performer is free to move anywhere in the maqam, and even to modulate to other maqams as long as they return to the original one.

Taqsim is either a solo instrument performance, or one that is backed by a percussionist or other instrumentalist playing a drone on the tonic of the maqam.

== See also ==
- Layali
- Zapin
- The cadenza in western classical and jazz music is a somewhat similar improvisation, albeit bound to different conventions.
