= Rhythm in Turkish music =

In Ottoman classical music, usul is an underlying rhythmic cycle that complements the melodic rhythm and sometimes helps shape the overall structure of a composition. An usul can be as short as two beats or as long as 128 beats. Usul is often translated as "meter", but usul and meter are not exactly the same. Both are repeating rhythmic patterns with more or less complex inner structures of beats of differing duration and weight. But a student learning Turkish music in the traditional meşk system first memorizes the usul kinetically by striking the knees with the hands. The student then sings the vocal or instrumental composition while performing the underlying usul. This pedagogical system helps the student memorize the composition while internalizing the underlying rhythmic structure.

Usul patterns have standard pronounceable vocables built from combinations of the syllables düm, dü-üm, tek, tekkyaa, teke, te-ek, where düm, dü-üm indicate a strong low beat of single or double duration, and tek, tekkya, teke, te-ek indicate various combinations of light beats of half, single or double duration. Long usuls (e.g., 28/4, 32/4, 120/4) are compound metric structures that underlie longer sections of entire compositions.

In Ottoman times, the usul was realized by drummers. Drums are generally omitted in modern performances except for Mevlevi. When performing music for the Mevlevi ceremony, drummers traditionally play embellished (velveleli) versions of the usuls.

Instrumental improvisations (taksim) and vocal improvisations (gazel, mersiye, etc.) are generally performed in "free" rhythm, with no usul.

The melodic counterpart to usul rhythmic mode is makam melodic mode. The parallel system to usul in Indian music is tala.

== Usul ==
=== Usuls based on number of beats per bar ===
- 2-) Nimsofyan
- 3-) Semâî
- 4-) Sofyan
- 5-) Zafer, Türk Aksağı (Süreyya)
- 6-) Yürüksemâî, Sengin Semaî, Ağır Semai
- 7-) Devr-i Hindî, Devr-i Turan (Mandra), Devr-i Aryân
- 8-) Düyek, Ağırdüyek, Katakofti (Müsemmen)
- 9-) Aksak, Ağır Aksak, Oynak, Evfer, Ağır Evfer, Bulgar Darbı (Darbıbulgar), Çiftesofyan (Raksaksağı)
- 10-) Aksaksemaî, Ağır Aksaksemaî
- 12-) Frenkçin
- 13-) Nimevsat
- 14-) Devrirevan
- 15-) Raksan
- 16-) Nimhafîf
- 28-) Devr-i Kebir
- 32-) Hafîf, Muhammes
- 88-) Darbıfetih

== See also ==
- Rhythm in Arabic music
- Rhythm in Persian music
