= Kalan Müzik =

- Founded: 1991
- Founder: Hasan Saltık
- Genre: Ethnic music, Turkish folk, Ottoman classical, Turkish fusion
- Country of origin: Turkey
- Location: Istanbul
- Official website: Kalan.com (English)

Kalan Müzik or Kalan Music for the West is a Turkish independent record label company based in Istanbul. It was founded in 1991 by Hasan Saltık. It specializes in releasing Saltık's recordings of classical and traditional ethnic and folk music from Turkey and the surrounding region. It is sometimes listed as Kalan Ses ("Kalan Audio" or "Kalan Sound"). Kalan has annual revenues of $3 million, and has released more than 400 albums.

From 1992 to 2002, some of Kalan's output met governmental opposition. In 2003, Saltık's work through Kalan made him a laureate of the international Prince Claus Awards for having "founded a small company to produce recordings of the highest quality which have been the catalyst for the revival of musical traditions and led to their dissemination worldwide [through] establishing a label which produces unparalleled recordings". Since 2004, the Turkish Culture Ministry hands out Kalan CDs to visiting dignitaries.

== Overview ==
In 1991, Kalan Müzik was founded by Hasan Saltık with $600 in capital. It was named after the pre-1936 name of the town of Tunceli (its founder's birthplace), but also means "Surviving Music" in Turkish. In 2004, it had annual revenues of $3 million.

Kalan's output started with reissues of old 78 rpm records of late Ottoman music, the legendary voices of Armenian and Greek minority singers, and of old great recordings of rebetika and klezmer music, from names such as Tanburi Cemil Bey, Udi Hrant, Yorgo Bacanos, or tango singer Seyyan Hanım.

A majority of Kalan's releases are Saltık's recordings of traditional music from the many communities and minorities in Turkey and neighbouring regions, such as Kurdish folk songs, Armenian chants, Turkish ballads, Judeo-Spanish tunes, authentic village ceremonial music, Romani melodies from Thrace, polyphonic Laz music from northeast Turkey, Zaza songs from Tunceli, the music of Pomaks (Slavonic Muslims originating from Bulgaria), Alevi Bektashi religious songs, and the music of traditional rituals from all parts of the region.

However, Kalan also produces and releases contemporary folk or fusion music such as the guitarist Erkan Oğur, the controversial Grup Yorum, the popular Yansımalar, or soundtracks of Turkish films such as Neredesin Firuze (2004) or The Last Ottoman: Yandim Ali (Son Osmanlı: Yandım Ali) (2007).

As of 2007, Kalan Müzik had released more than 400 albums.

== Reception ==
Because laws passed after the 1980 Turkish coup d'état banned songs in minority languages, especially in Kurdish (deeming them separatist), Kalan's output has sometimes met governmental opposition. In 1992, a release of Kurdish music sent Saltık to court. In 2002, his music-publishing license was confiscated after he issued an old folk song that featured the word "Kurdistan", which is taboo in Turkey. It was only a public outcry that eventually led to the sentence being reversed. However, after the 2002 elections and governmental change, a normalization of relations between Kalan and officials led to the point of the Culture Ministry handing out Kalan CDs to visiting dignitaries.

In 2003, Saltik's work through Kalan Müzik made him a laureate of Netherlands's international Prince Claus Awards on the theme "The survival and innovation of Crafts" for having "played a central role in the rescue, rediscovery and documentation of the cultural diversity of Turkish music". The jury concluded, "Saltik founded a small company to produce recordings of the highest quality which have been the catalyst for the revival of musical traditions and led to their dissemination worldwide. He has conserved and promoted the musical heritage of the area th[r]ough establishing a label which produces unparalleled recordings."

== Artists ==
Artists issued or reissued primarily by Kalan include:

Archival reissues of folk/rural artists

- Muharrem Ertaş
- Âşık Veysel Şatıroğlu
- Hacı Taşan

Archival reissues of urban/art musicians

- Safiye Ayla
- Yorgo Bacanos
- Tanburi Cemil Bey
- Sadettin Kaynak
- Udi Hrant
- Zeki Müren
- Münir Nurettin Selçuk
- Şükrü Tunar

Contemporary urban art musicians in Turkey

- İncesaz
- Niyazi Sayın
- Yansımalar
- Necdet Yaşar

Contemporary folk music performers

- Tolga Çandar
- İsmail Hakkı Demircioğlu
- Neşet Ertaş
- Erkan Oğur

Alevi musicians

- Dertli Divani
- Ulaş Özdemir

Anatolian ethnic music

- Mikail Aslan
- Aynur Doğan
- Kardeş Türküler
- Birol Topaloğlu

Protest and political music

- Grup Yorum
- Fikret Kızılok
- Tülay German
