= Necdet Yaşar =

Turkish musician and educator (1930-2017)

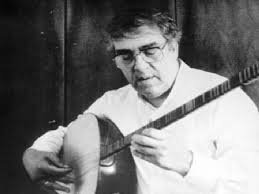
- Necdet Yaşar in 1972, performing for guests at a private home in Istanbul

Background information
- Born: 1930; Nizip, Gaziantep, Turkey
- Died: October 24, 2017 (aged 86–87) Istanbul, Turkey
- Genres: Classical Turkish music
- Instrument: Turkish tanbur lute
- Labels: Kalan, Golden Horn

Necdet Yaşar (Turkish pronunciation: [ˈnedʒdet ˈjaʃaɾ]; 1930 - October 24, 2017) was a Turkish tanbur lute player and teacher. A founding member of the Istanbul State Turkish Music Ensemble, he performed throughout the world as a cultural ambassador for Turkey and taught twice at the University of Washington (USA). In 1991, the Turkish government awarded him the title of "National Artist".

== Overview ==
In 1930, Necdet Yaşar was born into a Turkish family in Nizip, a small town near Gaziantep, Turkey. He graduated from the School of Economics, Istanbul University.

Professor Robert Garfias, Director of the Ethnomusicology Program at the University of Washington (Seattle, Washington State, USA)--on the recommendation of graduate student Karl Signell—appointed Yaşar as Visiting Artist for 1972–73 academic year [Signell 1977, p. xv]. Garfias again appointed Yaşar, together with the noted ney master Niyazi Sayın as University of Washington Visiting Artists for 1980-81 UW dept. of ethnomusicology, "Visiting Artists by Country".

While in residence at the University of Washington, Yaşar gave lectures on the makam system of Ottoman classical music.

In 1972, Yaşar and Signell attended the annual meeting of the Society for Ethnomusicology (SEM) where Yaşar in effect introduced the largely unknown Turkish Classical Music to ethnomusicologists by talking and performing on the tanbur [Tanburi Necdet Yaşar: Anılar—Dostlar. New York: Brainstorm, 2009, p. 263.]

In 1981 He met Alan Wenham-Prosser from England. He agreed to teach Alan and his children the complete makam list and system. This happened over the next 7 years. All the lessons were tape recorded. Yaşar later asked Alan to help preserve the true knowledge of the makams and the Traditional Turkish Art Music Society of Great Britain was started. Yaşar also asked Alan and his children to play a recital on Turkish Television to help with the revival of interest in the ancient makam system. As well as this in 1987 he asked Alan to write to the Turkish Culture Minister to help establish Yaşar's music group officially.

In 1988, Yaşar was a founding member of the Istanbul State Turkish Music Ensemble. He directed it until 1995 when he retired.

In 1988, Yaşar was a founding member of the Istanbul State Turkish Music Ensemble. He directed it until 1995 when he retired.

In 1991, the Turkish government awarded him the title of "National Artist" (Devlet Sanatçısı).

In small and large ensembles, including his own "The Necdet Yasar Ensemble", he has performed throughout the world, in Europe, East Asia, and North America, as a concert artist and ambassador of Turkish classical music.

Yaşar is noted for his command of the Turkish makam melodic modes, his influential tanbur techniques, and the construction of his taksim improvisations; as described by fRoots magazine, "Yaşar's technical mastery is absolute, in particular his use of the range of plectrum techniques that is at the heart of tanbur playing. However, as a musician, what most distinguishes him is his unparalleled knowledge of and insight into the Turkish classical repertoire and the improvisational possibilities presented by its modal system. Yasar is one of those few artists who are both guided by and themselves guide tradition." He "belongs to a musical lineage going back to at least Tanburi Cemil Bey", and continued with Mesut Cemil, of whom he was the principal student. His taksimler solo improvisations and his dual improvisations (beraber taksimleri) with ney flutist Niyazi Sayın are noted for their sensitivity.

Experts cite two particular facets amongst all of his skills that make him amongst the most important musicians of his time and culture: (1) his understanding of melodic movement (called in Turkish seyir within the complex musical modes (that are called in Turkish makam) that form the basis of traditional Turkish classical art music; he has even been called the "living embodiment of seyir today", and (2) his understanding (and taste) of how to employ the complex pitch-interval structure of Turkish classical music to a particular musical mode (makam) and piece; there is a theoretical definition of the musical pitch intervals used in this music, but there is wide acknowledgment amongst expert practitioners that good practice is not always in agreement with the theory, and Yaşar was widely consulted by even the most expert musicians about correct practice.

Yaşar died in Istanbul on October 24, 2017.
