= Hamiyet Yüceses =

Turkish singer (1915–1996)

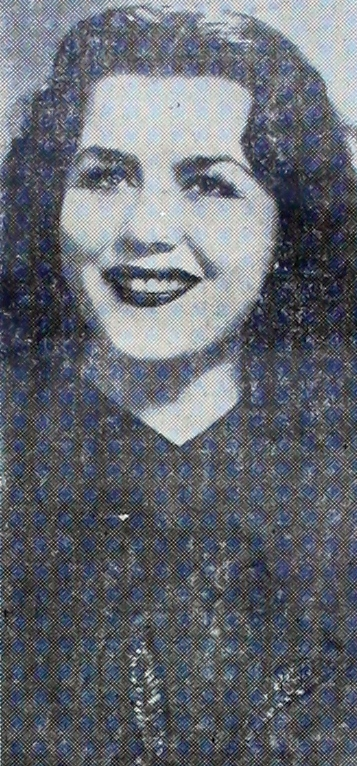
- Hamiyet Yüceses (Akşam, 1950)

Background information
- Born: 1915; Istanbul, Ottoman Empire
- Died: 10 July 1996 (aged 80–81) Marmaris, Muğla, Turkey
- Genres: Ottoman classical, Turkish folk
- Occupation: Singer
- Years active: 1927–1988
- Labels: His Master's Voice, Columbia Records, Odeon Records

Hamiyet Yüceses Sabuncu (1915 – 10 July 1996), best known by her stage name Hamiyet Yüceses, was a Turkish female singer of Ottoman classical music. She was a radio and music hall singer releasing a great number of records.

== Early years ==
Hamiyet Yüceses was born in Istanbul, Ottoman Empire, to Halil and his wife Kadriye in 1915. She had an older sister Hayriye and a brother Emin. An older sister Saime, the daughter of her mother from her former marriage, lived with the family. She was schooled in Bala Sibyan Mektebi (Bala Primary School) in Fatih district of Istanbul.

Her father was in the hookah hose business. She was a young girl when her father's business failed and he went bankrupt. The family fell into poverty, and all their possessions were sold.

Hamiyet acquired fame in the neighborhood for her beautiful singing voice. Encouraged by people around her, she took the stage in Burhaniye Balıkesir in 1927, at the age of eleven. Her stage appearances continued in many places throughout Anatolia. She became famous in Gaziantep. The citizens of that southeastern Anatolian place liked her very much as she was their own and did not want her to move away.

== Career ==
In the beginning of 1932, she returned to Istanbul, where her fame had spread. In 1934, she won a nationwide song contest. She signed a three-year contract with the Londra Birahanesi ("London Brewery"), one of the city's two big musical halls. In the winter season she appeared in the music hall, and in the summer season at Küçük Çiftlik ("Small Farm"), the open-air music garden inside the Maçka Park, run by the same businessman. During this time period, she took the stage in a program of the soloist Safiye Ayla.

She signed her first recording contract with the His Master's Voice label. Later, she sang for Columbia Records and Odeon Records. At the same time, she had weekly programs on the state-owned TRT Radio Istanbul, which was on the top floor of the Grand Post Office. She sang on around 500 gramophone records, 37 singles and 8 LP records.

Meanwhile, she took singing lessons from notable musicians like Selahattin Pınar (1902–1960), Sadettin Kaynak (1895–1961), Mustafa Nafiz Irmak (1904–1975), Yesari Asım Ersoy (1900–1992), and Artaki Candan (1885–1948). Sadettin Kaynak composed songs suitable to her voice type such as "Kirpiklerinin Gölgesi güllerle Bezenmiş" ("The shadows of your eyelashes are adorned with roses"), "Kalplerden Dudaklara" ("From hearts to lips"), and "Benim olsan seni bir gül gibi koklar sararım (Yasemen)" ("I would scent you like a rose if you were mine (Jasmine)").

Between 1950 and 1956, she served on the executive committee of Turkish classical music at the Istanbul Conservatory.

== Private life ==
In 1934, after the enacting of the Surname Law in Turkey, she adopted the family name Yüceses ("Almighty voice"), insistently recommended by Sadettin Kaynak and Selahattin Pınar.

In 1940, she married Petty Officer Fethi. Her husband died in the disaster of submarine TCG Atılay, which went down at Dardanelles on 14 July 1942. After her husband's death, she lamentingly sang "Gitti de Gelmeyiverdi Gözlerim Yolarda Kaldı" ("He's gone and did not show up, I have been waiting for a long time "), composed by Dede Efendi (1778–1846); many people thought that the classical song was her own work.

She married businessman Kemal Mollaoğlu in 1944. The couple separated at the end of 1955. She married in 1956 to Osman Sabuncu, a young student of medicine, who asked her to sing the love song "Dîl harâb ı Aşkınım Sensin Sebep Berbâdıma" during a performance at Cumhuriyet Music Hall. Her third marriage lasted 40 years until her death. She was a mother of two.

== Later years and death ==
Yüceses used the service of an artist manager for the first time in Turkey, a service provided by Mithat Babur which lasted from 1948 to 1955.

As well as appearing on the stage in almost every city in Turkey, Yüceses gave concerts abroad, including in Beirut, Lebanon (1952), Israel (1959), Cyprus (1960), London, New York City (1971), and Germany. She made her last stage performances at Istanbul Hilton in 1981. She occasionally sang during an event at Pera Palace Hotel organized in 1987 to honor her. She gave her last concert during the Altın Kelebek ("Golden Butterfly") award ceremony of the newspaper Hürriyet held at the Atatürk Cultural Center. She ended her singing career in 1988.

In 1995, she appeared in a television talk show of Halit Kıvanç and sang with renowned female singers Safiye Ayla, Müzeyyen Senar, Perihan Altındağ Sözeri and Zehra Bilir. This television program was her final performance.

She spent her last years in Datça district of Muğla Province at the Turkish Riviera. Hamiyet Yüceses died on 10 July 1996 at the age of 80 from respiratory disease and heart failure in a private hospital at Marmaris, Muğla, where she had been treated for ten days. Her body was transferred to Istanbul. She was interred at Karacaahmet Cemetery following a memorial service in front of the Radio Istanbul building and a religious funeral service at Erenköy Galip Pasha Mosque attended by a great number of notable musicians. She was survived by her husband Osman Sabuncu.

== Commemoration ==
In October 2016, a concert to commemorate the 20th anniversary of her death was held at the Cemal Reşit Rey Concert Hall (CRR) as part of the cultural program "Masters of Music" by the Metropolitan Municipality of Istanbul. At another concert in the CRR in 2019, she was remembered with her signature song.

== Legacy ==
A street in the Suadiye neighborhood of Kadıköy district in Istanbul is named in her honor.
