= Niyazi Sayın =

Turkish ney player and music educator (1927–2025)

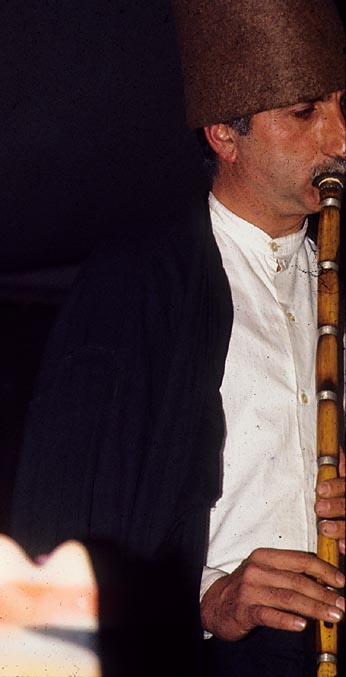
- Sayın in 1970

Background information
- Born: 12 February 1927; Istanbul, Turkey
- Died: 8 October 2025 (aged 98)
- Genres: Turkish classical
- Instrument: ney flute
- Label: (reissues) Kalan

Niyazi Sayın (Turkish pronunciation: [nijaˈzi saˈjɯn]; 12 February 1927 – 8 October 2025) was a Turkish ney player and music educator. His last name Sayın has Turkish origin. For a long time, he performed duets with tanbur lute player Necdet Yaşar. He was regarded as the most important ney player in Turkish classical music.

Sayın died on 8 October 2025, at the age of 98.

== Discography ==
Modern reissues include:

- 2006 – Niyazi Sayın & Necdet Yaşar: Masters of Turkish Music - 2-CD compilation (Kalan Müzik)
