= Saltik =

Saltik or Saltık may refer to:

== People ==
- Hasan Saltık, Turkish record producer, owner of Kalan Müzik
- Sari Saltik (Sarı Saltuk), Muslim Bektashi saint linked in Bulgaria to Kaliakra

== Places ==
- Saltık, Tokat Province, a town in Turkey
- Saltık, Sandıklı district, Afyonkarahisar Province, a town in Turkey
