= List of Turkish ships sunk or damaged during World War II =

Turkey was neutral during World War II. But Turkish cargo ships were frequently sunk or damaged by the warring nations. In the following list those ships which were sunk or damaged during the war by the warring nations are shown.

Date	Name of the ship	Sea	Antagonist	Submarine
23 June 1941	Refah	Mediterranean Sea	Italy	Ondina
3 November 1941	Kaynakdere	Black Sea	Soviet Union	Shch-214
18 November 1941	Yenice	Black Sea	Soviet Union	Shch-215
1 January 1942	Koraltepe	Black Sea	Soviet Union	Shch-214
23 February 1942	Çankaya	Black Sea	Soviet Union	Shch-213
3 March 1942	Adana	Black Sea	Soviet Union	Shch-213
18 May 1942	Duatepe	Black Sea	Soviet Union	Shch-205
18 May 1942	Mahbube-Cihan	Black Sea	Soviet Union	Shch-205
25 May 1942	Şafak	Black Sea	Soviet Union	Shch-205
12 July 1942	Antares	Mediterranean sea	Italy	Alagi
24 February 1942	Struma	Black Sea	Soviet Union	
5 August 1942	Mefkure	Black Sea	Soviet Union	Shch-205
8 December 1942	Beycik	Black Sea	Soviet Union	D-5
22 July 1943	Tayyare Bahri	Black Sea	Soviet Union	L-4
22 August 1943	Derviş	Black Sea	Soviet Union	Shch-209
23 August 1943	Gürpınar	Black Sea	Soviet Union	L-4
25 August 1943	Yılmaz	Black Sea	Soviet Union	Shch-209
20 July 1944	Şemsi Bahri	Black Sea	Soviet Union	Shch-205
26 August 1944	Hüdakerim	Black Sea	Soviet Union	Shch-209

Except for Adana, Duatepe and Antares all of these ships were sunk. Usually the crew were taken prisoner. But the human casualty was heavy in Refah and Mefkure cases. In Refah, 168 people on way for training and in Mefkure 301 Jewish refugees were lost.

On 14 July 1942 Turkish submarine TCG Atılay was sunk as a result of a naval mine explosion in the strait of Dardanelles. 38 sailors were drowned. But the mine was probably a World War I mine.
