= Cemil Özbal =

Turkish musician and doctor (1908 – 1980)

- Born: 1908; Aintab, Ottoman Empire
- Died: 14 March 1980 (aged 71)

Cemil Özbal was a Turkish doctor and tambur player, considered as one of the last examples of significant tambur players of the classical style.

Cemil was born in 1908 in Aintab in the Ottoman Empire to Ayşe and Ökkeş Efendi of the Balhakıkcıoğlu family. He went to Robert College in Istanbul and received medical education there. He married Seher Özbal, who he met during his education. He then returned to his hometown, working in the American hospital as a surgeon between 1946 and 1977. He was regarded as one of the best general surgeons in Gaziantep at the time, later taking charge of the American hospital in the city.

Özbal started playing organ and trumpet at an early age. He received musical education for 6 months from the Armenian Kasbar Khoja and Viktorya in his hometown. In Istanbul, he was taught by various musicians of the time in classical and mevlevi styles. In 1950, he formed the first Turkish classical choire in his hometown.

== Works ==
- The people of Aintab (Turks) (1928)

== Compositions ==
- Acemaşîran İlâhi
- Hüzzam Sazsemâîsi
- Sûzidil Sazsemâîsi
- Hüseynî Sazsemâîsi
