= Erkan Oğur =

Turkish musician (born 1954)

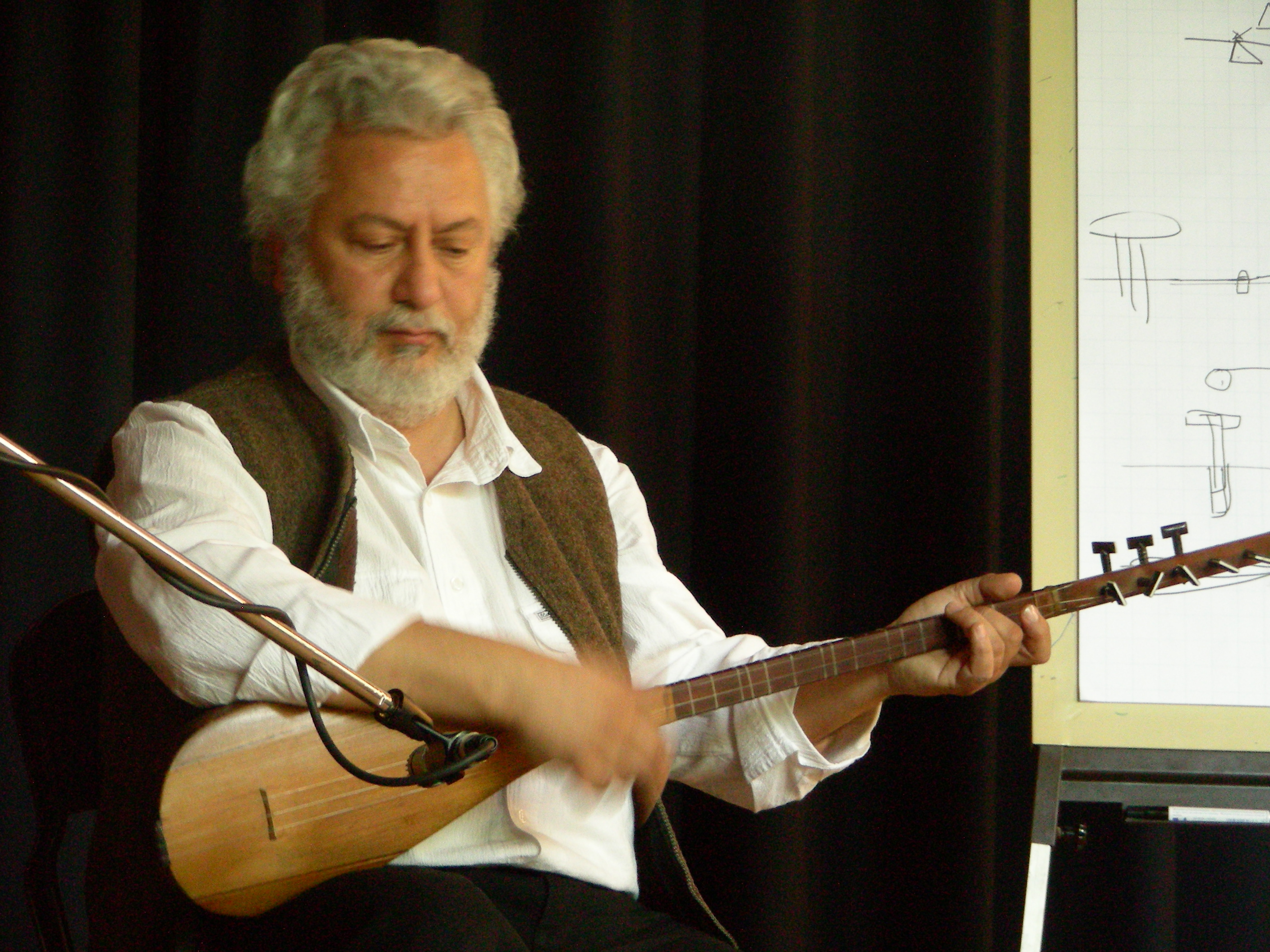
- Oğur in 2007

Background information
- Born: 17 April 1954 (age 72); Ankara, Turkey
- Genres: Turkish folk, blues, jazz
- Occupations: composer, score composer, musician
- Instruments: Fretless guitar, kopuz, bağlama, oud, cümbüş, yaylı tambur, Turkish tambur, violin, kemenche, erhu, bouzouki, bendir, tubular bell, Oğur sazı
- Years active: 1982–present
- Labels: Feuer und Eis, Kalan
- Member of: Telvin

Erkan Oğur (pronounced [æɾˈkan oˈuɾ]) (born 17 April 1954) is a Turkish musician. As pioneer of fretless guitars, he invented the first fretless classical guitar in 1976. As composer, he has influenced many musicians with his compositions combining the sounds of Turkish folk music and classical music with the ancient traditional music. He has played many concerts all over the world. He is regarded as a master of the kopuz and bağlama lutes.

== Biography ==
Oğur was born on 17 April 1954, in Ankara. He spent his childhood in Elazığ, eastern Turkey, where he became interested in violin and the Turkish bağlama lute, and started to practice them frequently. He graduated from high school in Elazığ, then moved to study physics at the Ankara University Faculty of Science from 1970 to 1973. As a result of encouragement to be a scientist by his father, he started to study physics engineering and in 1974 continued his education at LMU Munich in Germany, for three years. Oğur was introduced to guitar education in 1973. Instead of being a scientist, he chose to be a musician. Since he needed detailed sounds from a guitar in order to obtain Turkish melodies, he modified his guitar and invented the fretless classical guitar in 1976.

In 1980, Oğur returned to Turkey, and started to study at the State Conservatory of Istanbul Technical University. After his military service, he worked as an oud lute teacher. He had live performances with Fikret Kızılok and Bülent Ortaçgil where he contributed to scene with fretless guitar. He released his first album in Germany called Arayışlar ("Searches"). In 1989, he went to the U.S. to work with numerous local blues artists, foremost of which was Robert 'One Man' Johnson. He introduced fretless guitar into blues. A year later, he released his first album in Turkey, Bir Ömürlük Misafir ("A Lifetime Guest"), which was ranked 4th in European lists. He still performs concerts through the world and in Turkey. Oğur works with Kemal Eroglu on technical improvements on bağlama lute; and continues his performances with Fahir Atakoglu and Bülent Ortaçgil. In 2004, he played on Yansımalar's album Pervane ("Moth"). He is a member of the Telvin trio, which mainly performs Turkish folk music in improvised jazz style, with İlkin Deniz and Turgut Alp Bekoglu, and has released an album called Telvin in 2006.

Oğur's soundtrack for the 2004 movie Yazı Tura by Uğur Yücel won two awards: the 2004 Golden Orange for Best Music at the Antalya Golden Orange Film Festival, and the 2005 award for Best Music at the Ankara International Film Festival.

== Discography ==
Chronologically, subsections by the date of their first item:

Early works and collaborations

- 1982 - Istanbul'da Bir Amerikalı
- 1983 - Perdesiz Gitarda Arayışlar - small-distribution cassette

Soundtrack albums and collaborations (by film date)

- 1989 - Sis OST - Zülfü Livaneli film soundtrack
- 1996 - Eşkiya OST (The Bandit) - with Aşkın Arsunan, Yavuz Turgul film Eşkıya soundtrack (Kalan, released 2000)
- 2003 - Yazı Tura OST - Uğur Yücel film soundtrack, (Kalan, released 2005)
- 2009 - Mommo (Kız Kardeşim) - Atalay Tasdiken film soundtrack

Solo and collaboration albums

- 1993 - Fretless (Feuer und Eis)
- 1996 - Bir Ömürlük Misafir - reworked reissue of Fretless (Kalan)
- 1998 - Gülün Kokusu Vardı - with İsmail Hakkı Demircioğlu (Kalan)
- 1999 - Hiç ("Nothing") - with Okan Murat Öztürk (Kalan)
- 2000 - Anadolu Beşik - with İsmail Hakkı Demircioğlu (Kalan)
- 2001 - Fuad - with Djivan Gasparyan
- 2006 - Telvin - in Telvin trio
- 2007 - The Istanbul Connection
- 2012 - Dönmez Yol
- 2014 - Dokunmak - with Derya Türkan, İlkin Deniz

Featured on albums

- 1989 - Mideast/Midwest - recording of live performance with Robert 'One-Man' Johnson
- 1995 - The Other Side of Turkey - compilation, includes Oğur (Feuer und Eis)
- 2004 - Pervane ("Moth") by Yansımalar - studio album, Oğur on four tracks (Kalan)
- 2009 - Kıyıların Ardı by Fatih Yaşar - Oğur plays on "Sirlarumi Söyledum"
- 2011 - Bahçeye Hanımeli by Ayşenur Kolivar - Oğur plays on the title track, "Bahçeye Hanımeli"
- 2013 - Sabah Rüzgarı by Hüseyin and Ali Rıza Albayrak - Oğur plays on "Böyle Buyurdu Aşık"
- 2017 - Encounters by Katre - Oğur plays on the title track, "Existence I. Underwater World"

Awards
Preceded by Timur Selçuk	Golden Orange Award for Best Music Score; 2004 for Yazı Tura	Succeeded by Tamer Çıray
