= Hampartsoum Limondjian =

Composer of Turkish Classical and Armenian Church music

Hampartsoum Limondjian Համբարձում Լիմոնճեան
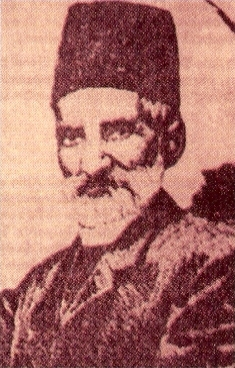

Background information
- Born: 1768; Constantinople, Ottoman Empire
- Died: 29 June 1839 (aged 70–71) Constantinople, Ottoman Empire
- Genres: Armenian church music, Armenian classical music, Ottoman classical music, musical notation
- Occupations: Musical theorist, composer, singer
- Instruments: singing, violin, tanbur

Hampartsoum Limondjian (Note: Rendered as Hamparsum Limonciyan in Turkish Latin-script alphabet; also Hambardzum Limondjian.) (Armenian: Համբարձում Լիմոնճեան; (Note: In classical orthography and Western Armenian; Համբարձում Լիմոնջյան in reformed Eastern Armenian.) 1768 – 29 June 1839) was an Ottoman Armenian composer of Armenian church, inclined to composition of classical music and Ottoman classical music. He was a musical theorist who developed the "Hamparsum" notation system used as the main music notation for Western Armenian and Ottoman classical music until the 20th-century introduction of European notation systems, and is still in use by the Armenian Apostolic Church.

Limondjian was referred to as Baba Hamparsum (Father Hampartsoum) in Ottoman imperial court music circles. The name Համբարձում, transliterated as Hampartsoum in Western Armenian or Hambardzum in Eastern Armenian, means "ascension".

== Biography ==
=== Early life ===
Hampartsoum Limondjian was born in 1768 on Çukur Street in the Pera (Beyoğlu) district of Istanbul. His father Sarkis and his mother Gaderina, who had recently moved to Istanbul from Harput, were poor, and could only send their son to primary school. After primary school, Limondjian started working for a tailor. His love for music was eminent, and as a kid, Limondjian started attending Armenian churches where he received his music lessons for free.

=== Marriage and children ===
Hampartsoum Limondjian married at the age of 27 and had six children. One of them, named Zenop Limondjian (1810–1866) also became a musician and played the ney.

=== Musician, composer, member of court, and theoretician ===
Hampartsoum Limondjian took lessons in Armenian music from various Armenian musicians like Krikor Karasakalyan (1736–1808) and Zenne Bogos (1746–1826). He soon came under the patronage of another Armenian - Hovhannes Çelebi Düzyan, director of the Ottoman Imperial Mint. This is when he devoted himself fully to music and continued his music education in the Düzyan family mansion located at the Kuruçeşme district of Constantinople. After serving as a chorist in the Armenian Church, he was appointed as the precentor (first singer) and chief musician.

Around this time, Hampartsoum Limondjian started attending mevlevihanes, places of gathering for dervishes of the Mevlevi order, to learn Ottoman music. In the Beşiktaş Mevlevihanesi, he took lessons from Dede Efendi, one of the greatest Ottoman composers. He was then accepted at the court of Ottoman Sultan Selim III, himself a composer whose music is still performed today, and was a regular member of the music circles of his day.

Sultan Selim III was concerned about the lack of a comprehensive notation system for music and encouraged members of his court to work on a notation system that would be easy to learn and transcribe. As a result, two music systems were developed and presented to Selim III, by Hampartsoum Limondjian and Abdulbaki Nasir Dede. Abdulbaki Nasir Dede's system was based on the abjad system, however differs in the ordering of the notes. Hampartsoum Limondjian's notation that he developed in two years between 1813 and 1815 was preferred over the other and became the dominant notation for Turkish and Armenian music.

He worked as a master of music and educated a number of Turkish and Armenian musicians of his day. Besides being known as a leading composer, he was a famous vocal performer and played the violin and the tanbur. Thirty-one of his Armenian hymns, composed with Armenian lyrics in the Turkish melodic system (makam) survive up to this day. He has composed a large number of Turkish music pieces, most of which are regularly performed today.

==== Hamparsum notation ====
Using his own system, Hampartsoum Limondjian transcribed most of 18th century Turkish music compositions in a collection of six books, which he presented to Selim III. Only two of the originals survive to date and are preserved at the Istanbul Municipal Conservatory Library. As the dominant notation for Turkish and Armenian music, the Hamparsum notation was instrumental in the transcription and survival of thousands of pieces of music, and was surpassed only in modern times in its use for Turkish classical music. The notation system is still in use by the Armenian Apostolic Church.

The Hampartsoum notation uses symbols derived from an older notation called khaz (Armenian: խազ) used by the Armenian Church. Pitch is indicated by one of forty-five symbols. There are fourteen notes per octave over a range of three octaves and a minor second; a tilde is used in place of a sharp and also to raise or lower a note an octave. All twelve notes of the Western chromatic scale are represented, but in the case of F-sharp (fa diyez in Turkish) and B-natural (si), two enharmonic symbols are used for each, because Middle Eastern music uses microtonal intervals called commas. Above each note is written another symbol, marking its duration. Other symbols are used for rests, repeats and phrases.

=== Death ===
Hampartsoum Limondjian died at the age of 71 in his house in the Hasköy district of Constantinople. He is buried in the Surp Agop Armenian Cemetery.
