= TCG Atılay =

TCG Atılay is the name of the following submarines of the Turkish Navy:

- TCG Atılay (1938), sunk by a mine, 14 July 1942
- TCG Atılay (S-347), a Type 209 submarine in commission 1976–2016
- TCG Atılay (MİLDEN), an Atılay-class submarine laid down in 2025 for commissioning in the 2030s
