= Tamburi Ali Efendi =

- Born: Ali; 1836; Midilli, Ottoman Empire
- Died: 1902 (aged 65–66) İzmir, Ottoman Empire
- Genres: Turkish Classical Music
- Instrument: tambur

Tamburi Ali Efendi (also spelled Tanburi or Tambouri; 1836–1902) was a tambur virtuoso and composer, one of the most famous among 19th-century composers, who was also notable for having greatly contributed to Tamburi Cemil Bey's development in music. He was from the Ottoman Empire.

== Biography ==
Ali Efendi was born in Midilli (now Mytilene) in 1836. His education, both in Mytilene and, after 1854, in Istanbul, was religious. He was soon remarked thanks to the beauty of his voice and his virtuosity in playing the tanbur and, upon the sultan Abdülaziz's personal instructions, was taken in employment in the palace, where he spent 23 years of his career. It was during this period that he met Tanburi Cemil Bey, then an adolescent, and became his tanbur teacher. He quit the palace in 1885 and started living in İzmir. He died there in 1902 after having greatly contributed to the city's musical scene.

He is considered one of the most lyric composers in Turkish classical music.
