= Safiye Ayla =

Turkish singer (1907–1998)

- Born: 14 July 1907; Istanbul, Ottoman Empire
- Died: 14 January 1998 (aged 90) Istanbul, Turkey
- Genre: Turkish classical
- Occupation: Singer

Safiye Ayla (14 July 1907 – 14 January 1998) was one of the most famous singers of Turkish classical music.

== Early life ==
She was born on 14 July 1907 in Istanbul. Her father, Mısırlı Hicazîzade Hafız Abdullah Bey of Egypt, died before her birth. Her mother, who was a servant at the Imperial Court, died when she was only three years old. She was sent to the orphanage "Çağlayan Darüleytâmı" in Bebek, where she completed her primary education. Safiye Ayla was then educated at the teacher college in Bursa. She served a brief time as a teacher, however did not continue in her profession.

She began her musical education as a piano student. She studied under Mustafa Sunar, and began to sing as a soloist at some of the most important casinos of her time.

== Career ==
Safiye Ayla worked with some of the most important artists of her time, including Yesari Asım Arsoy, Hafız Ahmet Irsoy, Selahattin Pınar, Sadettin Kaynak and Udi Nevres Bey. She performed for Mustafa Kemal Atatürk in 1932 and became one of his favorite singers.

In 1950, she married the artist Şerif Muhiddin Targan (1892-1967). Countless of her concerts were broadcast on Turkish radio, and she made more than 500 recordings.

Safiye Ayla became the most famous and successful singer of her time by virtue of her singing style, which was somewhat influenced by western styles. She could reach the highest pitches and paid special attention to pronunciation. Her repertoire included classical, modern, and popular music, so she was able to reach a broad public.

By writing "Seninle doğan gündür bu gönül" and "Aşk yaprağına konarak koza öresim gelir", she showed her own songwriting talent. In 1942, she played Queen Mimoza onstage in the play Alabanda.

Safiye Ayla is considered, along with Müzeyyen Senar and Hamiyet Yüceses, to be the "Üç Dev Çınar" (three great sycamores).

She lived in Istanbul until her death on 14 January 1998. She was laid to rest at Zincirlikuyu Cemetery.

== Legacy ==
A song competition was established in honor of her to promote talented young people.
