= Sayin =

Sayin may refer to

- Sayin', eye dialect for "saying"
- Sayin, a god worshipped in pre-Islamic Arabia
- Sayin Khan, a Turkmen confederation
- Sayın, a Turkish last name
- Aidan Sayin (born 2000s), American football player
- Julian Sayin (born 2005), American football player
