= List of Laz singers =

This is a list of Laz singers. The list includes musical artists from the Black Sea region who perform traditional Laz music.

== D ==
- Resul Dindar

== K ==
- Volkan Konak
- Kazim Koyuncu

== S ==
- Fuat Saka

== T ==
- Birol Topaloğlu
- Lela Tsurtsumia

== See also ==
- Music of Turkey
