= Yansımalar =

Turkish world music group

- Origin: Turkey
- Genres: world, Turkish fusion, Anatolian folk
- Years active: 1990–present
- Label: Kalan
- Members: Birol Yayla; A. Şenol Filiz; Engin Gürkey; Nezih Yeşilnil
- Website: Yansimalar.com

Yansımalar (Turkish pronunciation: [jansɯmaɫaɾ], meaning "reflections"), or Yansimalar in the West, is a Turkish group that compose and play contemporary ethnic music, classified as world music in the Western world. It is sometimes listed as Grup Yansımalar (formal Turkish prefix for bands).

It was founded in 1990 by Birol Yayla (guitarist, tanbur lutist) and Aziz Şenol Filiz (ney flutist). Their 2004 album Pervane ("Moth") was a noted world music album in Europe. They contributed the music for several Turkish movies, and are featured on the soundtrack of the film The Last Ottoman: Yandim Ali (2007).

== Overview ==
In 1980, Birol Yayla and Aziz Şenol Filiz met at the conservatoire. In 1983, they joined the Turkish music chorus. In 1990, they formed Yansımalar: the name is the plural of the Turkish word yansıma (reflection), giving yansımalar (reflections), which as in English means both the reflection of the mirror and the reflection of the mind. Their music, mostly composed by Birol Yayla, is essentially instrumental, though a few pieces feature the sound of voice or breathing.

About their music, Mario Levi (the Turkish novelist from Izmir) wrote in his introduction to Pervane, "Some songs speak to you without words. Because those songs have a language. A language with its source in your personal history, or in collective memory. Some songs seem to caress you, and some, in the middle of the night, jar you to your depths. It's a bit as if these songs, with the passing of time, write their stories into you. From the first time I listened to the songs of 'Yansımalar', I have always had this feeling, and for me, this story continues in 'Pervane'. [...]".

In 1991 and 1995, the founding pair recorded two albums, released by the newly created record label Kalan Müzik (1991). In 1996, the band was joined by Engin Gürkey (percussions) and Nezih Yeşilnil (double bass), who appear on the 3rd and following albums. In 2001, four guest musicians participated to the recording of the 4th album, and in 2004, eight guests are featured on the 5th album, including noted fretless guitarist Erkan Oğur.

They contributed music (along with Baba Zula) to the soundtrack for Derviş Zaim's first film, Tabutta Rövaşata (1996). And the music for Altın Kanatlar (2002, TV documentary), Ferhat'la Şirin (2002, movie), Esir Şehrin İnsanları (2003, TV miniseries featuring Oktay Kaynarca and Zeynep Tokuş). They were regular guests of music shows on BRT in 1999-2000 and on TRT in 2002–2003.

In 2007, they contributed music to the soundtrack of The Last Ottoman: Yandim Ali (Son Osmanlı: Yandım Ali), a noted Turkish film, based on a comic book by Suat Yalaz. Yansımalar (Birol Yayla) composed the music for 2 tracks, and the band contributed strings to about half of the tracks. The music was produced by Prince Claus Award laureate Hasan Saltık, founder of the Kalan record label.

== Members ==
=== Current members (as of 2007) ===
- Birol Yayla (founder 1990) – acoustic guitar (AD Series Aria), classical guitar, Turkish tanbur lute, fretless lute, composer
- A. Şenol Filiz (founder 1990) – ney reed flute, bendir frame drum
- Engin Gürkey (since 1996) – percussions (daf tambourine, etc.)
- Nezih Yeşilnil (since 1996) – double bass

=== Guest musicians (albums from 1991 to 2004) ===
Alphabetically: Suren Asaduryan (2001: duduk double reed flute), Reyent Bölükbaşı (2001: cello), Pınar Duruk (2004: cello), Samim Karaca (2001, 2004: oud lute), Mehmet Kemiksiz (2004: voice), Ümit Kuzer (2004: sound pad), Erkan Oğur (2004: fretless classical guitar, kopuz lute), Taner Sayacıoğlu (2001, 2004: kanun zither), Fahrettin Yarkın (2004: bendir frame drum), Ferruh Yarkın (2004: dayereh frame drum).

== Discography ==
=== Studio albums ===
- 1991 - Yansımalar (Yansimalar)
- 1995 - Bab-ı Esrar (Bab-i Esrar)
- 2000 - Serzeniş (Serzenis, Serzenish)
- 2001 - Vuslat
- 2004 - Pervane ("Moth")
- 2013 - Mektup

=== Featured on ===
- 2007 - The Last Ottoman: Yandim Ali - soundtrack

=== Compilations ===
- Yansımalar, Aziz Şenol Filiz, Birol Yayla – Best of
