= Meshk system =

Meshk system (Turkish: Meşk sistemi) is a musical education system that was developed by Turkish musicians.

The Meshk system is based on

- absence of any musical notes,
- practicing by repetition and memory,
- in a master-apprentice framework,
- observation and imitation of the master,
- personal and direct encouragement and/or corrective feed-back by the master.

The Meshk system was useful for the period in which musical notes were not utilized in Turkish music and helped convey several thousands of works and musical styles for several centuries.

As a musical education system, meshk system allows instrumentalists and singers respect the original style of the music while adding their individual interpretations.

Classical Turkish music is based on nuances in terms of its application. For this reason, when the music is being converted to the musical notes it becomes concrete. This concreteness limits the extension of the individual interpretations of the original work. Along with its inconveniences, meşk is an educational system which makes individual interpretations of the music loyal to the original.
