= Oğur sazı =

The oğur sazı is a six-stringed kopuz invented by Erkan Oğur. It has different tuning system than other bağlama's.
