= Cinuçen Tanrıkorur =

Background information
- Born: February 20, 1938
- Origin: Istanbul, Turkey
- Died: June 28, 2000 (aged 62)
- Genres: Turkish classical
- Instrument: Oud

Cinuçen Tanrıkorur was an oud master, prolific composer of Turkish classical music, musicologist, and music journalist. He served as the director of Turkish Music at Ankara Radio, and taught music at Selçuk University.

He was born in Istanbul. He was first exposed to music through his uncle Mecdinevin Tanrıkorur who was a student of Münir Nurettin Selçuk. He was introduced to the oud through his mother, and started composing at the age of 14. At the age of 22 he became a musician at the Istanbul Radio. He is a graduate of the Liceo Italiano Statale Istanbul, and later studied architecture in Istanbul, and then moved to Ankara where he worked for the government as an architect. He wrote a method for the oud, which was awarded a prize by Turkish Radio and Television Corporation. He was later the director of the traditional music section at Ankara Radio for several years. He composed over 500 pieces of both instrumental and vocal music, and is regarded as one of the greatest contemporary Turkish composers in the classical tradition. He also created a new mode, Makam Şedd-i sabâ, which he demonstrated in a classical suite (fasıl) of six pieces.
