= Hasan Saltık =

Turkish record producer (1964–2021)

- Born: 1964; Hozat, Turkey
- Died: 2 June 2021 (aged 56–57) Bodrum, Turkey
- Genres: Turkish folk, Kurdish folk, Ottoman classical
- Occupation: Record producer
- Years active: 1991–2021
- Label: Kalan Müzik
- Website: Kalan.com (English)

Hasan Saltık (pronounced [hasan saɫtɯk]; 1964 – 2 June 2021) was a Turkish record producer. He was the 1991 founder of Kalan Müzik, a Turkish independent record label company based in Istanbul specialized in releasing Saltık's recordings of traditional ethnic and folk music from Turkey and vicinity, sometimes against governmental opposition.

In 2003, Saltık's work through Kalan made him a laureate of the international Prince Claus Awards on the theme "The survival and innovation of Crafts" for having "played a central role in the rescue, rediscovery and documentation of the cultural diversity of Turkish music". In 2004, he was called "The Anthropologist of Folk Music" by Time magazine.

== Biography ==
=== Life ===
In 1964, Hasan Saltık was born in Hozat, Tunceli, a small town in eastern Turkey to a Turkmen father and a Kurdish-Zaza mother. At age 11, he moved with his family to Istanbul. He went to music school but had to drop out in order to take jobs, and at age 19, he went to sea. At age 24, he came back to Istanbul and worked in his uncle's music shop. In 1991 (aged 27), he founded Kalan Müzik, and has operated it since.

=== Works ===
In 1991 (aged 27), he became a record producer and founded the independent record label Kalan Müzik, named after his natal town's pre-1936 name. Since then, he has been scouring Turkey and neighbouring regions to record traditional ethnic and folk music and release it on his label, along with reissues of classic 78 rpm records of Turkish and Ottoman music. He also published modern acts, such as the controversial Grup Yorum, or the popular Yansımalar.

In 2003 (aged 39), Saltık's work through Kalan made him a laureate of Netherlands's international Prince Claus Awards on the theme "The survival and innovation of Crafts" for having "played a central role in the rescue, rediscovery and documentation of the cultural diversity of Turkish music". The jury concluded, "Saltik founded a small company to produce recordings of the highest quality which have been the catalyst for the revival of musical traditions and led to their dissemination worldwide. He has conserved and promoted the musical heritage of the area th[r]ough establishing a label which produces unparalleled recordings."

Saltık was also a member of the board of the MESAM (Türkiye Musiki Eseri Sahipleri Meslek Birliği, the Musical Work Owners' Society of Turkey). In September 2004, Time magazine made a feature article about Saltık, "a rebel at heart", and his career, calling him "The Anthropologist of Folk Music".

=== Activism ===
Because laws passed after the 1980 Turkish coup d'état banned songs in minority languages, especially in Kurdish (deeming them separatist), Saltık's work has been political as well as musical. He has been an activist for the right to disseminate minority musical genres, explaining, "Minorities are our biggest cultural asset; we should be protecting them and promoting them. […] I see it as my duty."

- In 1992, a release of Kurdish music sent Saltık to court, facing a three-year jail term; he escaped sentencing only because the prosecutor was a follower of his work.
- In 1999, he was sentenced to one year of prison for "making propaganda for an illegal organization", but the sentence was later overturned by the Court of Cassation.
- In 2001, the Turkish Ministry for Industry and Trade tried to close his record company for distributing products as protests against the F-type prisons.
- In 2002, his music-publishing license was confiscated by the courts after he issued an old folk song that featured the word "Kurdistan", which is taboo in Turkey. The sentence was reversed following an outcry. "It was ironic", says Saltık. "French, German or English songs were O.K., but music in our languages was banned."

As of 2004, the governmental change after the 2002 elections and the evolution of Turkey towards being a part of the European Union had led to a normalization of relations between Saltık and officials, such as the Turkish Culture Ministry handing out Kalan CDs to visiting dignitaries. This didn't entirely stop some indirect prosecutions:

- In February 2005, a court ordered the confiscation of the Kurdish album Keçe Kurdan by Aynur Dogan, produced by Kalan; the confiscation was eventually lifted in November 2005.
