= Kar (Turkish music) =

The kar is a vocal genre in Ottoman classical music. It was a movement of the fasıl, or suite.
