= Mesut Cemil =

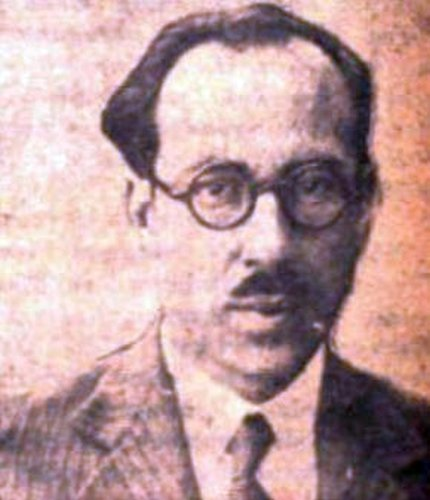

Background information
- Born: 1902; Ottoman Empire
- Died: 1963 (aged 60–61) Turkey
- Genres: Ottoman classical, Turkish makam
- Occupation: Composer
- Instruments: Tanbur, cello, violin

Mesut Cemil (pronounced [mesut dʒemil]; 1902 – October 31, 1963) was a Turkish composer, and a notable tanbur lute and cello player. His father was Tanburi Cemil Bey.

He participated in the 1932 Cairo Congress of Arab Music.

Cemil took cello and violin lessons and attended Berlin Music Academy as a student of cello. In 1927 he began to work at the Istanbul Radio, eventually becoming director of the station. Cemil was assigned to most of the positions in the Radio, including announcer, producer and head of music broadcasts, as well as working as a tanbur performer. Cemil formed the Classical Choir at the Ankara Radio. He retired in 1960, but continued conducting choirs at the Istanbul Radio.

== See also ==
- List of composers of classical Turkish music
