= Birol Topaloğlu =

Turkish musician (born 1965)

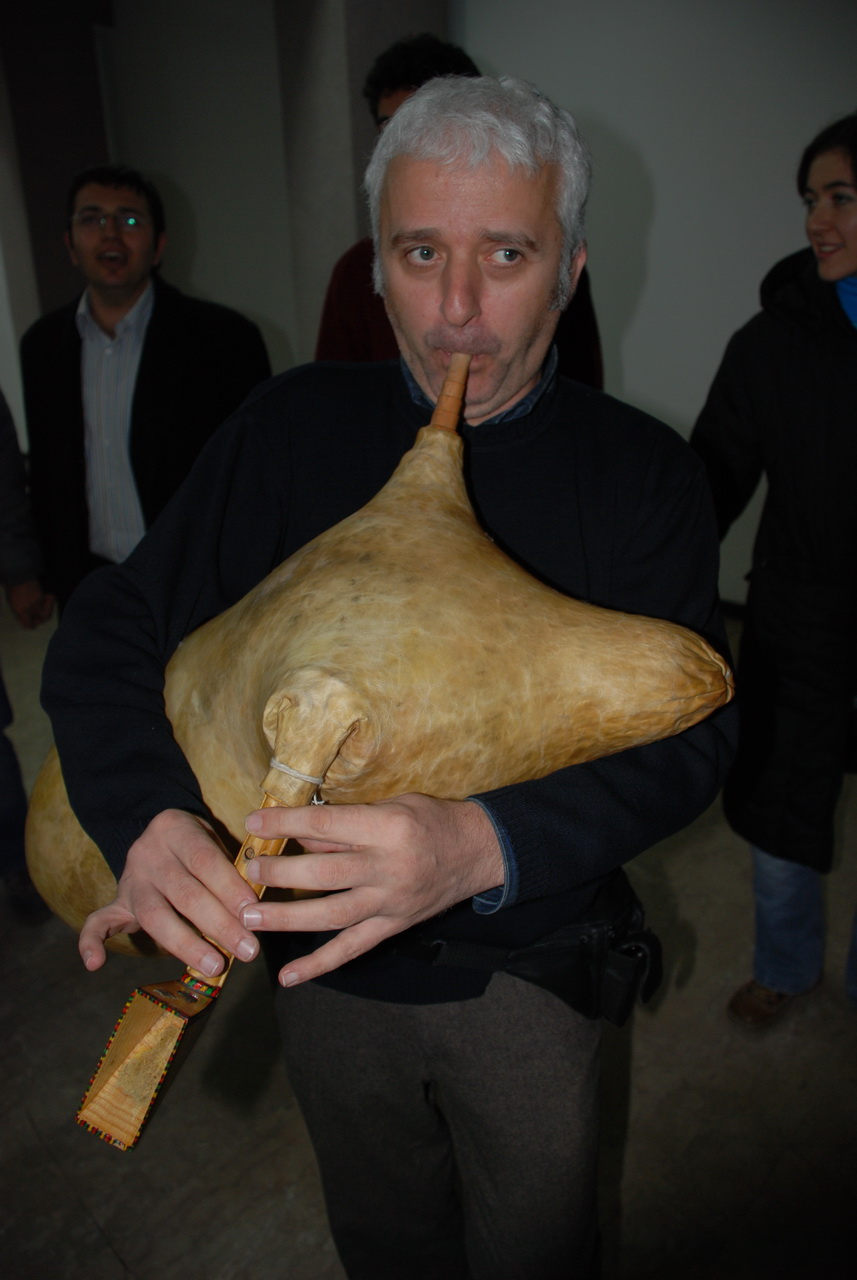
- Laz musician Birol Topaloglu plays 'tulum'

Background information
- Born: 1965 (age 60–61)
- Origin: Rize, Turkey
- Genres: Folk, karadeniz music
- Occupations: Singer, musician
- Instruments: tulum, kemenche, bağlama
- Labels: Kalan Müzik

Birol Topaloğlu (b.1965, Pazar, Rize) is a Turkish folk musician and activist of Laz ancestry.

== Discography ==
- Heyamo (1997)
- Aravani (2000)
- Lazeburi (2001)
- Lazeburi, No.2 (2001)
- Collaborations In Traditional Laz Music (2005)
- Ezmoce (2007)
- Destani (2007)
- Kıyı Boyu Karadeniz (2011)

== Bibliography ==
- Eliot Bates: Social Interactions, Musical Arrangement, and the Production of Digital Audio in Istanbul Recording Studios. Dissertation. University of California at Berkeley 2008, S. 78f (bei google books)
