= Fretless guitar =

Type of guitar

String instrument
- Classification: String instrument
- Hornbostel–Sachs classification: 321.322 (Composite chordophone)

Playing range
- (a standard tuned guitar)

Related instruments
- plucked string instruments; Electric guitar; Bass guitar; Fretless bass; Oud

A fretless guitar is a guitar with a fingerboard without frets, typically a standard instrument that has had the frets removed, though some custom-built and commercial fretless guitars are occasionally made. The classic fretless guitar was first pioneered in 1976 by Turkish musician Erkan Oğur. Fretless bass guitars are readily available, with most major guitar manufacturers producing fretless models.

On the fretless guitar, the performer's fingers press the string directly against the fingerboard, as with a violin, resulting in a vibrating string that extends from the bridge (where the strings are attached) to the fingertip instead of to a fret.

== Technique ==
Musicians employ a standard harmony and the twelve-tone technique as a base for exploring tones, using a fretless guitar. Fretless guitars offer musicians an ability to use just intonation in any key and mode and explore new sounds through using microtonal harmonies and folk melodies in a jazz-groove context. A detailed article on extended techniques for fretless electric guitar written by British guitarist Rich Perks and was published by Music and Practice journal in 2019.

Musicianship with fretless guitars differ from fretted guitars:

- They require greater finger position precision, because the position of the node of the string is continuously variable (being established by the position of the finger) rather than fixed (established by the position of a fret). As a consequence of this, chordal playing in particular is more difficult to achieve accurately.
- The string resonance is reduced, requiring more forceful plucking or modified amplification (pickups) to achieve desired volume.
- The smooth surface of the fingerboard allows legato playing, with smooth transitional slurs between notes

Fretless guitars are uncommon in most forms of western music and generally limited to the electrified instruments, due to their decreased acoustic volume and sustain. The fretless bass guitar has found popularity in many forms of western music, from pop to jazz. The first use of fretless bass guitars dates back to Bill Wyman in the early 1960s.

Festivals featuring live fretless guitar music have been held for several years both in the US and in Europe. In New York, the first NYC Fretless Guitar Festival was held in 2005. In the Netherlands, the Dutch Fretless Guitar Festival has taken place since 2006.

== See also ==
- Fretless bass
