= Sayın =

Sayın is a Turkish surname. Notable people with the surname include:

- Cansu Nimet Sayın (born 2003), Turkish female hurdler
- Emel Sayın (born 1945), Turkish singer and actress
- Hulusi Sayın (1926–1991), Turkish Gendarmerie general
- Nevzat Sayın (born 1954), Turkish architect
- Niyazi Sayın (1927–2025), Turkish ney flautist and music educator
- Ümit Sayın (born 1970), Turkish pop singer, composer and songwriter
