= Beşiktaş Mevlevihanesi =

Coordinates: 41.0556°N 28.9375°E

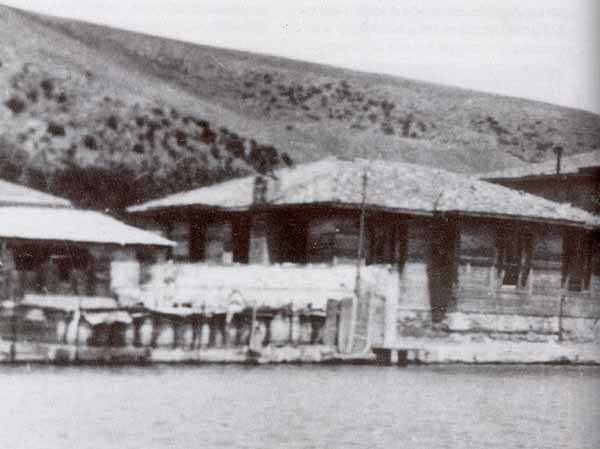
Bahariye

Bahariye Mevlevihanesi (Beşiktaş Mevlevi house - Bahariye Mevlevi lodge) was the third establishment after Galata and Yenikapı Mevlevi houses and established in 1613 by the Ottoman Grand Vizier Ohrili Hüseyin Pasha in Beşiktaş, Istanbul.

The Beşiktaş Mevlevihane was a building that suffered a number of misfortunes; first of all it was demolished to make way for the Çırağan Palace and rebuilt next to the graveyard in Maçka. It was again demolished to make way for the new barracks being built on the orders of Sultan Abdülaziz, and rebuilt yet again on a site beside the Golden Horn in the Bahariye neighbourhood, which is on the road leading from Eyüp to Alibeyköy, thus gaining a new lease of life. The Bahariye Mevlevihane, which consisted of a number of timber buildings resembling mansions, added a further dimension of beauty to this part of the Golden Horn. However, after the closure of the dervish convents these buildings were either destroyed by fire or demolished and nothing survives to indicate where it once stood.
