= Turkish tambur =

Musical instrument

Tambur
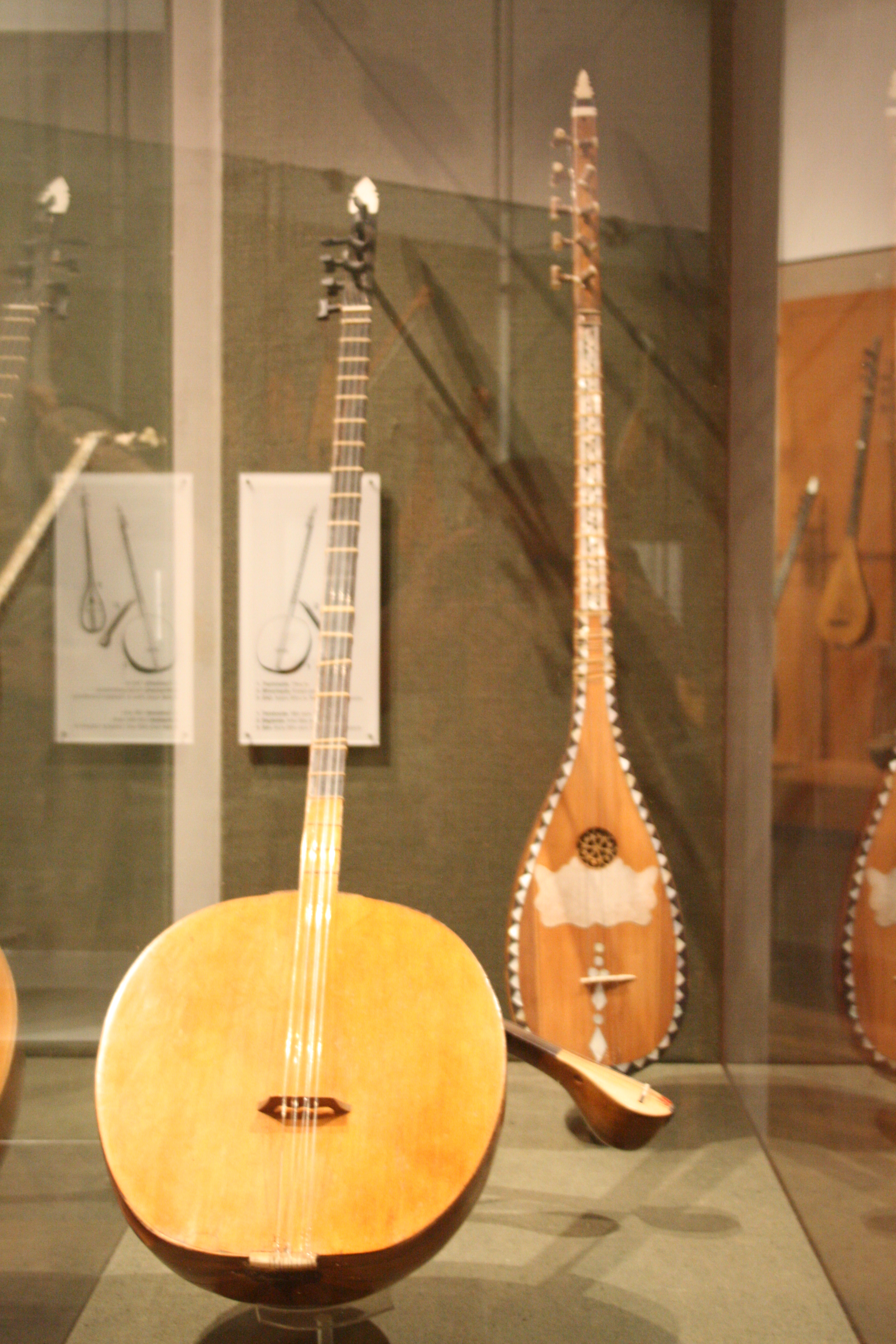
- Turkish tambur on the left

String instrument
- Other names: Turkish: tambur Ottoman Turkish: tambur
- Classification: String instrument

Playing range
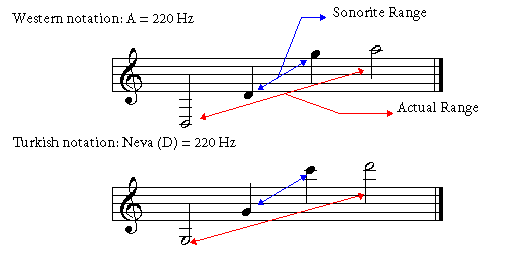

Related instruments
- Tambouras; Tanbur; Bağlama; Saz; Yaylı tambur; Tamburica

Musicians
- Cemil Bey; Tanburi Büyük Osman Bey; İzak Efendi; Tamburi Ali Efendi; Cemil Özbal; Necdet Yaşar; Abdi Coşkun; Sadun Aksüt; Ercüment Batanay; İzzettin Ökte; Refik Fersan; Mesut Cemil; Birol Yayla

Builders
- Zeynel Abidin Cümbüş

The tambur is a fretted string instrument of Turkey and the former lands of the Ottoman Empire. There are two variants, one of which is played with a plectrum (mızraplı tambur) and the other with a bow (yaylı tambur). The player is called a tamburî.

== History and development ==
There are several hypotheses as to the origin of the instrument. One suggests that it descended from the kopuz, a string instrument still in use among the Turkic peoples of Central Asia and the Caspian region. The name itself derives from the tanbur (tunbur), which in turn might have descended from the Sumerian pantur. The name (and its variants such as tambouras, dombura) also denotes a wide spectrum of pear-shaped string instruments in Persia and Central Asia yet these share only their names with the Ottoman court instrument and in fact are more akin to bağlamas or sazes.

By the 15th century, the tambur had assumed the modern shape, being described by Tinctoris in 1480 as being like "a large spoon with three strings." By 1740, when Jean-Étienne Liotard painted his painting, the instrument in his painting has pegs for 8 strings, which are strung in four courses.

The modern instrument also has four pairs or courses of strings.

=== Byzantine origin theory ===
There is a possibility that the version played in the former Byzantine Empire was adopted by the Ottoman Turks. Following this theory, the tambur was adopted and developed by the Ottomans who took over lands formerly part of the Byzantine Empire, the instrument becoming a central instrument in the classical music of the imperial court. In Greece, however, the instrument gradually faded from use and was largely forgotten, in contrast to Turkey, where it continued to evolve and remains in use today.

== Description of the instrument ==
Tamburs are made almost entirely of wood. The shell (Tekne) is assembled from strips of hardwood called ribs joined edge to edge to form a semi-spherical body for the instrument. The number of ribs traditionally amounts to 17, 21 or 23, yet examples with slightly wider and consequently fewer ribs (7, 9 or 11) can also be found among older specimens. Traditionally, thinner strips called fileto are inserted between the ribs for ornamental purposes, but are not obligatory. The most common tonewood veneers used for rib-making are mahogany, flame maple, Persian walnut, Mecca balsam wood (Commiphora gileadensis), Spanish chestnut, Greek juniper, mulberry, Oriental plane, Indian rosewood and apricot. Ribs are assembled on the bottom wedge (tail) and the heel on which the fingerboard is mounted.

The soundboard (Göğüs) is a rotund thin (2.5–3 mm) flat three-, two- or single-piece plate of resonant wood (usually Nordmann, silver or Greek fir). This circular plate measuring about 30 to 35 cm in diameter is mounted on the bottom wedge and the heel with simmering glue and encircled with a wooden ring. A soundhole is either wanting or consists of a very small unornamented opening (mostly in historical specimens), giving the instrument its peculiar sonority.

The neck (Sap) is a mince (only 4-4.5 cm in diameter) 100–110 cm long D-section fingerboard made of light wood and carries catgut frets adjusted to give 36 intervals in an octave. Catgut frets are fixed on the neck by means of minute nails. The main bridge is trapezoidal and mobile, and since the shell lacks braces to support the soundboard, the latter slightly yields in under the bridge. The smaller upper bridge between the pegbox and the neck is traditionally made of bone.

The plectrum is made of tortoiseshell and is called "bağa" (meaning turtle). Cut in an asymmetrical V-form and polished at 45° on the tip, it measures 2-2.5 mm × 5–6 mm × 10–15 cm.

Nowadays the tambur has seven strings. In the past tamburs with eight strings were not uncommon.

=== A Variant: The Yaylı Tambur ===
The yaylı tambur has a similar physical appearance, although the shell -a nearly perfect semi-sphere- might be made of metal. It is played with a bow instead of a plectrum. The technique was introduced by Cemil Bey in the end of the 19th century. Ercüment Batanay was, after Cemil Bey, the most outstanding virtuoso of this instrument, until his death. The yaylı tambur is held vertically on the knees, as opposed to the regular one where the neck is maintained horizontal to the ground at all times.

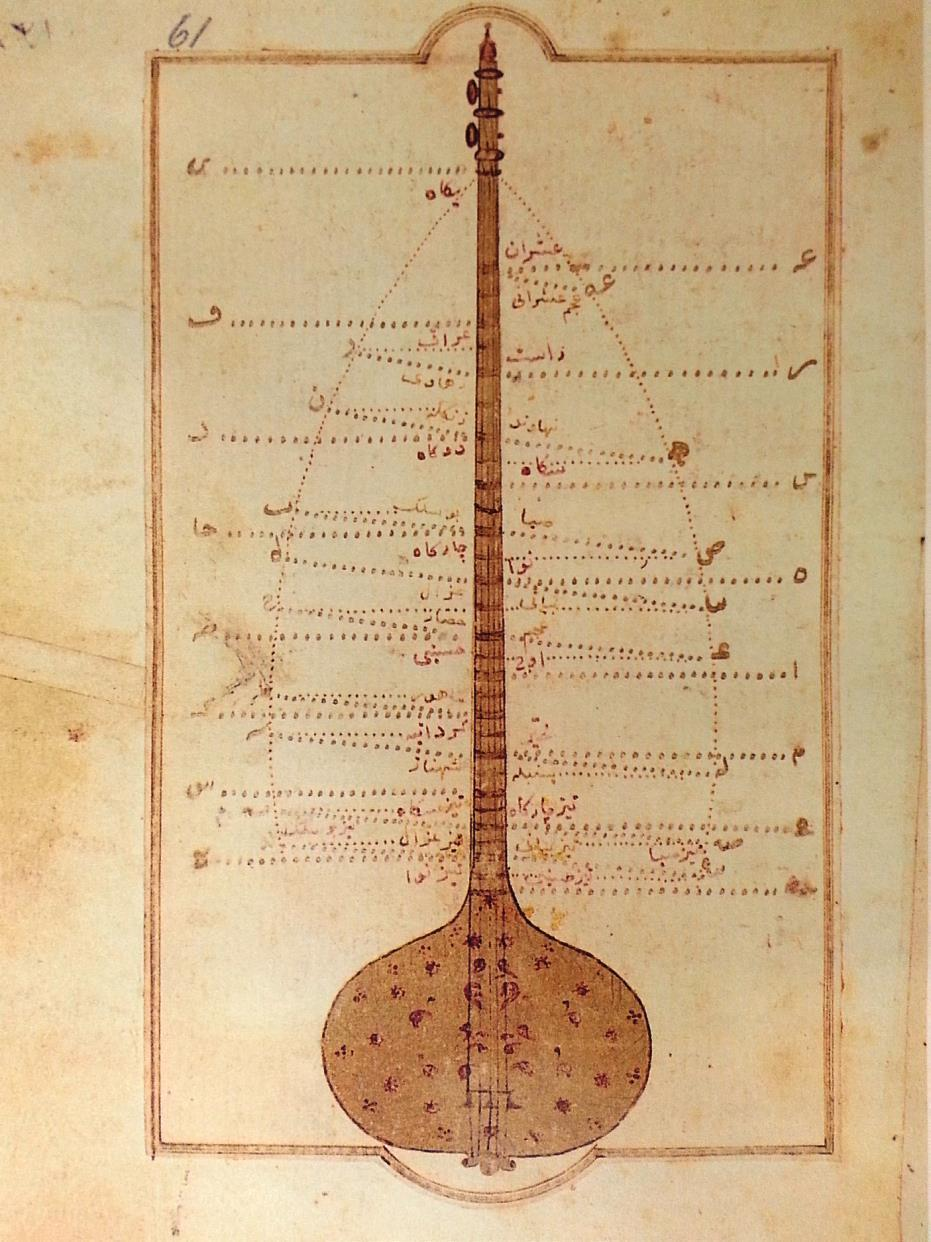
1700–1703. Tanbûr from the book Kitâb-i ‘Ilmü’l Mûsîkî ala Vechi’l-Hurûfat by Dimitrie Cantemir

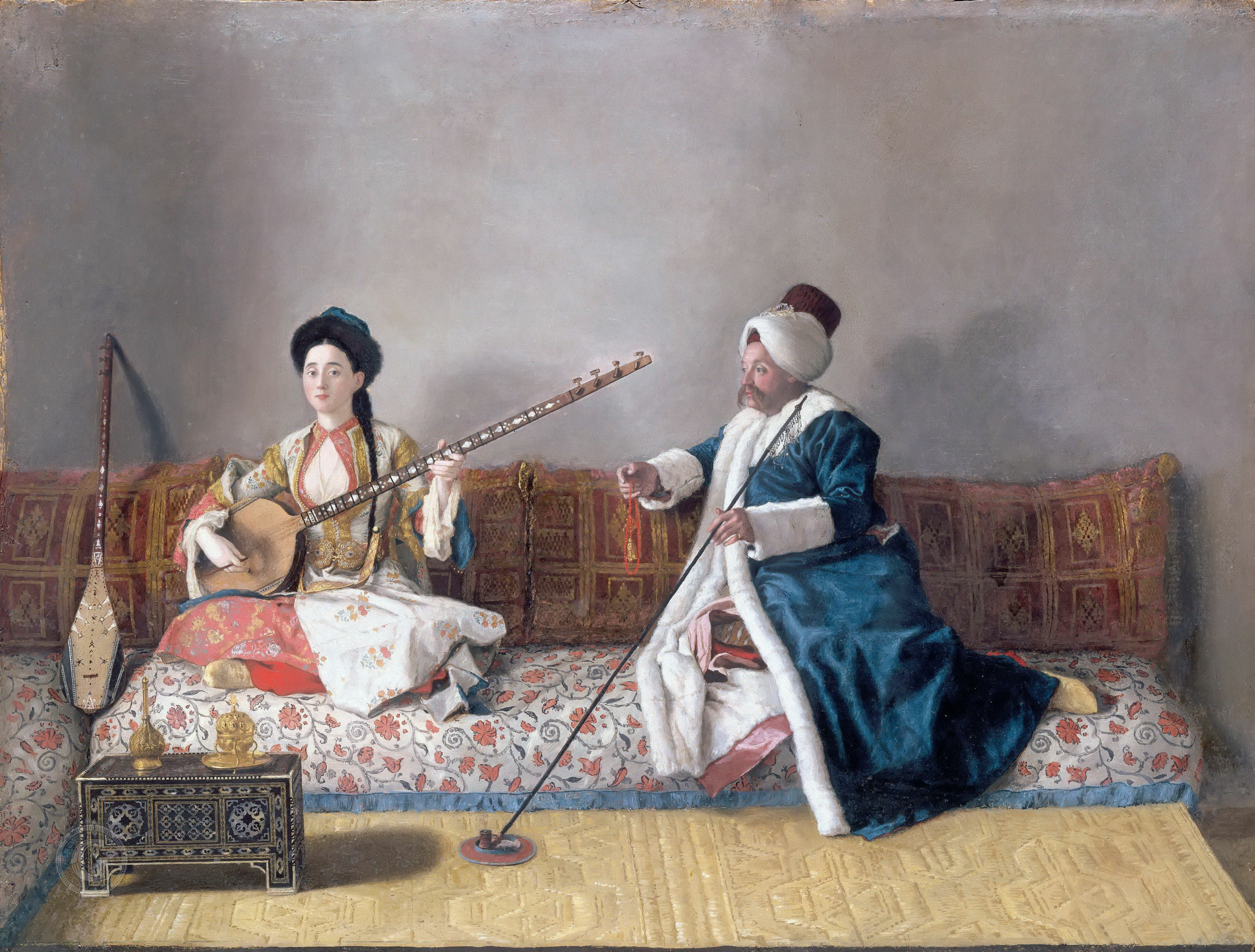
1740, painter Jean-Étienne Liotard. Europeans dressed up in traditional "Tartar" costume.

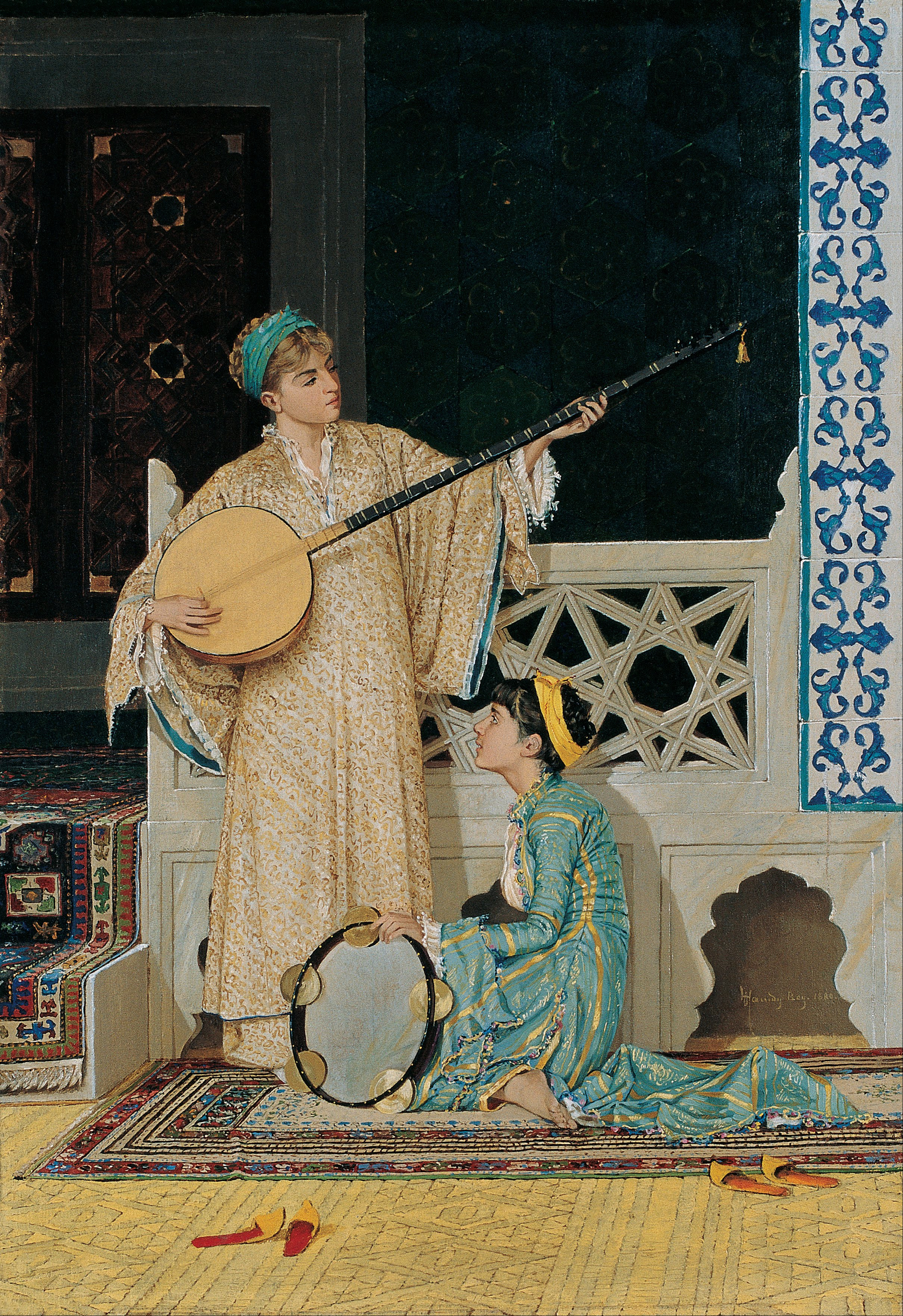
1880. Painting by Osman Hamdi Bey

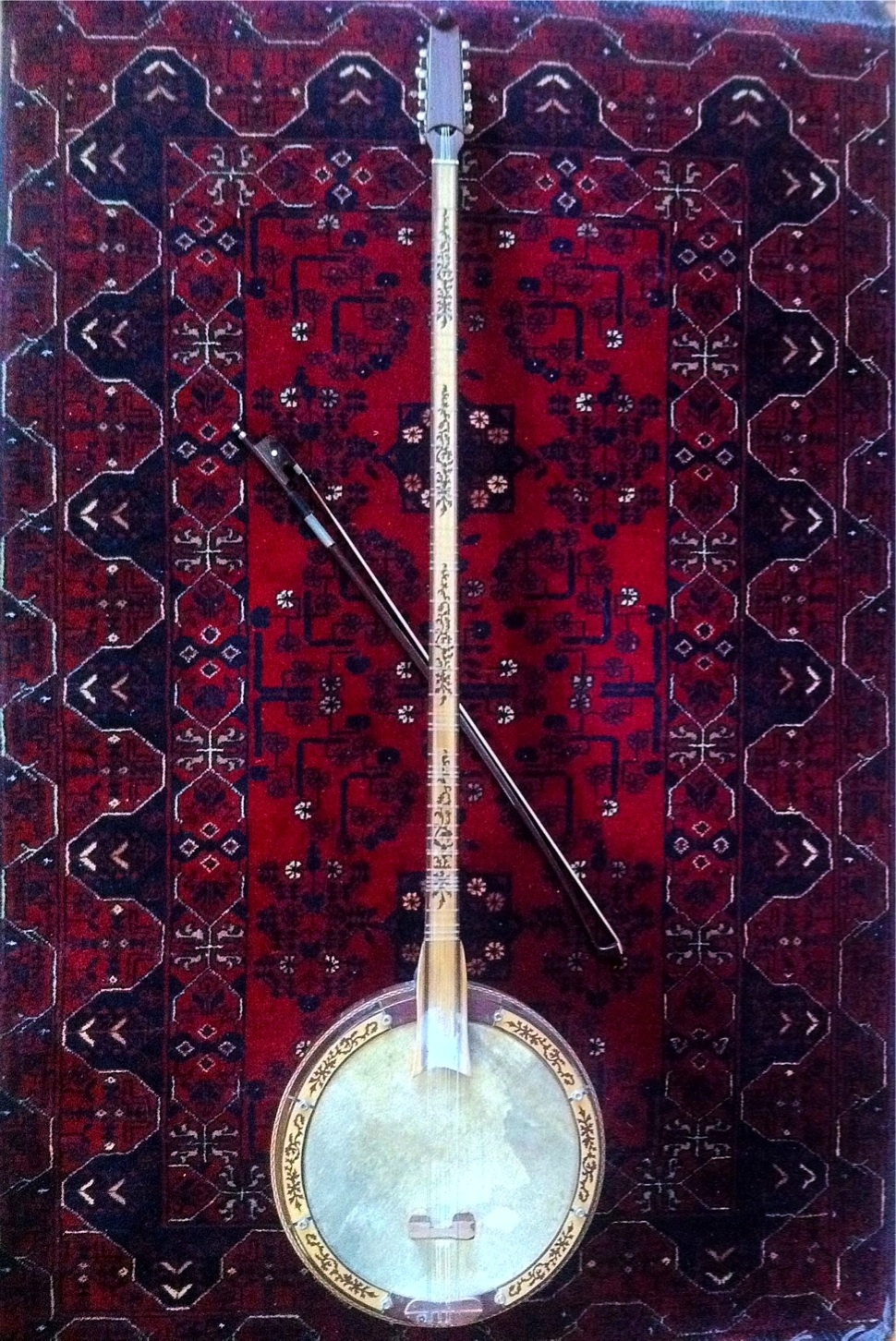
Yaylı Tambur

== Performers and techniques ==
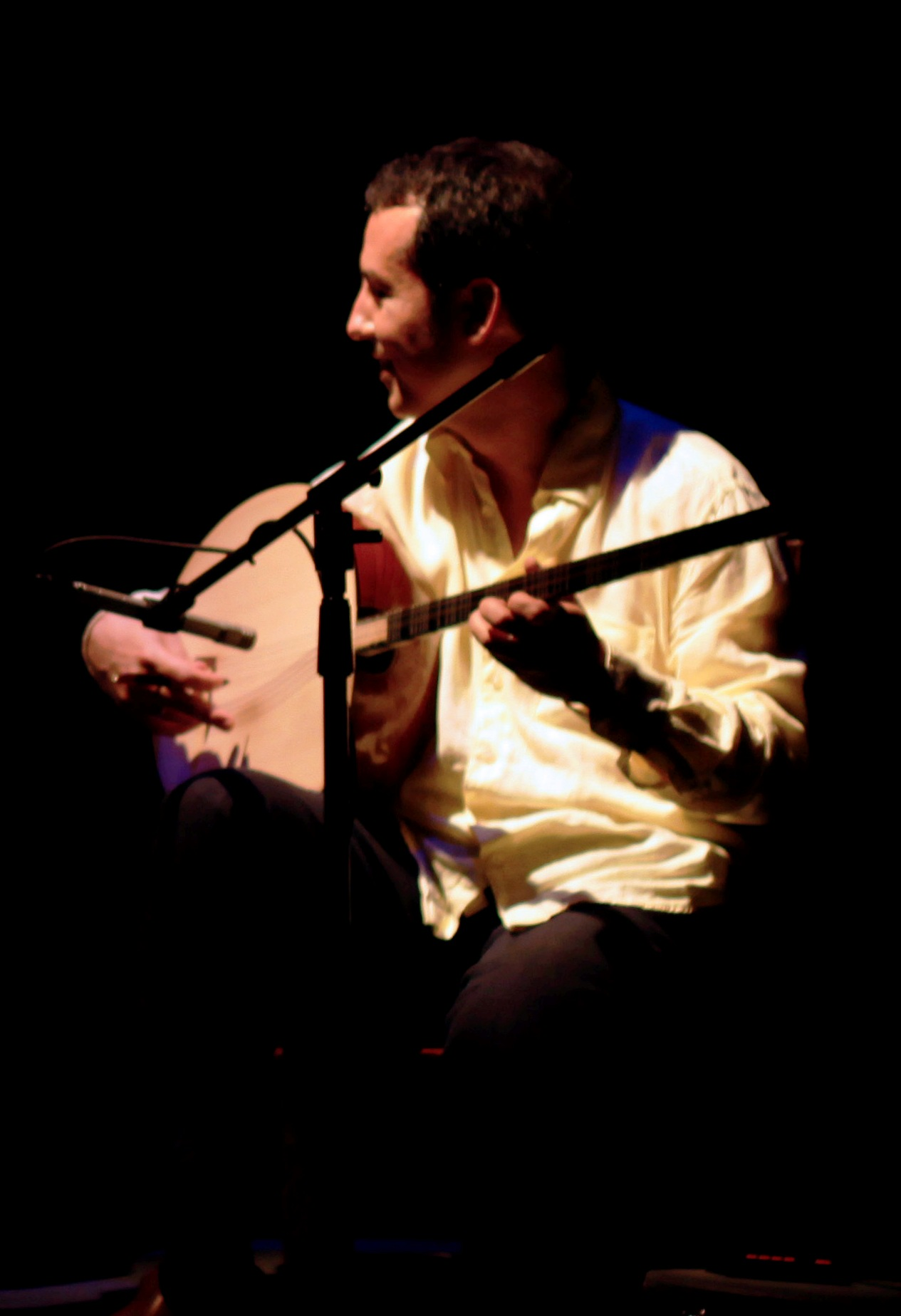
A Turkish tambur player (Murat Aydemir)

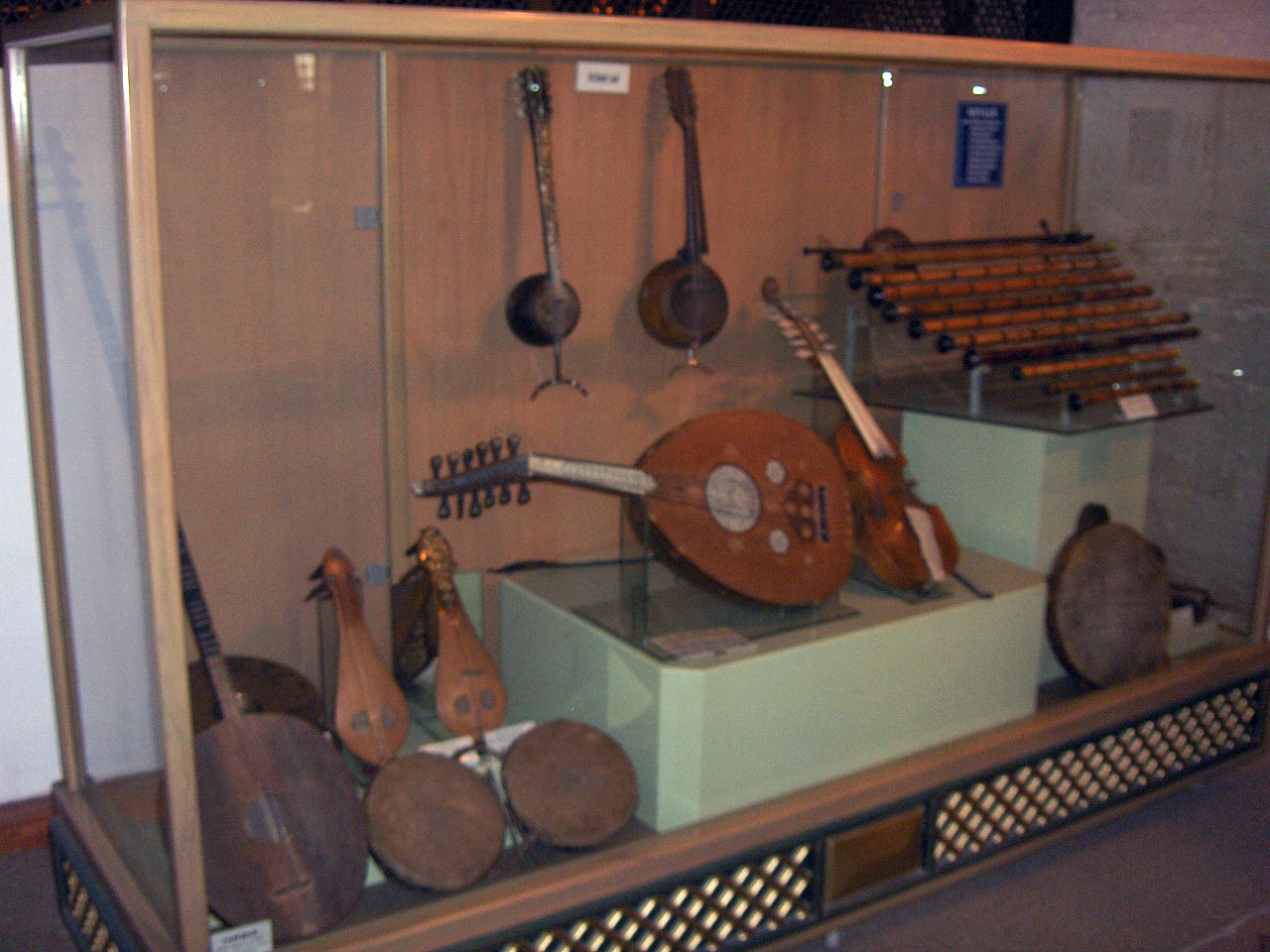
The far left instrument is Turkish tambur

Owing to its long past, the tambur has let flourish several schools of interpretation. The oldest description of tamburîs is reported by the French traveller Charles Fonton who describes the use of catgut frets. A Turkish musical theory written in the beginning of the 18th century by the famous Dimitrie Cantemir elucidates for the first time the proper intervals to use.

Yet there is little mention of playing styles and the first tambur master recorded by chronicles and of whom we have solid information is İzak Efendi, who is said to have brought the playing technique to maturity. Today, he is considered as the reference of the "old style" in tambur playing, partially recovered in the 20th century by Mesut Cemil. Sheikh of the Rifai Tekkesi in Kozyatağı (Istanbul) Abdülhalim Efendi was his pupil and carried on the same tradition.

Among notable 18th-century players were Numan Ağa, Zeki Mehmed Ağa, Küçük Osman Bey, all of whom remained representatives of this allegedly old style. The first virtuoso to claim renovation was Tanburi Büyük Osman Bey who broke with his father Zeki Mehmed Ağa's technique to present his own. Later on, this later style became so prevalent that the older technique came to suffer oblivion. The musical heritage transmitted to Suphi Ezgi by Abdülhalim Efendi, and from the former to Mesut Cemil, an eminent figure in 19th century Turkish classical music, has helped retrieve the essentials of this old technique. One last important tamburi successfully performing according to principles of the old school was Cemil Özbal (1908–1980) from Gaziantep.

Yet the most renowned and probably the most prolific of tamburis is Cemil Bey, who not only excelled in virtuosity but bequeathed a heritage that later prominent figures of Turkish Classical Music such as Neyzen Niyazi Sayın and Tamburi Necdet Yaşar claimed.

== See also ==
- Category:Tanbur players
