= TCG Atılay (1938) =

Turkish submarine (1938–1942)

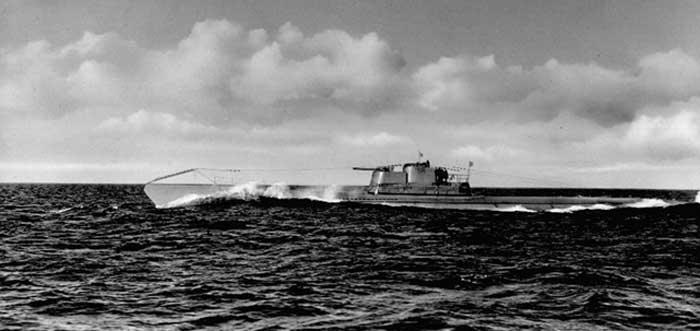
- Atılay underway at sea

History

Turkey
- Name: TCG Atılay
- Builder: Germaniawerft, Kiel
- Laid down: 14 August 1937
- Launched: 1938
- Fate: Mined and sunk 14 July 1942

General characteristics
- Class & type: Ay-class submarine (model:Germania)
- Displacement: 934 long tons (949 t) surfaced 1,210 long tons (1,230 t) submerged
- Length: 80.0 m (262 ft 6 in)
- Beam: 6.40 m (21 ft 0 in)
- Draught: 4.26 m (14 ft 0 in)
- Propulsion: 2 shafts Burmeister & Wain diesels: 3,500 bhp (2,600 kW) 2 electric motors: 1,000 shp (750 kW)
- Speed: 20 kn (23 mph; 37 km/h) surfaced 9 kn (10 mph; 17 km/h) dived
- Armament: 6× 533 mm (21 inch) torpedo tubes 1× 100 mm gun 1× Oerlikon 20 mm cannon anti-aircraft gun

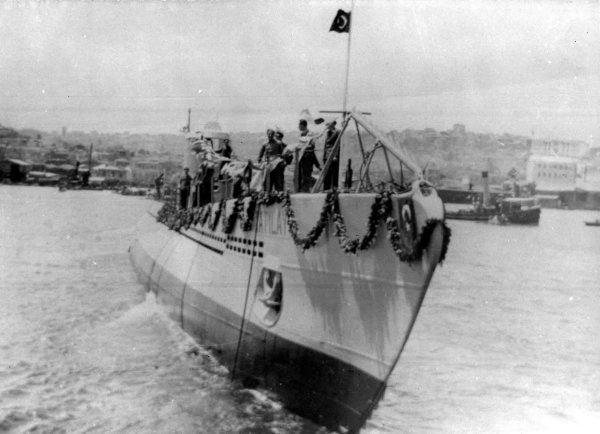
Turkish Navy submarine Atılay during launch in 1939.

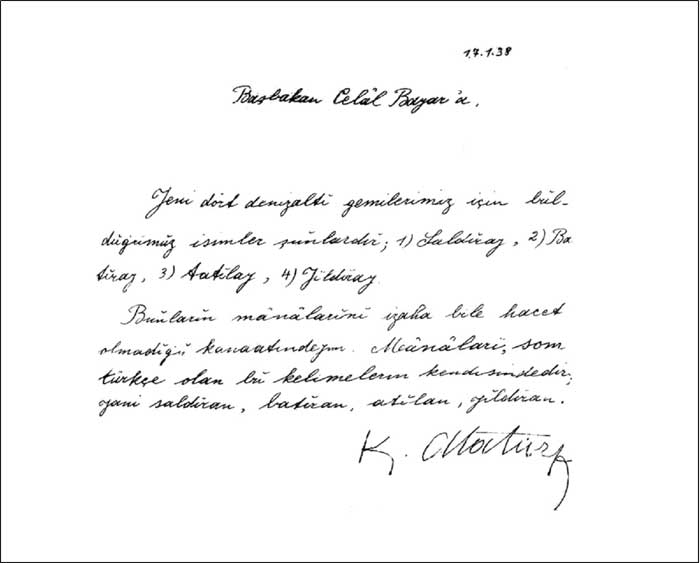
Hand-written decree of President Mustafa Kemal Atatürk on 17 January 1938 for naming the four submarines. (Document is exhibited at Istanbul Naval Museum).

TCG Atılay was a submarine of the Turkish Navy, which sank on 14 July 1942. Its wreck was located after more than 50 years.

She was built at Germaniawerft, Kiel, being launched in 1938. Her name was chosen as Atılay personally by a written decree of the founder of the modern Turkey President Mustafa Kemal Atatürk (1881–1938). Her sister submarines were named Saldıray, Batıray and Yıldıray. She was commissioned on 19 May 1939. The submarine was 80 m (260 ft) long and her full crew was 52.

== Sinking ==
On 14 July 1942, Atılay was tasked by the Fleet Command to conduct testing on underwater magnetic security lines in the Dardanelles Strait. Carrying 38 crew, she was commanded by LCdr Sadi Gürcan.

The vessel came to Çanakkale and moored around 7:30 hours local time. After a briefing held between 8:00 and 9:00, she dived in Morto Bay at 14:30 to leave the Strait, accompanied by a security boat on the surface. However, due to bad weather conditions, the escort boat soon lost its contact with the submarine. As the submarine did not return in due time, two navy boats were sent for search and rescue operation. At 20:30, the submarine's rescue buoy was found. The emergency station of the navy was, however, unable to establish a telephone contact with the submarine although the telephone in the rescue buoy was intact. A seaman named Ahmet Bağdat, who had disembarked for crew rations, was the only one to survive the disaster. The fate of the submarine remained unknown for years.

== Aftermath ==
In 1994 after more than 50 years, Selçuk Kolay, with the support of the Rahmi M. Koç Foundation for Museum Studies and Culture, found in a two-and-half-month research the exact location of the wreck of Atılay. She was 5 km (3.1 mi) offshore and was lying at a depth of 68 m (223 ft). A 1.5-metre-wide (4.9 ft) hole in the hull proved that she hit a naval mine. It is assumed that the mine was a World War I munition, which was laid during the Dardanelles Campaign.

A crew member, Warrant officer Fethi Yüceses, was the husband of Hamiyet Yüceses, a well-known Turkish singer. After the 14 July event, she released a song Gitti de Gelmeyiverdi ("He Went and Didn't Return"), which became a popular song of the time.

== Museum project ==
In the general congress of Chambers of Shipping a project was proposed by the architect Kaya Şener. According to this project the submarine will be relocated in 30 meters depth and a museum will be established in the submarine. So far the project is not realised.
