= Sadettin Kaynak =

Turkish composer

Sadettin Kaynak (1895 – 3 February 1961) was a prominent composer of Turkish classical music.

== Biography ==
Born in Istanbul, he became a hafiz at a young age. He lost his father early in his youth. He completed his music education at the Istanbul University. Later, he traveled to south east Anatolia and researched Turkish folk music there. He was supported by the new republic; he was one of the most important composers of Turkish classical music. He introduced western concepts in unique "makams" (movements). He supported the reforms introduced by Atatürk. Being an Imam, he was one of the first religious people reciting "Muslim prayers call known as Ezan" in pure Turkish. He composed over 300 songs in classical Turkish music. He had a stroke in 1955, and lived paralyzed until his death on 3 February 1961. He was buried at Merkezefendi Cemetery.

== Major works ==
Below is a list of some of his compositions with the associated makam. He has got 330 composition in 42 different makam.

- Dertliyim ruhuma hicranını (segah-nihavend)
- Bir esmer dilberin vuruldum hüsnüne (kürdilihicazkar)
- Leyla (hicazkar)
- Enginde yavaş yavaş (hicaz)
- Kalplerden dudaklara (nihavent)
- Ben güzele güzel demem (mahur)
- Batan gün kana benziyor (muhayyer)
- Çıkar yücelerden haber sorarım (hüzzam).

== See also ==
- Laïkó
