= Ottoman music =

Classical music of the Ottoman Empire

Ottoman music (Turkish: Osmanlı müziği) or Turkish classical music (Turkish: Klasik Türk musikisi, or more recently Türk sanat müziği, 'Turkish art music') is the tradition of classical music originating in the Ottoman Empire. Developed in the palace, major Ottoman cities, and Sufi lodges, it traditionally features a solo singer with a small to medium-sized instrumental ensemble.

A tradition of music that reached its golden age around the early 18th century, Ottoman music traces its roots back to the music of the Hellenic and Persianate world, a distinctive feature of which is the usage of a modal melodic system. This system, alternatively called makam, dastgah or echos, is a large and varied system of melodic material, defining both scales and melodic contour. In Ottoman music alone, more than 600 makams have been used so far, and out of these, at least 120 makams are in common use and formally defined. Rhythmically, Ottoman music uses the zaman and usûl systems, which determine time signatures and accents respectively. A wide variety of instruments has been used in Ottoman music, which include the turkish tanbur (lute), ney (end-blown reed flute), klasik kemençe (lyra), keman (violin), kanun (zither), and others.

Until the 19th century, in which Westernization caused Western classical music to replace the native Ottoman tradition, Ottoman music remained the dominant form of music in the empire, and therefore evolved into a diverse form of art music, with forms such as the peşrev, kâr and saz semaî evolving drastically over the course of the empire's history, as the Ottomans' classical tradition also found its place outside of the court. By the end of the 18th century, Ottoman music had incorporated a diverse repertoire of secular and religious music of a wide variety of musicians, including post-Byzantine music, Sephardic music and others.

19th century Ottoman elites saw Ottoman music as primitive and underdeveloped in relation to Western music, and stopped its courtly patronage. This resulted in many classical musicians being forced to work in entertainment-related contexts, and gave rise to a much simpler style, named gazino. After the Ottoman Empire collapsed, the new republican elite tried to suppress Ottoman music further, in an attempt to hasten the process of Westernization. The decline which followed resulted in drastic changes in Ottoman music, and as the new republican elite failed to create an alternative to Ottoman music, the remnants of Ottoman tradition were appropriated and nationalized by the 1980 military regime.

== Naming conventions ==
The naming conventions of the Ottoman's Empire's classical tradition are the cause of significant controversy, as naming schemes proposed by governments often place significant importance on the "nationalization" of music, resulting in contradiction.

It is known that the Ottomans did not often distinguish between different musical traditions, calling them all by the name musikî, ultimately from Ancient Greek mousiké. This naming convention broke down during the Westernization of the Ottoman Empire, as Western cultural norms and practices were slowly integrated into the empire. The resulting dichotomy between Western and Ottoman classical music was referred to as alafranga and alaturka (European and Turkish) by the Ottoman elites. However, as the Ottoman Empire collapsed, new terms were employed for the Ottoman tradition, forming the current naming convention of Ottoman music.

The controversies fueled by these changes are often further aggravated by an uncertainty of periodization; according to researcher on Middle Eastern music Owen Wright, starting from late 17th century, Ottoman music differed from its predecessors to such an extent that "if the two were juxtaposed, we would need to speak of musical diglossia." Walter Zev Feldman, another researcher on Middle Eastern music, has therefore claimed that a uniquely Ottoman style emerged no earlier than the 1600s.

Numerous comparative works done by Greek musicians of the 18th and 19th centuries have also pointed out that "the Greek and Turkish modal systems resemble each other to a very high degree", and that there was a near "one-to one correspondence" in terms of most diatonic and non-diatonic structures, as well as the chords that make up the two traditions' modal structures.

== History ==
=== Early Ottoman music ===
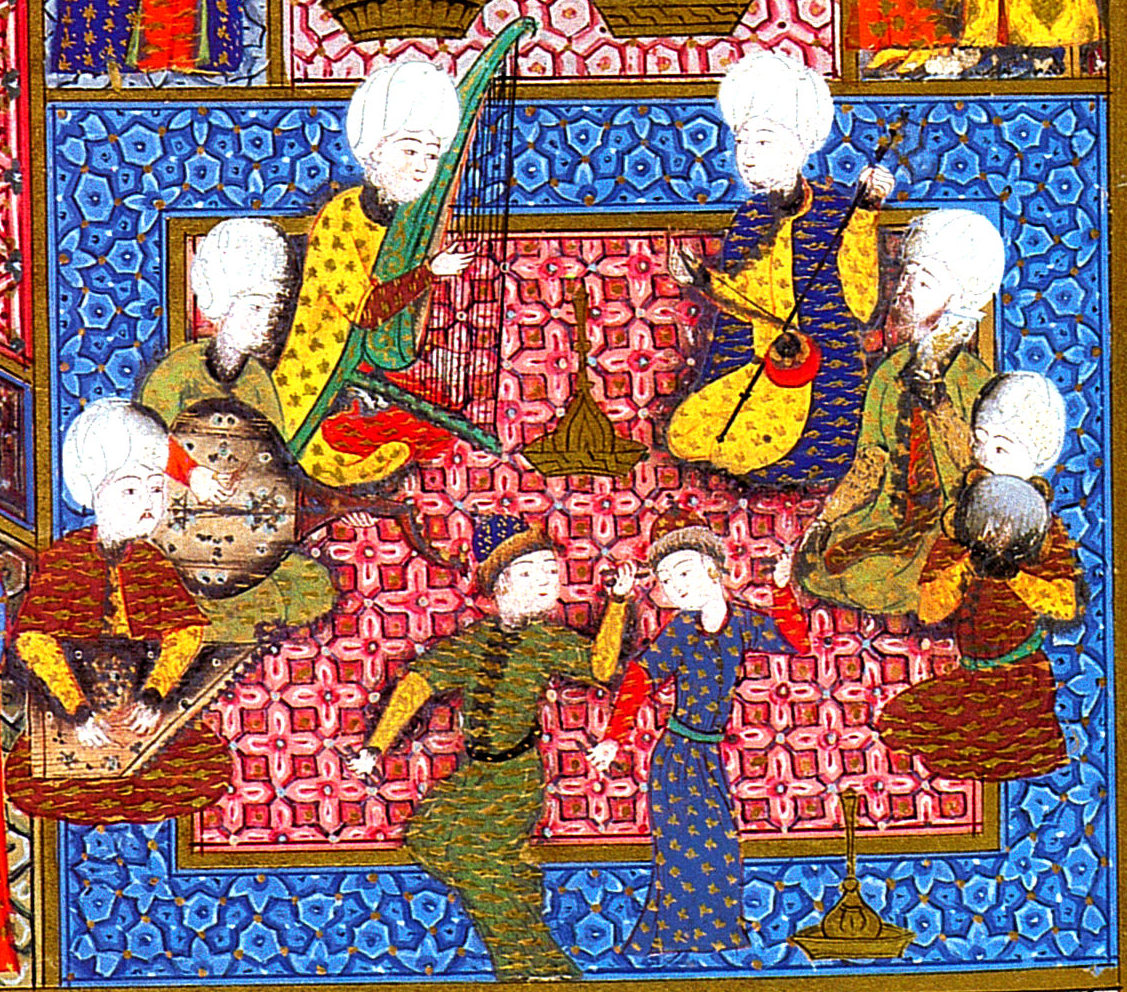
Miniature of dancers (köçeks) and musicians performing at a circumcision ceremony. Dated 1530 from the Süleymanname

While it is well established that Ottoman music is closely related to its geographical neighbors, namely Byzantine, Persian and Arabic music, early histories of Ottoman classical music, called "mythologies" by Feldman, emphasize a sense of continuity, as opposed to a synthesis of different musical styles. The Ottomans, as a Persianate empire, had assumed "an unbroken continuity from medieval Greater Iran (i.e. Herat to Istanbul)," while in republican Turkey, the history of Ottoman classical music was deeply tied to "musical figures of the medieval Islamic civilization, such as al-Farabi, Ibn Sina, and al-Maraghi with the Ottomans." Despite this, existing sources can be consulted to create a musical history with both continuity and "radical breaks".

Most of the musical vocabulary that makes up Ottoman tradition is either Arabic or Persian, as until the Edvar of Hızır bin Abdullah, there had not been any notable music theory treatises written in Turkish; Turkic empires relied on works written in Persian to compose their own music. Therefore, early Ottoman music was not significantly different from those of earlier Near and Middle Eastern societies; modal, heterophonic music with a richly developed melodic line and complex rhythmic structures.

The Ottomans, until the 15th century, tried to imitate the Timurid Renaissance; the "musical creativity taking place in the Timurid courts of Eastern Iran and Central Asia" was viewed to be of legendary status. This resulted in a variety of new musical works that were composed in the 15th century, with a loosening of the traditional nawba cycle and the gradual adoption of various styles along with a court-patronized, vivid musical scene, which was referred to as the "first Ottoman romanticism" by Wittek and later, musician and musicologist Çinuçen Tanrıkorur.

=== Classical Age ===
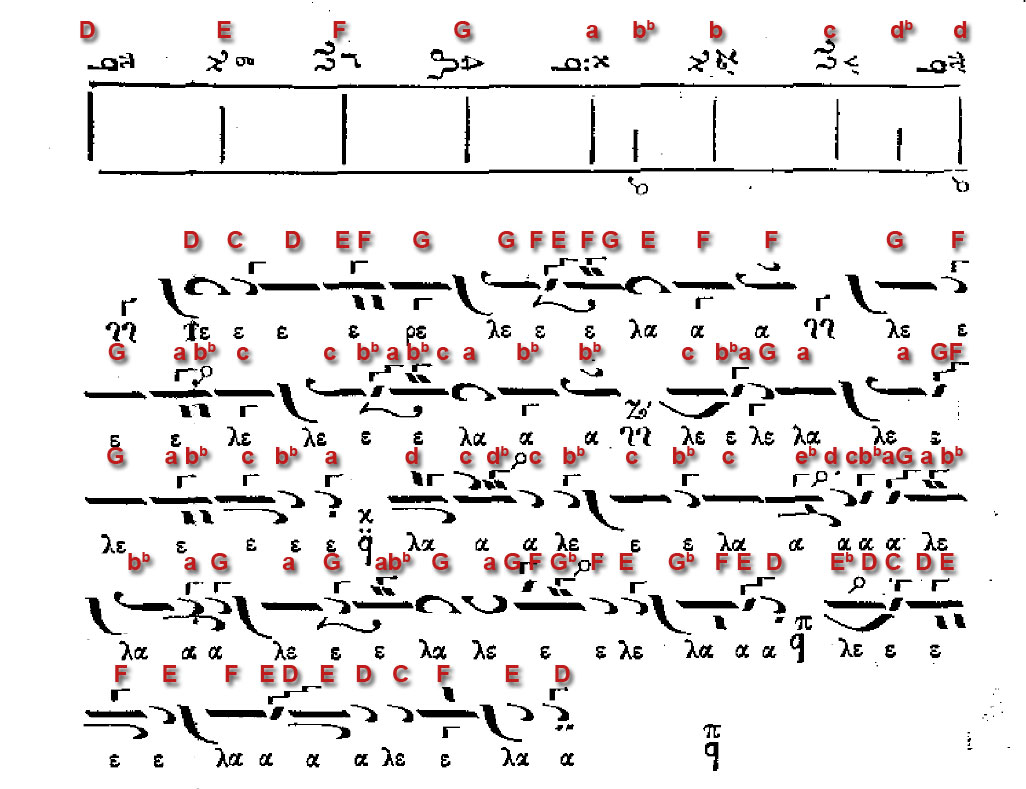
A transcription and analysis of Ottoman music using Byzantine notation.

While the classical age of the Ottoman Empire is often viewed as an age when Ottoman hegemony over Europe had reached a peak, Tanrıkorur argues that "the evolution of the Ottoman music did not always follow a parallel to the stages of the evolution of the Empire, in terms of her political and economic dimensions." In fact, because of the sudden decline of Persian classical music which, according to Feldman, "prevented the entire musical system of the previous era to be preserved and transmitted", the largely Persianate music of the courts witnessed a gradual return to folk styles, with a particular emphasis placed on the murabba form. While many peşrevs and semais, which were tightly integrated into Ottoman society, were widely enjoyed by the upper classes, these were often simplified, with a notable absence of long and complex rhythmic cycles.

Anthologies indicate that by the 16th century, the sophisticated rhythmic cycles of 15th-century Persianate music had been neglected by a large majority of the Persianate world. In fact, many 15th-century works had their rhythmic cycles changed in the newer anthologies, which suggests that virtually no original works from the 15th were being played in their unaltered form in the 16th century. The nawba, or an early long-form performance, had also been lost, and would be replaced by the fasıl about a hundred years later.

16th century records, compared to 15th century ones, feature many more pieces attributed to composers of the 14th century and earlier. This, according to Wright, was not a natural expansion of repertoire from older composers, but rather "attests to the emergence of pseudo-graphia — spurious works falsely attributed to much earlier and prestigious composers — precisely at the time when the actual works by these musicians were falling into oblivion." Feldman further argues that this may have had two reasons: that the complicated forms of early Ottoman music made the older repertoire harder to consistently play without patronage of the court; or that the breakdown of transmission made it considerably more difficult for new performers to gain access to old works, creating a need for an older, more prestigious "great tradition" from which 17th century Ottoman music would emerge.

However, the classical age is not exclusively a period of decline for Ottoman classical music, as the first signs of a multicultural musical tradition started to appear in the Ottoman Empire. Cristaldi emphasizes that this era marked the beginning of contacts between Persian and Byzantine traditions, which would later fuse to form a recognizably Ottoman style. Synagogal chants were also adapted to the makam system during this era, fueling what would later become the "new synthesis" of Ottoman music. Israel ben Moses Najara, who is sometimes called "the father of Ottoman-Jewish music", and Shlomo Mazal Tov, compiler of the Sefer shirim u-zemirot ve tishbahot (The book of songs, 17 hymns and songs of praise), were very influential in this process, as they, along with many other non-Muslim musicians, started to attend Mevlevi ceremonies in which religious music was played; this fusion would be the driving force behind 17th century Ottoman music.

=== 17th and 18th centuries ===
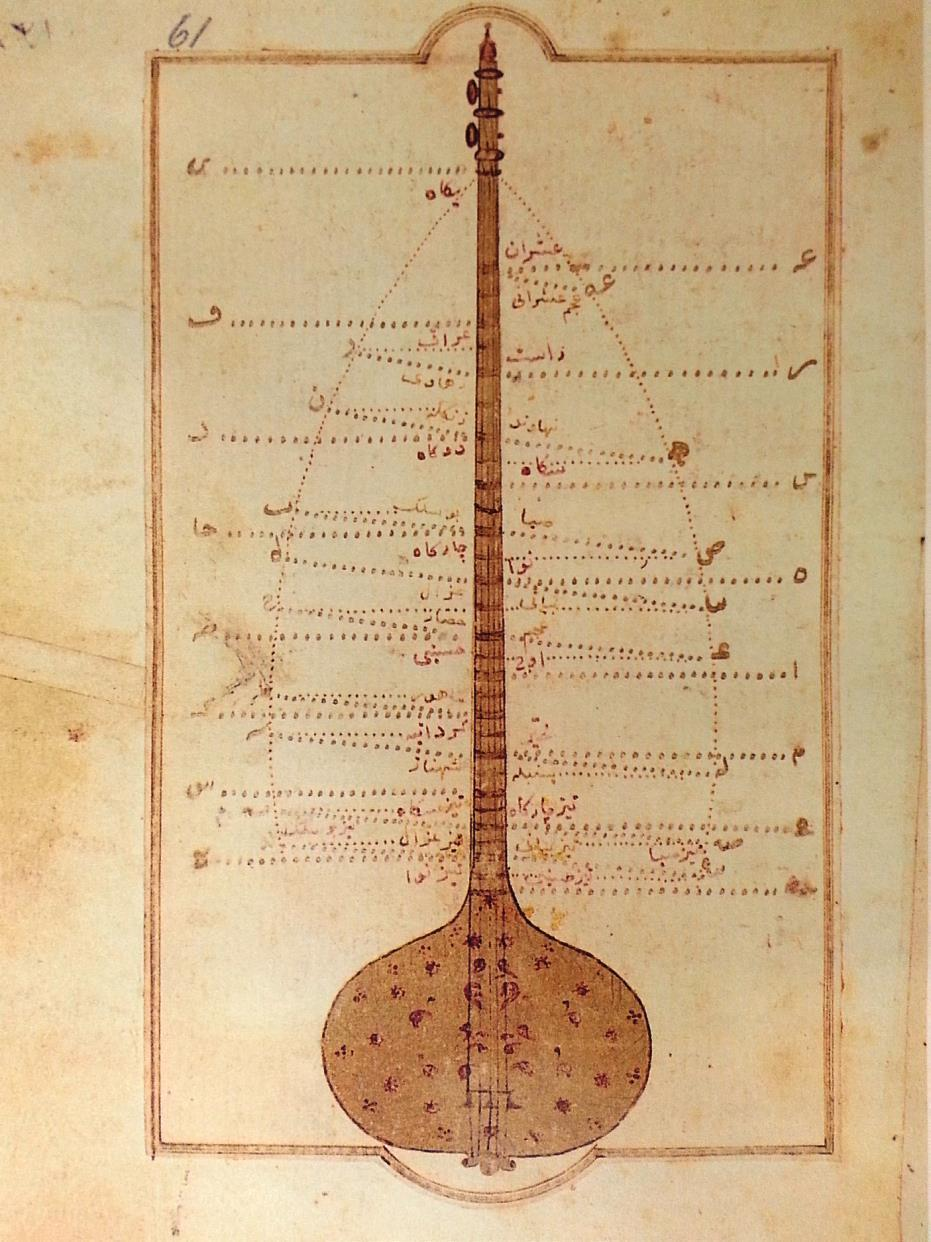
Description and illustration of a tanbûr from Kitâb-ı ‘İlmü’l Mûsîkî ala Vechi’l-Hurûfat, written by Dimitrie Cantemir.

A new style of Ottoman music, called the "new synthesis" by Feldman, emerged in the second half of the 17th century, is often described as a form of "local modernity" and a "musical renaissance", where the complexity of 15th-century Near and Middle Eastern court music was regained and expanded upon. This musical revival was largely the work of "aristocratic Muslims and Mevlevi dervish musicians", and resulted in a renewed sense of musical progress, which had broken down during the Ottomans' classical age.

One of the most notable composers of "new synthesis" Ottoman classical music is Kasımpaşalı Osman Effendi, whose focus, along with his students, was on reviving the tradition of complex rhythmic cycles. These new rhythmic cycles were later used by his student Hafız Post to fit the more folkloric, popular poetry form murabba, bridging the gap between older Persian classical works and newer Anatolian ones, created after the decline of Persian music in the 16th century. Meanwhile, other students of Osman Effendi, such as Mustafa Itri, sought out the conventions of Byzantine music, incorporating the concepts of the Orthodox tradition into his works as well as his treatises. This significantly bolstered the exchange between Byzantine and Ottoman music, and the resulting era featured a number of Greek composers, most notably Peter Peloponnesios, Hanende Zacharia and Tanburi Angeli. Increasingly, modal structures between the two traditions began to converge as well, as manuscripts often recorded both echoi and makams of composed pieces. A piece during this time might have been recorded as "Segâh makam, usûl muhammes, echos IV legetos", noting similarities and equivalences between the two systems.

The influence of Osman Effendi had effects beyond his immediate students and into well-known Eastern European intellectual Dimitrie Cantemir's understanding of music history, as he elucidates on multiple occasions the rapid decline and renaissance Ottoman music had experienced of the 16th and 17th century, stating that:

"The art of musick almost forgot, not only re-viv’d, but was rendered more perfect by Osman Effendi, a noble Constantinopolitan.”

— Dimitrie Cantemir

Despite the acknowledgement of a break in the Ottomans' musical tradition, Cantemir asserts the supremacy of many aspects of Ottoman music over that of Western music at numerous points during his Edvâr. While this may or may not have been representative of the consensus among Ottoman composers at the time, it was not necessarily surprising, according to Leezenberg, as Western ideas of cultural supremacy were not widespread in Europe until the end of the 18th century, although critiques of the "confused" (microtonal) intervals of Ottoman music were.

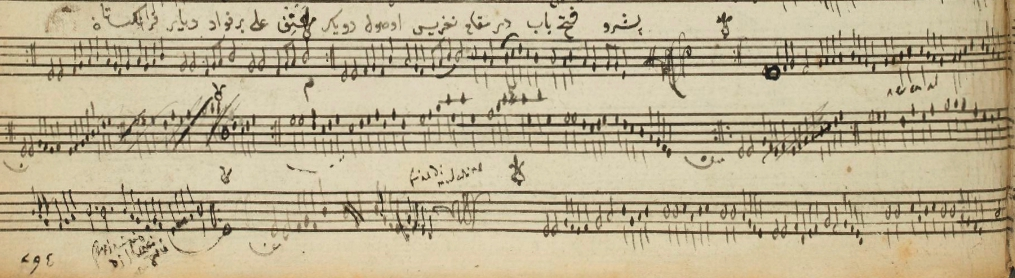
A peşrev (prelude) transcribed into staff notation by Polish musician Wojciech Bobowski. The use of abjad notation was more common in the Ottoman Empire until the 20th century.

Cantemir's Edvâr, possibly the most influential musical treatise written in the Ottoman Empire, is also often hailed as a paradigm shift in the Ottoman understanding of music theory. The lack of a poetic style, as well as an empirical and practical focus, is said to set Cantemir's Edvar apart from earlier works, and would influence the treatises of later theorists.

Secular art music and religious music were rarely intertwined in the early Ottoman Empire, however, their traditions were often closely related to each other; this resulted in the gradual introduction of Mevlevi elements to Ottoman classical music.

This new synthesis had a wide range of implications for Ottoman music. While earlier Persianate music had a tendency to leave old forms and create new ones in times of societal instability, by the early 1700s, a new synthesis of Ottoman classical music had resulted in a relatively stable musical canon and a broad understanding of advanced music theory. According to Feldman, this new period in Ottoman music had led to many distinguishable features of Ottoman classical tradition, including the "sophistication of the system of rhythmic cycles", "fine distinctions in intonation" and fasıl structure. This phenomenon has been compared to the sense of musical progress that had been taking place in the West during the 17th and 18th century, a process that has been called “locally generated modernity.”

=== Decline ===
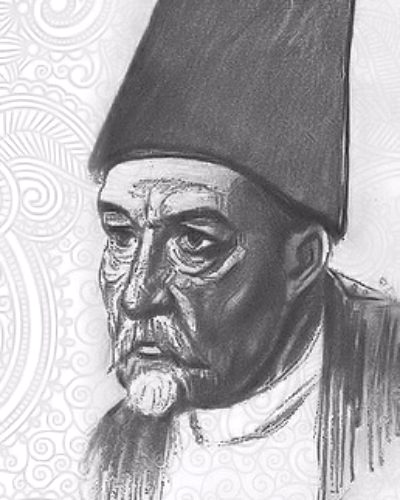
A painting of Hammamizade İsmail Dede Efendi, a Turkish composer of Ottoman classical music.

Starting from the turn of the 19th century, Western classical music found much greater patronage in court, chiefly after the death of Mahmud II. While Mahmud II continued the patronage of a native musical tradition, the following sultans, namely the Western-oriented Abdulmejid I and the conservative Abdul Hamid II were enthusiastic in their support for Western classical music. Many composers of Western classical music, such as Donizetti Pasha, were held in high esteem in the Ottoman court, while Ottoman music suffered official neglect. This caused many prominent Ottoman composers, including Ismail Dede Efendi, who had previously been called "the greatest composer of the 19th century" by the Ottomans, to leave the court, spurring Ottoman music to a state of adaptation.

As the courtly Ottoman tradition declined in the mid 19th century, a popular "middle-brow" style was created and called gazino, which all but completely abandoned the old rhythmic complexity of Ottoman classical music, replacing it with danceable, simple rhythms and embellished melodies. According to O'Connell, this newer music was also significantly influenced by Western motifs, particularly "in the realms of musical techniques, performance styles, and ensemble practice."

While many in Sufi Muslim, Orthodox Christian and Jewish Maftirim traditions opposed this, and continued transferring the old style in their respective communities, official neglect made it very difficult for the system to function. Therefore, many musicians, such as Şevki Bey and Tanburi Cemil Bey, avoided the court altogether, constituting the end of Ottoman classical music as the "official" art music of the empire.

=== Persecution and revival ===
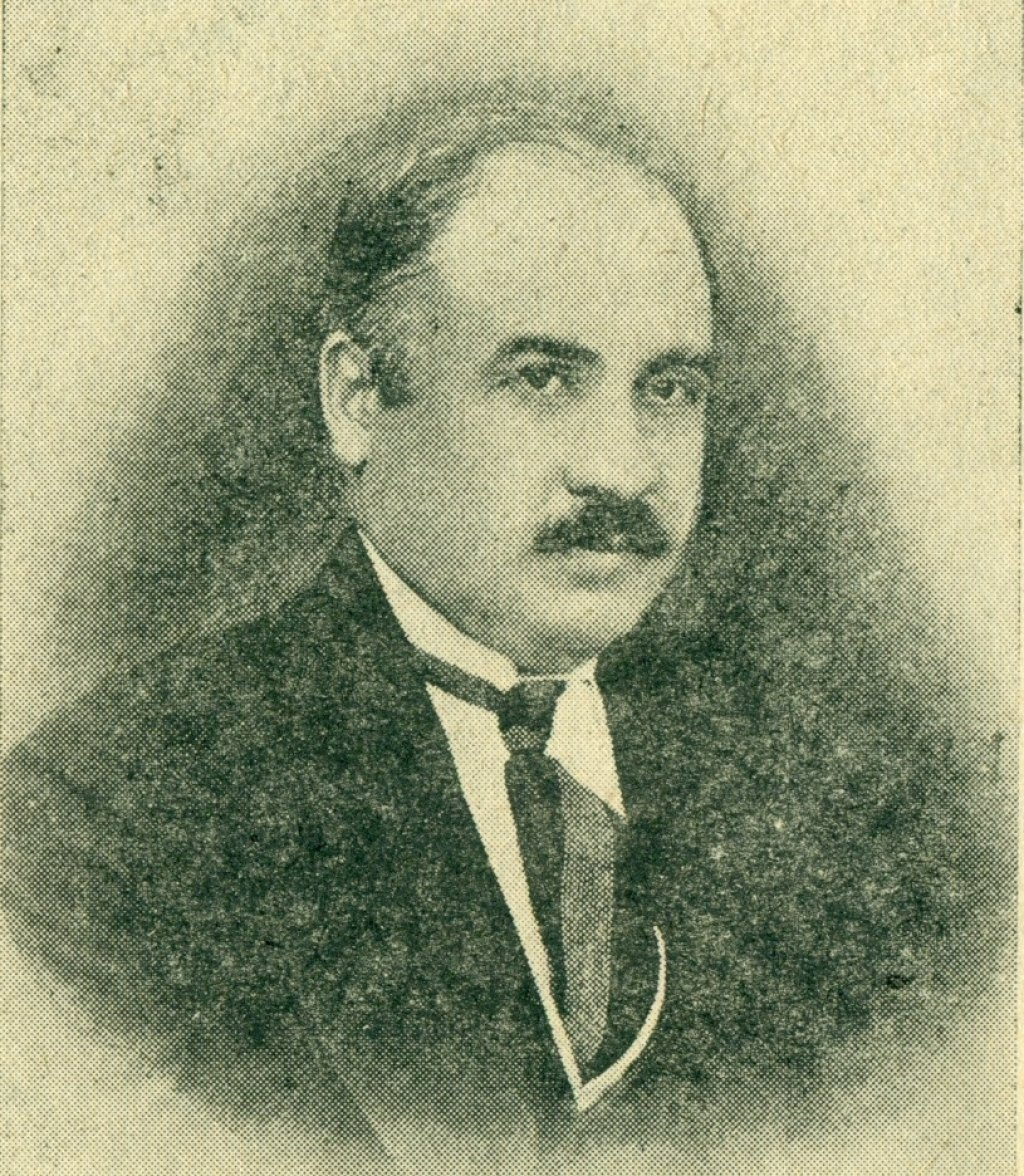
Ziya Gökalp, one of the main proponents for the suppression of Ottoman music.

As the Ottoman Empire collapsed, and was succeeded by the Republic of Turkey, the Westernized elite regarded Ottoman classical tradition with a growing amount of disdain. Ziya Gökalp, a prominent nationalist thinker, thought of "Eastern music" as inferior to both Western classical and Turkish folk music, advocating the replacement of Ottoman tradition with a synthesis of these two traditions. The reason of this 'inferiority', according to John O'Connell, is that the multicultural, "chaotic" nature of Ottoman art music was not "high culture" by its 20th-century Western conception, creating a clash where Ottoman traditions were classified by the new Westernized elite to fit the notions of a more 'primitive' music than its Western counterparts, and therefore Western music was equated with progressivism, while Ottoman music was equated with an outmoded conservatism. Many members of the republican elite also viewed Ottoman classical music as 'degenerate' – promoting sexual promiscuity, alcoholism and many other perceived ills of old Ottoman society – while Turkish commas were perceived as 'vulgar'. An extensive debate followed on the merits of Ottoman classical music, where musicians of the tradition denigrated certain aspects of Ottoman music, while showing appreciation for others, indicating that support for Ottoman music had been waning, even among musicians of Ottoman tradition. The government had responded to these changes by reducing financial support for Ottoman music, facilitating its decline.

The reforms on Turkish music strengthened from 1926 onward, when tekkes (Sufi lodges) were closed down, as a response to the ostensibly anti-Western, and thereby counter-revolutionary aspects of Sufism. This meant, with the absence of state support, that neither secular nor religious Ottoman music would survive. Further action was also taken to prevent Ottoman musicians from transmitting their knowledge to newer generations, as a "complete ban" was placed on Ottoman-style music education in 1927. The next year, Mustafa Kemal made his comments on the matter, stating that:

"This unsophisticated music can not feed the needs of the Turkish soul, the Turkish sensibility (...) to explore new paths. We have just heard the music of the civilized world [Western music], and the people who gave a rather anemic reaction to the murmurings known as Eastern music, immediately came to life. Turks are, indeed, naturally vivacious and high-spirited, and if these admirable characteristics were for a time not perceived, it was not their fault.

— Mustafa Kemal

According to Tekelioğlu, Mustafa Kemal managed to blame Ottoman intellectuals for the supposed inferiority of "Eastern" music with this rhetoric, and therefore separated "Turkishness" from the "soporific, Eastern" traditions of the Ottomans. However, while the republican elite, including Mustafa Kemal, were steadfast in their support for Western music, the general public were hesitant, even preferring Arabic stations which played a related tradition of music over that of native ones, which played Western music.

What followed was further radicalization of policy in the 1930s, as music magazines that claimed to resist the revolution of Turkish music were coerced to self-censor, flooded with negative coverage, and later forced to close down. This was followed by a ban of Ottoman music on radio, instituted in 1935. This was defended by poet and cultural figure Ercüment Behzat Lav, who argued that:

"What our millions require is neither mystical tekke music, nor wine, (...) nor wine-glass, nor beloved. Without delay, we must give our people (...) sonic food on a universal scale. The damage already done to people's minds by drinking-house songs and worthless jazz tunes is comparable to the use of morphine and cocaine. We should not forget that in some countries, where musical culture is not as weak as our own, jazz is forbidden in order to protect the musical taste of the people.
Today, if a person were to organize his life along the lines of Ömer Hayyam or Mevlana, he would be very likely be considered mad and perhaps even locked up. It is a social necessity in this mechanizing Turkey of today to confine to the dustbin of history the opium-like music of the unlearned man. (...) In the first step in this sorting and cleansing operation for the ear, the publication and printing of songs should be strictly limited and controlled."

— Ercüment Behzat Lav

While the ban could last no more than a few years, systematic censorship of the types of Turkish music that could be played continued for at least half a century. Tekelioğlu has argued that a major reason of this censorship is the republican elites' unwavering belief in absolute truths and a unified notion of "civilization", in which the technologically advanced West were superior in all of their traditions, including that of music, which in turn justified the policy "for the people's sake".

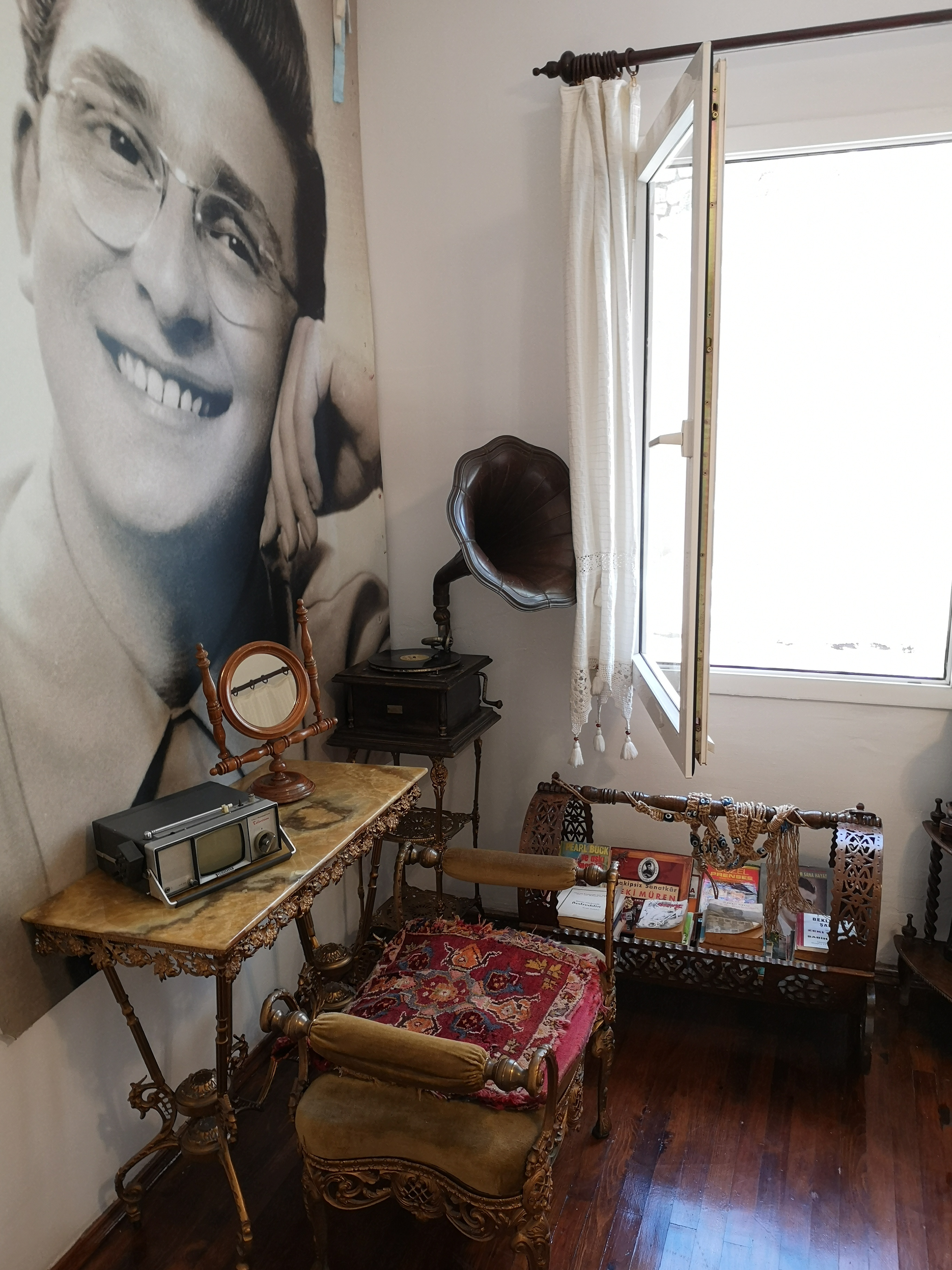
The museum of Zeki Müren, who was a mid-20th century singer of Ottoman classical music known for his gender non-conforming style.

Ottoman music traditions would emerge from around a half-century of persecution around the 1970s and 80s, with the condition that this music was to be nationalized and to no longer feature themes of unattainable love and sorrow, making a "more cheerful" art music than before. In the pursuit of this goal, Ottoman music, which was "the common inheritance of all the peoples who made up the Ottoman societies", was Turkified in a cultural "cleanse". Many Ottoman composers' names were Turkified to give the impression that they had converted and assimilated into Turko-Islamic culture, or otherwise demoted to a position of an outside influence helping the development of a Turkish music. Well-known neyzen Kudsi Erguner therefore argues that "in this way the origin of the art was reconnected to a given nation: the Turks are its owners and the artists of other origins are its servants." The final result of this effort was a genre of music known in Turkey as Türk sanat musikisi, or Turkish art music. While many were supportive of this new style, as it achieved widespread popularity, some musicians, including Erguner, have criticized it, arguing that the songs' lyrics lacked their traditional meaning and that its melodies were 'insipid'.

A popular offshoot, influenced by 19th-century Ottoman practice, formed in the 1970s, and was promptly named arabesk by commentators. O'Connell argues that the name arabesk was a reiteration of an older orientalist dualism "to envisage a Turkish-Arab polarity", instead of an east–west one, and to define "aberrant [musical and cultural] practices with taxonomic efficiency". O'Connell further argues that arabesk served as a link to older, Ottoman-era norms, which, according to him, partly explains the preference against arabesk in elite circles, who had previously categorized these as 'degenerate' and 'promiscuous'. While older Ottoman-style musicians, such as Zeki Müren and Bülent Ersoy did deviate from republican gender norms, the ones exclusively associated with the more rural strand of arabesk, such as Kurdish vocalist İbrahim Tatlıses, presented a masculinity that, according to O'Connell, stressed both "swarthy machismo" and "profligate mannerisms", adopting the melismatic melodic contours of Ottoman singers, judged as effeminate and uncivilized by the earlier republican elite.

== Characteristics ==
Description of sharps and flats in Ottoman music. Reads "C sharps" and "D flats."

While Ottoman music does have characteristics in common with Western classical music, to which it is often compared, Ottoman music theory is largely dependent on two systems separate from that of common practice Western tradition, a system of modal melodic material called makam, and a system of rhythmic cycles called usûl. The theoretical basis of this "melodic material" is a tuning system that divides the octave into 53 tones, uses some of these as named perdes, and prescribes heterophonic "pathways" of melodic development, called seyir, to create pieces. If said melodic material is used in its "purest" form, the resulting composition is called a taksim, or a locally-rhythmic improvisational piece. Composed pieces, however, also utilize usûl, a complex system of meters and accents, which structure the piece.

Ottoman music is played in ensembles similar in size to a chamber orchestra, and Çinuçen Tanrıkorur lists 18 instruments as being common in classical circles; these include the ney, tambur, violin, oud, and qanun among others, although less well-known instruments, like the yaylı tambur, rebab and mıskal, also exist. Despite this, instrumentation in Ottoman classical tradition shows signs of drastic change throughout the centuries. While certain instruments, like the qanun, ney, and the tambur, remained in use for the majority of the empire's history, others were less stable. Çeng, a type of harp, fell out of use in classical repertoire, and the oud had its scope significantly reduced. Some classical instruments were also replaced by folk instruments following Ottoman music's decline during the 19th century; the rebab was replaced by the folk-oriented classical kemençe (also called politiki lyra), and the oud made its return to classical repertoire.

=== Makam ===
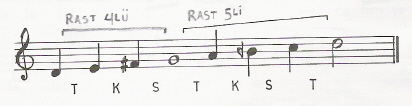
Rast, a basit makam.

Makam (or maqam) is broadly defined as the "melodic material of the Near East, Middle East and Anatolian traditional musics." While it is one of the fundamental parts of Near and Middle Eastern music theory, its definition and classifications have been long debated by music theorists, who belonged to numerous schools of music within Near and Middle Eastern tradition. Makams are often further classified into basit (lit. basic), şed (transposed) and mürekkep (compound). Basit and şed makams can mostly be defined as a scale in the Western sense, while mürekkep ones can not.

Makams are constructed by attaching cins together. Cins are defined as either trichords, tetrachords or pentachords, which modal entities (although not melodic direction) are derived from. This connects most makams together as basic cins are used to define most of them, and provides ample space for continuity and modulation.

Makam is most often used as a synonym of mode, however, Yöre has argued that most makams are modes performed in certain conventions and characteristics. Therefore, two makams might share all their notes, but might not share the same seyir (conventional melodic progression), or vice versa. This creates a very large variety of makams, which are first broken down into families and then into individual makams, which are distinguished most clearly by their seyir. Makams also constitute a hierarchy of pitches, where the "nucleus" of the makam creates its essentials, while other pitches are "secondary" and therefore "mutable". Beken and Signell argue that most makams can be better described in terms of a "broad tonal movement", similar to the purpose of a chord progression in Western music, compounded with the general purpose of a scale.

Seyir is the concept of melodic progression in Ottoman music, disputed among theorists on its characteristics and classifications, and is still an often-researched topic. While there is a popular classification of seyirs, made by the Arel-Ezgi-Üzdilek system, which claims that makams can develop and resolve in ascending and descending fashions, this designation has faced criticism from Yöre among others, who has proposed a definition related to melodic contour.

A related term called terkib exists, and refers to fragmentary phenomena inside a makam that have its own modal qualities. However, this term has been largely out of use since the early 18th century, and its purpose has largely been replaced by the concept of seyir and çeşni, the former of which 'implied' the use of terkibs by associating conventionalized melodic progressions with makams, and the latter of which described fragmentary modal entities that implied a different makam.

==== Modulation ====
According to Powers and Feldman, modulation is usually defined within Ottoman music in three different ways: as transposition, change of melodic structure or progression, and change of a modal "nucleus" (the non-mutable part of a scale); all of these constitute a change in makam. These inter-related definitions have provided ample space for the development of complex modal structures called mürekkep makams, in which simpler makams combine to create more complicated ones that evolve and change through time.

However, Feldman further argues that outside of taksims, modulations and mürekkep makams were uncommon until the late 18th century, and that until that point, makams were only based on basic and secondary scale degrees found in earlier Ottoman music. The shift away from this old system has been attributed to the emergence of the standard 4-hâne instrumental structure, and the zemin-miyan system, which allowed more modulations during pieces by providing a theoretical basis for relationships between makams. By the 19th century, this had led to the "wandering makam" phenomenon, where modulations are in periods shorter than what is necessary to "show" the makam.

=== Usûl ===
Usûls refer to a cyclical system of rhythmic structure, and, similarly to time signatures in Western music, these act as a vehicle to the composition of music. The main difference between usûls and time signatures are that usûls also indicate accents, and a related term zaman is sometimes used to denote an equivalent to Western time signatures. For example, the usûls Çenber and Nimsakil can both be transcribed as 24/4 and are both "24 zamanlı", despite the fact that they differ in their internal divisions. This system of internal division allows for the creation of complex usûls that can only be learned by rote, as Cantemir had pointed out: “because these [usûls] are so intricate, those who do not know the meter cannot play the songs at all, even though they were to hear that song a thousand times.”

Usûls are often further broken down into two categories; short and long usûls. Short usûls, generally dance oriented rhythmic cycles including sofyan and semaî, feature heavy correspondence with melodic lines and aruz meters. A notable exception to this is the aksak semaî usûl, which does not show correspondence with neither melodic lines, nor meters. Long usûls, on the other hand, completely eschew correspondence with aruz, and "function along very different principles from the short ones", according to Feldman, and while this system could describe usûl structures until the 18th century, Feldman argues that in later pieces, "the melodic gestures [of the pieces] frequently overwhelmed the ostensible usûl structures that theoretically supported them."

=== Notation ===
Like most Islamicate musical traditions, the Ottomans used no standardized notation system until the 19th century. While a variety of notation systems were utilized, including Byzantine, staff and abjad notation, these were used largely for archiving and theoretical purposes and read from sparsely. In fact, the Ottomans preferred a system of institutional oral transmission, called meşk. This system was not due to a lack of an understanding of written repertoire as a concept, but a lack of interest in standardization, because of a conception of music that "equalized" the roles of performer and composer. Jäger argues that the conception of a composer in the Ottoman style is vastly different from that of the Western one, the former of which relates to an "opus-cluster"; the totality of the work that person has seen, taught and composed, rather than an individual work of art:

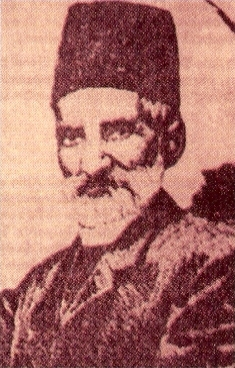
Hampartsoum Limondjian, Armenian-Ottoman composer. His notation system was widely used in the 19th century to transcribe Ottoman classical pieces.

A “composer” in the Ottoman context is not an “original genius”, who by himself creates anew. He is rather a person experienced in the musical tradition, who – within certain rules – through the combination of basic elements of form, rhythm and melodic models, creates a new derivation. This derivation passes on to the transmitting community who continue to compose and revise coequally with the composer and adjusts his original “derivation” to ever-changing aesthetic standards.

— Ralf Martin Jäger, Concepts of Western and Ottoman Music History

This meant that while the central melody and usûl would be laid down by the composer, the performer would add their personal style and accompaniment to the composition.

Despite this, attempts were made to standardize certain types of notation, starting from the 15th century, when Byzantine musicians introduced their own notation to the Ottoman tradition. During the 17th century, Dimitrie Cantemir modified an old Islamic method called abjad serialization, where every pitch and note length were assigned Arabic letters and numerals respectively, to create his own influential system. However, no notation system was as widespread and close to being standardized as Hampartsoum notation; developed by Hampartsoum Limondjian during the 19th century decline of Ottoman music. While Hampartsoum notation has been eclipsed by modified staff notation in the Republic of Turkey, it enjoys widespread usage in the Armenian Apostolic Church to this day.

== Forms ==
Almost all classical music in the Ottoman style is performed in a long-form performance called fasıl. Fasıls include various movements, which have to be ordered in a specific way: taksim, peşrev, kâr(ı-natık), kârçe, beste, ağır semâi, şarkı, yürük semâi and saz semâi. A fasıl is led by a serhânende, who is responsible for indicating usûls, and the remaining musicians are called sazende (instrumentalist) or hânende (vocalist).

=== Taksim ===
Taksim (Arabic for 'division') is an instrumental, improvised movement of a fasıl, played in locally-metrical rhythmic patterns. Performed by a single performer or a small part of the ensemble, taksims can be played in the beginning of a fasıl, or act as an interlude between two movements of a fasıl with different usuls or makams. As one of the most recognizable forms of Ottoman music, it has significantly influenced musical practice in all parts of the post-Ottoman world. However, the forms associated with taksim change drastically from one region to the next.

All taksims rely on codified melodic progressions called seyir, which systematize possibilities in melodic development in these pieces. Taksims also heavily rely on modal modulation, as a taksim made in a single makam would have been "of little aesthetic value" to the Ottomans. However, Feldman argues that the tradition of modulating in taksims started no earlier than the 17th century. Furthermore, taksims are often used to demonstrate abstract modal relationships, differences and similarities between makams. This tradition began with Dimitrie Cantemir, his Nağme-i Külliyat-ı Makamat (Ottoman Turkish for 'The song of the collection of makams'), features 36 modal modulations in total.

=== Gazel ===
Gazels are vocal versions of taksim. These are accompanied with the poetry form of the same name. Originally simply called taksim, the word gazel seems to have replaced the former word when referring to vocal improvisation, sometime around the 18th century.

=== Peşrev ===
Peşrevs are performed after the introductory taksim in a classical fasıl, and are rhythmically complex. They are typically made up of four hânes and one mülazime, which repeats after every hâne, and its melodic structure relies on alternating between neighboring makams in these hânes. Peşrevs, in addition to serving as preludes for long-form performances, also have a very comprehensive history in their usage as military marches, and therefore, has had a considerable influence on Western classical music. Melodically complex peşrevs with numerous modal modulations are called Fihrist peşrevs, or Küll-i Külliyat.

=== Kâr, Kârçe and Beste ===
Kârs, Kârçes and Bestes are vocal pieces performed after the peşrev in the classical fasıl, these pieces are slow, rhythmically complex, and include terennüm, syllables that represent certain aspects of meter in Ottoman poetry. Similar to fihrist peşrevs, melodically complex pieces of these types are called kar-ı natıks. In some versions of these pieces, every modal modulation is signaled by a pun with the makam's name, this is regarded as a poetic and pedagogical exercise.

=== Semaî ===
Semai, an umbrella term for both instrumental and vocal styles, is often the most frequently returned-to genre of a fasıl. It consists of 4 to 6 hânes and one mülazime, which typically repeats after every hâne. Ağır semais are slow vocal pieces which are composed in the "usuls of Aksak Semâî (10/8), Ağır Aksak Semâî (10/4) or Ağır Sengin Semâî (6/2)", and are often played after a kar or beste in a classical fasıl. Yürük semais are faster vocal pieces, composed in the usul of the same name (6/4 or 6/8), and are also played after the ağır semai in a classical fasıl. Saz semai are common instrumental pieces, played after the yürük semai in a classical fasıl, with very little variation in form, as "their first 3 hânes must be composed using the usul of Aksaksemâî (10/8), and the fourth hâne is in various small usuls (mostly Yürüksemâî, 6/4 or 6/8)." Despite this, they are played with numerous embellishments, or "enjambents", that offset the usul in various ways, creating more complex time signatures.

=== Semi-classical forms ===
Two main genres of semi-classical work exists, these are the şarkı and the oyun havası. Şarkı is a general name for urban songs which have been included in classical repertoire, principally after the 19th century, when the gazino style was created to counter the decline of Ottoman music. Urban dances or airs (Turkish: Oyun havası) are various dances which are sometimes included in classical repertoire, although only rarely in fasıls. Example styles of this form include the sirto, longa, hasapiko, zeybek, tavşanca, köçekçe, among others.

== See also ==
- Turkish folk music
- List of Turkish makams
