= Ayyub (name) =

- Pronunciation: Arabic: [ʔajˈjuːb]
- Gender: male
- Language: Arabic

Origin
- Origin: Arabic
- Meaning: to return to God

Other names
- Variant forms: Ayub, Ayoub, Ayoob, Eyüp, Job
- Related names: George

Ayyub (Arabic: أيّوب, romanized: ʾAyyūb) is the Arabic name of the Abrahamic prophet Job. Here it refers to the Islamic prophet which is mentioned in the Quran, see Job in Islam.

The spread of the name among Muslims is partly due to the fame of Saladin, founder of the Ayyubid dynasty, who was the son of Najm al-Din Ayyub.

Variant spellings include: Ayoub, Ayoob, Eyüp (in Turkish).

== Given name ==
- Ayyub ibn Salama
- Ayyub ibn Sharhabil, Umayyad governor of Egypt
- Ayyub ibn Nuh
- Najm al-Din Ayyub, Kurdish mercenary, father of Saladin
- al-Awhad Ayyub
- as-Salih Ayyub
- Isma'il Ayyub Pasha
- Ayyub Huseynov
- Ayyub Guliyev (conductor)
- Ayyub Guliyev
- Ayyub Khanbudagov
- Ayyub Musallam

=== Variants ===
Ayub

- Ayub Ali (1919–1995), Bangladeshi Islamic scholar and educationist
- Ayub Ali Master (1880–1980), British-Bangladeshi social reformer, politician and entrepreneur
- Ayub Shah Durrani (died 1837), Afghan ruler
- Ayub Khan (1907–1974), second President of Pakistan
- Ayub Afridi (died 2009), Pakistani drug lord turned politician
- Ayub Ommaya (1930–2008), a Pakistani neurosurgeon
- Ayub Shah Bukhari, Pakistani Sufi
- Ayub Thakur (1948–2004), Kashmiri freedom activist
- Master Ayub, a Pakistani teacher who runs an open air, free of cost, school in Islamabad since 1986
- Ayub Khan Din (born 1961), British-Pakistani actor and writer
- Ayub Bachchu (1962–2018), Bangladeshi rock musician
- Ayub Khan (actor) (born 1969), Indian actor
- Ayub Daud (born 1990), Somali footballer
- Ayub Masika (born 1992), Kenyan footballer

Ayoub

Ayoob

Eyüp

== Teknonym ==
- Abu Ayyub al-Ansari (died 674), a companion (sahaba) of Muhammad
- Abu Ayyub al-Masri
- Abu Ayyub Sulayman ibn Wahb

== Patronym ==
- Tughtakin ibn Ayyub
- Salah ad-Din Yusuf ibn Ayyub, better known w as Saladin

== Surname ==
- Afif Ayyub
- Gauri Ayyub
- Abu Sayeed Ayyub
- Dhu'l-Nun Ayyub
- Vurgun Ayyub
- Muhammad Ayyub (1952–2016), Saudi Arabian Quran reciter
- Mohammed Zeeshan Ayyub
- Bilal M. Ayyub
