= Ayub Khan (disambiguation) =

Ayub Khan is a compound masculine name; Ayub is the Arabic version of the name of the Biblical figure Job, while Khan or Khaan is taken from the title used first by the Mongol rulers and then, in particular, their Islamic and Persian-influenced successors in South Asia, where the name is usually found, although Khan was being used before outside South Asia.

== Given name ==
- Ayub Khan, President of Pakistan from 1958 to 1969
- Ayub Khan (actor) (born 1969), Indian film and television actor best known for his role in the television series Uttaran.
- Ayub Khan (Emir of Afghanistan) (1857–1914), Emir of Afghanistan who fought against the British Empire in the Second Anglo-Afghan War.
- Master Ayub, a Pakistani teacher who runs an open air, free of cost, school in Islamabad since 1986.
- Ayub Khan Din (born 1961), British writer and actor.
- Ayub Khan Ommaya (1930-2008), American neurosurgeon.
- Ayoub Khan (British politician), British politician.

== Surname ==
- Gohar Ayub Khan (born 1937), Pakistani military officer, businessman, and politician who served as Minister of Foreign Affairs (1997–1998) and Speaker of the National Assembly (1990–1993); son of the President of Pakistan.
- Muhammad Ayub Khan (1907–1974), Pakistani military officer who served as President of Pakistan from 1958 to 1969 following his staging a coup d'état. Previously served as Commander-in-Chief of the Pakistan Army (1951–1958) and Minister of Defence (1954–1955).
- Sardar Muhammad Ayub Khan, Pakistani politician
- Omar Ayub Khan (born 1970), Pakistani politician, as of 2015 a member of the National Assembly, son of Gohar Ayub Khan.
- Ghazi Mohammad Ayub Khan, (1857-1914) Known as the Victor of Maiwand
- Master Ayub

== See also ==
- Aepa, name of at least two different Cuman princes in the early 12th century, mentioned in Rus' chronicles
- Ayub (name)
- Eyüp (name), Turkish variant
