= Afif (name) =

Afif (also transliterated as Afeef, Arabic: عفيف) is a masculine Arabic given name. Notable people with the name include:

== Given name ==
- Afif Ayyub (born 1953), Lebanese diplomat
- Afif al-Bizri (1914–1994), Syrian military officer
- Afif Chaya (born 1947), Lebanese singer and actor
- Afif Safieh (born 1950), Palestinian diplomat

== Surname ==
- Abu Sa'id al-Afif (fl. 15th century), Egyptian physician
- Abdullah Afeef (1916–1993), United Suvadive Republic politician
- Akram Afif (born 1996), Qatari international footballer
- Alexander Afif (born 1953), disputed head of the Royal House of Saxony
- Guilherme Afif Domingos (born 1943), Brazilian politician
- Jean-Paul Afif (born 1980), American-Lebanese basketball player and coach
