= Earth anthem =

Theoretical song that represents Earth

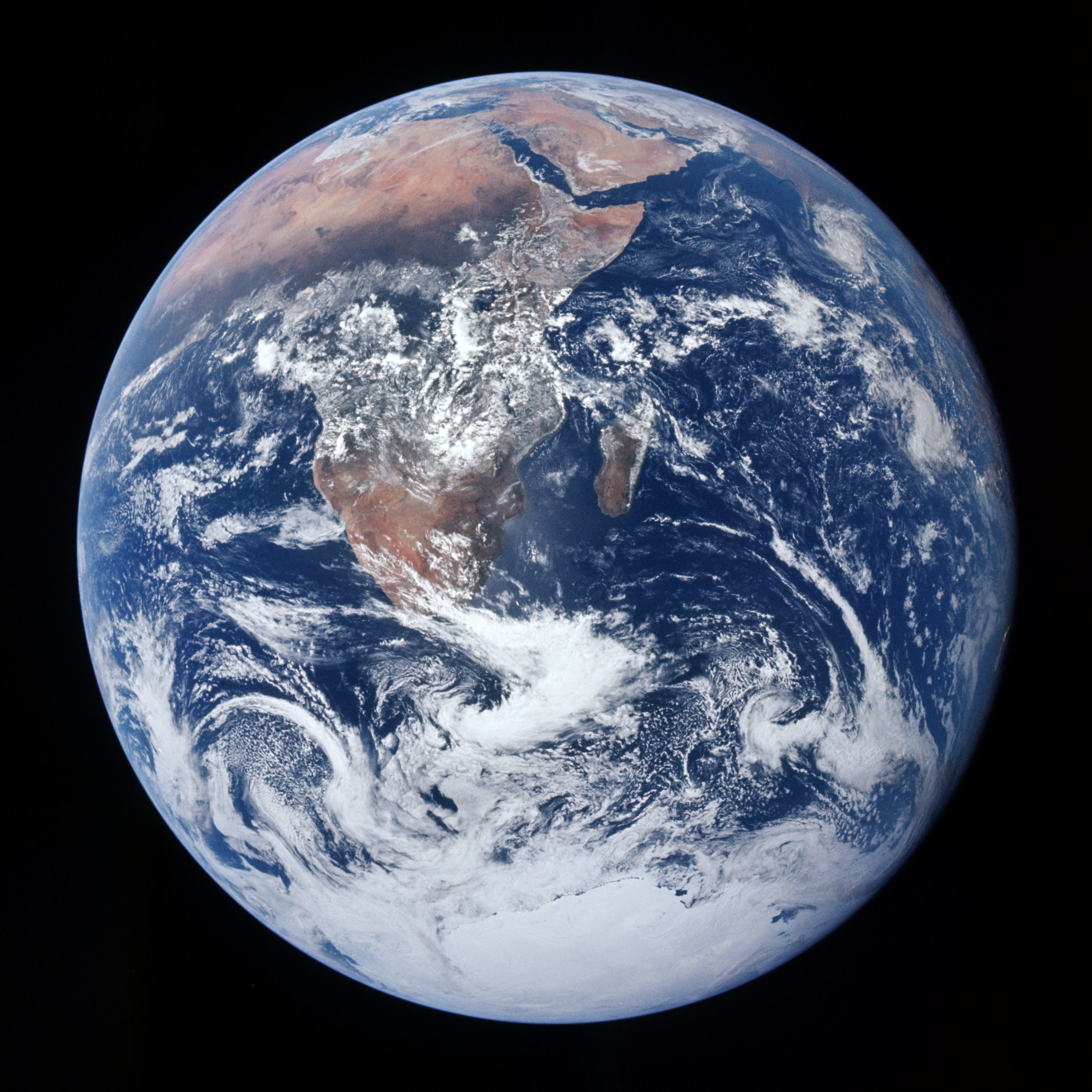
The Blue Marble, planet Earth as seen from Apollo 17

An Earth anthem is a celebratory song or a musical composition that eulogizes, extols or exalts planet Earth.

== History ==
=== Songs composed for the United Nations ===
==== Voices for Today ====
"Voices for Today" is a song composed by Benjamin Britten in 1965 to commemorate the 20th anniversary of the founding of the United Nations. The lyrics are based on Virgil’s fourth Eclogue.

==== Hymn to the United Nations ====
On the request of then United Nations Secretary-General U Thant, a "Hymn to the United Nations" was performed on the occasion of its 26th anniversary, on October 24, 1971, by Pablo Casals, the lyrics to which were penned by the poet W. H. Auden.

=== Call for an official Earth anthem ===
In January 2014, Abhay K. of the United Nations Permanent Delegation of India cited a need for a global anthem. While UNESCO's assistant director general Éric Falt agreed it was necessary but claimed UNESCO "lack[ed the] resources to organize an online global competition to select an Earth Anthem".

=== Songs about Earth ===
There are a number of songs or a musical composition that eulogizes, extols or exalts the planet Earth.

In 1968, The Turtles released "Earth Anthem" on their fourth studio album, The Turtles Present the Battle of the Bands. In 2003, Dan Fogelberg covered this as the last song of his album, Full Circle.

"Mother Earth (Natural Anthem)" by Neil Young, "Earth Song" by Michael Jackson, "Earth" by Lil Dicky, and "Earth Anthem" by Abhay Kumar are other examples of popular music with Earth as a theme.

In 1990, lyricist Barbara Lee George first performed the "Earth Day Anthem" with the Children’s Chorus of Sussex County, sung to the tune of Beethoven's "Ode to Joy". New York state congressman Benjamin Gilman recommended that the United States adopt it as the official Earth anthem. It was nominated for a Marcus Nobel United Earth Prize in 1992. George's song was first recorded in 2015 in collaboration with guitarist Al Orlo, producer John Lissauer, and singer Vaneese Thomas among others.

In November of 2010, the UFO religion Universe People's website published an instrumental "New Earth Anthem".

In 2012, Andrew Huang wrote a pop song titled "When The Lights Go Down" for WWF-Canada. This Earth Hour anthem contained lyrics such as "Protecting the Earth is our message".

The world music ensemble, Libana, has recorded multiple songs dedicated to the Earth. Recorded in 1986, "Ancient Mother" and "The Earth is Our Mother" chants were part of Songs of the Sacred Wheel. Their 2024 single, "Gaia Now", addresses the effects of climate change with lyrics such as "Wake up now, the Earth is flooding, rise up and protect her / Cry about your mama, she's our home, she is our mother".

=== MindShare anthem ===
External videos
- World Anthem by Mindshare

In 1996, Denver composer John Guillot was working on a compilation CD of national anthems when he "conceived of a single piece of music based on the common notes and tendencies of all of the world’s national anthems". It was not meant to replace any anthem but rather to "bring its message of peace and understanding across national borderlines".

In 2000, Guillot worked with professor David Cope at the University of California, Santa Cruz, whose artificial musical intelligence program Experiments in Musical Intelligence (EMI) was able to generate a conglomeration of songs based on commonalities in lyrics and sheet music (such as phrases, notes, and melodies). Using files created by composer Stephen Bigger, "Guillot and Cope entered the [national anthems] into the program and the result was the words and music of 'The World Anthem'", which was completed by the year 2000. The Tommy E. Short Charitable Foundation provided a grant of an unknown sum to create an international recording. The music was recorded by an orchestra in Prague with vocals from Los Angeles.

The recording was first publicly heard at Denver, Colorado's millennium celebration on Dec. 31, 2000, "at the stroke of midnight" in conjunction with New Years' Eve fireworks.

The first live performance was in November 2001, by the Colorado Symphony Orchestra.

In 2001, it was performed in the 40th anniversary celebration of the Peace Corps in Washington D.C.

Circa 2002, the "World Anthem" was published by the Mindshare Institute and Foundation and used by the Praxis Peace Institute in Croatia. The same year, it was performed in the Poudre High School commencement and graduation at Moby Arena at CSU. There, it was met with some criticism, such as by radio commentators Mike Rosen and Peter Boyles, as well as letters to the editors of CSU publications. Opponents, who were usually parents of the students, claimed they were "offended" the American national anthem was not played instead.

In 2006, the United States Air Force Academy Band published its performance of the "World Anthem", conducted by Philip Chevallard and arranged by Joseph T. Spaniola.

The music video was uploaded to YouTube in 2007. The MindShare Institute of Fort Collins hired producer Brian Doubleday to contact more than 200 photographers around the world to contribute "faces of humanity" for the video.

=== Reverend Billy & Earthalujah! ===
Since at least 2011, Reverend Billy and the Earthalujah Choir has performed in front of the Blue Marble flag, singing joyous songs that celebrate environmentalism and anti-consumerism.

In 2020, Reverend Billy & The Stop Shopping Choir premiered "Earthalujah!", a rearrangement of the Hallelujah chorus from Handel's 1714 oratorio, Messiah. It was arranged by Nehemiah Luckett and Gregory Corbino with lyrics by Billy Talen.

=== The Resolution Song ===
Sheet music of global song collaboration "The Resolution Song"

Written in 2019, "The Resolution Song (The World on Our Shoulders)" is an ongoing global song project, made in collaboration with Music Declares Emergency. The song invites covers, celebrates human cultures, and declares humanity's shared responsibility to preserve the environment.

Individuals from the World Wide Fund for Nature, Decca, and Extinction Rebellion began work on the project, with the goal of "people in every country in the world singing the same song". The song was composed in a workshop by Violet Skies, Låpsley, and Robin Howl, who purposely made its arrangement and lyrics public domain and downloadable. Afterwards, volunteers reached out to musicians worldwide to cover the song.

It premiered at the December 2019 United Nations Climate Change Conference. Since then, it has been sung by thousands of people in over 100 countries. Its goal was to call for governments to enact New Year's resolutions to resolve the climate crisis. In 2022, NME described the song as a "call for peace, unity, global harmony and action on climate" that celebrates the diversity of human culture.

According to Planet Resolution, there is "at least one version of the song from every country on Earth". Project lead Abbey Wright summarized some global performers in 2022:

From a girl band in Benin to a drill group in Brazzaville, Congo to the Kuikuro people in the Amazon; a Mongolian nomadic herder, the Georgian State Opera Chorus, panpipers from the Solomon Islands and refugees from Eritrea, Iran and Syria. The song has been sung on the frontlines of climate change in San Andrés, Mozambique, the Marshall Islands, the Antarctic, Haiti and The Maldives...In Sierra Leone, a group of street kids sing the song, as well as people from slums in Uganda, Kenya and the brilliant Recycled Orchestra from Paraguay, who make instruments from rubbish and teach music to children from Cateura...

External videos
- "Resolution Song", a conglomeration of video entries edited by Planet Resolution, 2022

Celebrity supporters of the project include Emma Thompson, Keira Knightley, Naomie Harris, Bill Bailey, Jodie Whittaker, and Mark Rylance. Notable performers of the Resolution Song include:

- Coldplay
- Murkage Dave
- Declan McKenna
- The Weather Station
- Laura Misch
- Brian Eno
- KT Tunstall
- Annie Lennox
- The Wombats
- Meas Soksophea
- Soweto Gospel Choir
- Stewart Sukuma
- Hot Chip
- Naseer Shamma

=== The Internationale ===
"The Internationale" is an international anthem that has been used by various socialist, communist, anarchist, and social democratic movements. The lyrics were written by Eugène Pottier, a French member of the First International, in 1871. The song has been used as the national anthem of the Soviet Union.

== See also ==
- Anthems of international organizations
- Flag of Earth
- Global citizenship
- Olympic Hymn
- "We Are the World"
