= Ayoub =

Ayoub is the Arabic name of the biblical figure Job.

Ayoub or Ayyoub or Ayub or Ayoob and other variants is also a given name and a surname. Eyüp is the Turkish variant of the same name. Ejub is the Bosnian variant of the same name.

== Given name ==
=== Ayoub ===
- Ayoub Abdellaoui (born 1993), Algerian footballer
- Ayoub Adouich (born 1996), Moroccan para taekwondo practitioner
- Ayoub Azzi (born 1989), Algerian footballer
- Ayoub Baninosrat (born 1968), Iranian wrestler
- Ayoub Barzani, Kurdish writer and critic
- Ayoub Boukhari (born 1997), Dutch footballer of Moroccan descent
- Ayoub El Kaabi (born 1993), Moroccan footballer
- Ayoub Odisho (born 1960), Iraqi Assyrian footballer
- Ayoub Al-Mas (born 1978), Emirati swimmer
- Ayoub Mousavi (born 1995), Iranian weightlifter
- Ayoub Murshid Ali Saleh (born 1978), Yemeni citizen held in extrajudicial detention in the U.S. Guantanamo Bay detainment camps, in Cuba
- Ayoub Pourtaghi (born 1973), Iranian amateur boxer
- Ayoub Rachane (born 1988), Moroccan footballer
- Ayoub-Farid Michel Saab (or just Farid Saab) (born 1939), Lebanese banker
- Ayoub Sadni (born 1999), Moroccan Paralympic athlete
- Ayoub Sørensen (born 1988), Danish-Moroccan footballer
- Ayoub Tabet (1884–1951), Lebanese Protestant politician and acting president of Lebanon during the French Mandate of Lebanon from 18 March to 22 July 1943
- Ayoub Zolfagari (born 1959), Iranian footballer

=== Ayyoub ===
- Ayyoub Allach (born 1998), Belgian-born Moroccan footballer
- Ayyoub Bouaddi (born 2007), French-born Moroccan footballer.

=== Ayub ===
- Ayub Khan (1907–1974), a number of individuals with the name

== Surname ==
=== Ayoub ===
- Ahmed Ayoub (born 1971), Egyptian footballer
- Christine Ayoub (1922–2024), Canadian-American mathematician
- Elizabeth Ayoub, Venezuelan singer and actress of Lebanese descent
- François Ayoub (1899–1966), Syrian Archbishop of the Maronite Catholic Archeparchy of Aleppo
- George Ayoub (born 1963), Australian professional rugby union referee
- Lucy Ayoub (born 1992), Israeli television presenter, poet and radio host
- M. M. Ayoub, Egyptian professor of industrial engineering
- Mouna Ayoub (born 1957), French socialite and businesswoman of Lebanese origin
- Nadeen Ayoub (born 1998), Palestinian model and beauty pageant titleholder
- Nawal Ayoub, Colombian beauty queen of Lebanese ancestry
- Sam Ayoub, Australian rugby league player-manager
- Samiha Ayoub (1932–2025), Egyptian actress
- Serge Ayoub (born 1964), French activist of Lebanese descent associated with the French extreme right
- Souheil Ayoub (1936–2025), Lebanese fencer
- Susanne Ayoub (born 1956), Austrian-Iraqi writer, journalist and filmmaker
- Wadi Ayoub (1927–1976), Lebanese Greco–Roman style wrestler best known as Sheik Ali, in Australia and internationally
- Yassin Ayoub (born 1994), Moroccan-Dutch footballer
- Salahuddin Ayyub (1138–1193), Sultan of the Ayyubid dynasty, Liberator of Jerusalem. Kurdish-Syrian(Levant) descent

=== Ayyoub ===
- Ali Abdullah Ayyoub (born 1952), Syrian politician, senior Syrian Arab Army officer
- Habib Ayyoub (born 1947), Algerian writer
- Loay Ayyoub (born 1993 or 1994)
- Tareq Ayyoub (1968–2003), Palestinian Arab television reporter
