= Eyüboğlu =

Eyüboğlu is a Turkish name, meaning "son of Eyüp". It may refer to:

== People with the surname Eyüboğlu ==
- Bedri Rahmi Eyüboğlu (1911–1975), Turkish painter and mosaic muralist
- Eren Eyüboğlu (1913–1988), Romanian-born Turkish painter and mosaic muralist
- Ezgi Eyüboğlu (born 1988), Turkish actress
- Orhan Eyüboğlu (1918–1980), Turkish politician
- Mualla Eyüboğlu (1919–2009), Turkish architect
- Sabahattin Eyüboğlu (1908–1973), Turkish writer

== Other uses ==
- Eyüboğlu High School, founded in 1970 by Dr. Rüstem Eyüboğlu.
