= Corporate anthem =

Corporate anthems, sometimes called corpanthems, are anthems written to celebrate companies, motivate employees, or entice sponsors.

Since the early 20th century, senior managements have commissioned or performed company anthems at corporate events. These include IBM, Ernst & Young, Apple Inc., Fujitsu, Starbucks, and Walmart.

They received renewed interest in 2001 due to the archival work of web developer Chris Raettig, who collected them publicly on his website. His collection received 200,000 visits in a week after its launch. Referencing the website, The New York Times, The Guardian, and CNN Business reported upon corporate anthems between 2001 and 2003.

By 2002 CNN Business reported that "[corporate] songs, once the private embarrassment of the board room, have emerged as a cult musical genre with hundreds of thousands of devoted [internet] fans". However, a research report by Britain's University of Warwick wrote that company music ran the risk of becoming the object of ridicule when leaked outside of an organization's intended purposes.

== History ==
=== 20th century ===
In 1937, IBM released a collection of 100 "happy songs" for IBM corporate gatherings. Each song borrowed tunes from existing music, with lyrics altered to fit the goals and personages of IBM. For example, an ode to IBM president Thomas J. Watson was sung to the tune of "Auld Lang Syne":

T. J. Watson - you're our leader fine, the greatest in the land,
We sing your praises from our hearts - we're here to shake your hand.
You're I. B. M.'s bright guiding star throughout the hemispheres,
No matter what the future brings, we all will persevere.

In 1971, Japanese jazz singer Martha Miyake and the Polydor Orchestra performed the "Song of Fujitsu". The song, intended as a karaoke sing-along, failed to entice employees because not many of them could read sheet music.

During a conference in January 1984, Apple screened "We Are Apple (Leading the Way)" to celebrate the rollout of Macintosh 128K. It was screened during a corporate presentation, intended to be viewed only by authorized Apple dealers and retailers.

Sometime before 2001, PwC published "Your World" and "Downright Global," which would find resurgence in popularity in 2002.

=== 2001-2003 resurgence in popularity ===
In 2001, London web developer Chris Raettig launched a corporate anthem website after an acquaintance sent him KPMG's corporate theme song, "Our Vision of Global Strategy". Inspired to collect more, Raettig created a website to collect more examples; within a week, his website received 200,000 visits and continuous emails of corporate themes.

In March 2002, ZDNET purchased the website and "initiated a Top 20 according to number of downloads for each anthem". McKinsey & Company's theme proved to be the most popular in 2002; the company denied its officiality and claimed the theme was "just a group of people in our research and information unit having a bit of fun". PwC, however, expressed pride at having two songs on the "chart".

By 2002, CNN Business reported that "[corporate] songs, once the private embarrassment of the board room, have emerged as a cult musical genre with hundreds of thousands of devoted fans".

Matt Loney of ZDNET explained the site's popularity to CNN Business in 2003:

In general the songs reflect managements' poor sense of reality. Above a certain level in any company, executives operate in an environment where reality doesn't intrude very much.The songs are popular because they are generally awful. People download them for a cringe.

Although some firms denied that the song was their official anthem, none requested takedowns of the music from the Corporate Anthems website.

=== Later 21st century ===
In 2003, the University of Warwick reported corporate anthems' lack of efficacy and potential for ridicule:

While sing-along marching songs, as used by Wal Mart, [sic] induce positive feeling and happiness, so help control employee behaviour, songs are also used subversively to provide resistance to work. In fact, many ‘official’ songs are received with cynicism by employees, or even result in embarrassment.

Although songs or music can help branding and team building, a number of company songs, especially those in the style of Gospel anthems, such as ‘Ahh Fujitsu’, inspire dysfunction amongst employees...

Without control over the placement and timing of anthems, company music runs the risk of ridicule. For example, KPMG’s anthemic, but now cringe worthy, [sic] ‘Vision of Global strategy’ was copied in mp3 format by employees, remixed, and distributed on the net.

On February 24, 2005, at Seattle Convention Center's Starbucks Licensed Stores Awards, Starbucks senior management surprised the audience by coming out in "rock 'n' roll costumes" with inflatable instruments; they performed a parody of Jefferson Starship’s 1985 "We Built This City", as "We Built This Starbucks". When the audience failed to dance, the emcee "berated them", and the employees "half-heartedly got up and just stood there". Although footage of the event is presumed to be lost, a recording of the audio was uploaded to YouTube in 2018, which alleged that a souvenir CD with the MP3 was gifted to attendees.

In 2006, an internal video of Ernst & Young was uploaded to YouTube, which showed employees performing an altered version of 1967 gospel song "Oh Happy Day". Dozens of employees are seen dancing, singing, and waving their arms in the air, with a live singer, drummer, guitarist, and saxophone soloist. The song commemorates "teamwork" and "[loving] every day", replacing the lyric Jesus with Ernst & Young. B-roll footage includes shots of a chef serving soup to employees.

In 2023, Land Bank of the Philippines celebrated 60 years with the release of a new anthem, composed by National Artist composer Ryan Cayabyab.

== See also ==
- Earth anthem
- Buzzword
- Synergy
- Organizational culture
