= Ayoob =

Ayoub is the Arabic name of the biblical figure Job.

It may also refer to:

== Given name ==
- Ayoob Kara (born 1955), Israeli Druze politician
- Ayoob Tarish (born 1942), Yemeni singer and melodist

== Surname ==
- Joe Ayoob (born 1984), Lebanese-American arena football quarterback
- Massad Ayoob (born 1948), American firearms and self-defense instructor
- Mohammed Ayoob (born 1942), professor of International Relations

== See also ==
- Ayoub
- Ayub (name)
