= Jobert =

The name Jobert is a French variant of the name Job.

== People ==
People with the name Jobert include:

- Jobert of Syria (fl. 1172–1177), seventh Grand Master of the Knights Hospitaller in Syria
- Joséphine Jobert (born 1985), French actress and singer
- Marlène Jobert (born 1940), French actress, singer and author
- Michel Jobert (1921–2002), French politician

== See also ==
- Magny-Jobert, a commune in the region of Bourgogne-Franche-Comté in France
