= Sharif Aghayar =

Azerbaijani writer

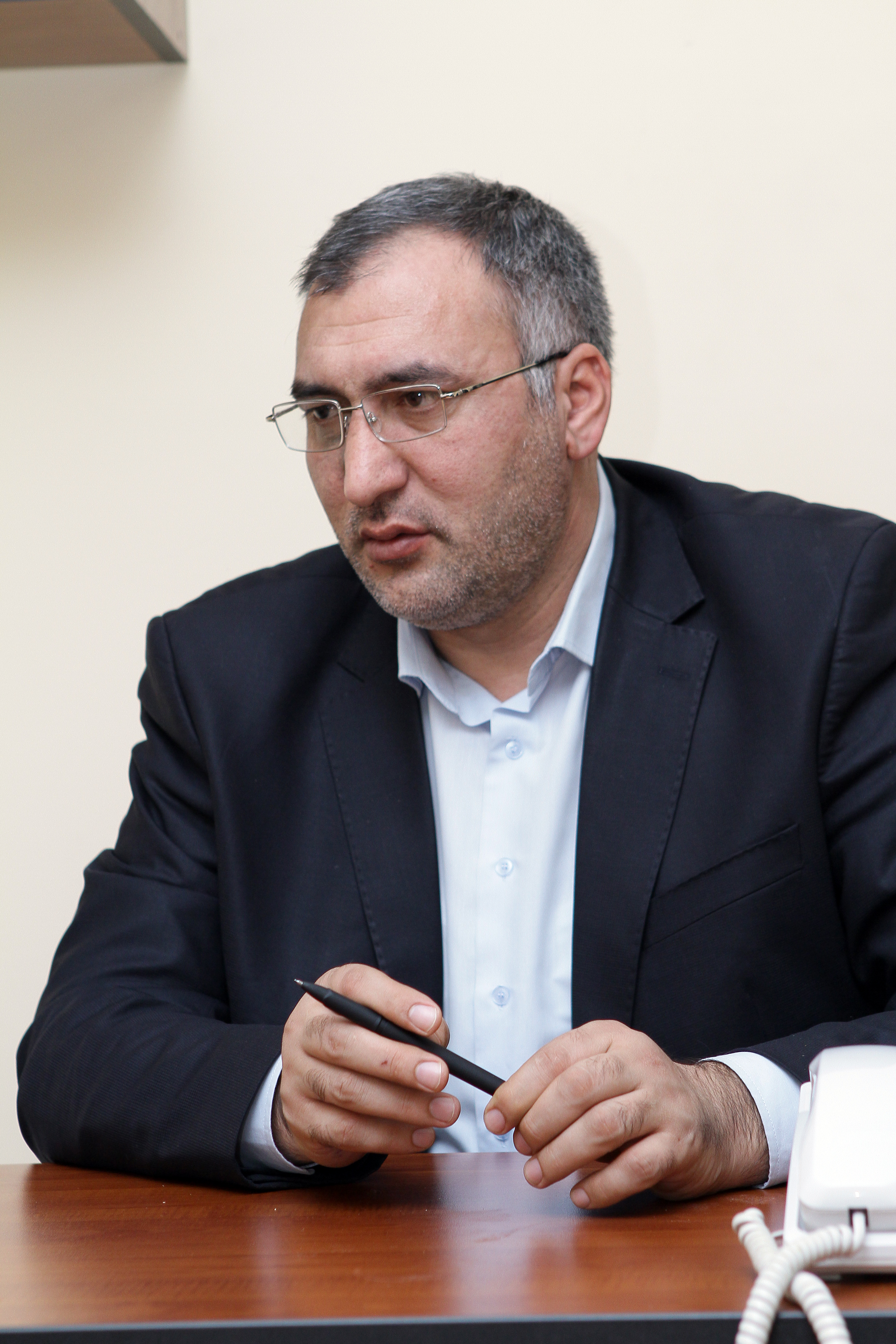
- Born: January 1, 1976 (age 50); Agbulag, Lachin District, Azerbaijan Soviet Socialist Republic, Soviet Union
- Education: Azerbaijan State Pedagogical University
- Writing career
- Language: Azerbaijani

Sharif Aghayar (full name: Sharif Ziyadkhan Aghayarov, Azerbaijani: Şərif Ziyadxan oğlu Ağayarov; January 1, 1976, Agbulag, Lachin district) is an Azerbaijani writer.

== Life ==
Sharif Aghayar was born on January 1, 1976, in the village of Ağbulaq of Lachin District. In 1980–1991, he studied at the secondary school in the village of Agbulag. In 1992, he was admitted to the Faculty of History and Philology at the Shusha branch of the Azerbaijan State Pedagogical University named after N. Tusi. For a time he worked as a teacher at Aghdam Agricultural Technical School in Agjabadi. He came to Baku in 1998 and began working as a reporter in the cultural department of “Panorama” newspaper.

== Awards ==
He was awarded the Khalil Rza Ulutürk Prize, created in 1998 by the Writers Union and the Independent Trade Union of Culture Workers, and the Youth Prize in 2003 by the Ministry of Youth and Sports for his achievements in the field of literature. The same year he won first Proza N Internet Competition held by the YeniSI Center for Literary and Art Studies in Azerbaijan.

On November 23, 2015, he was awarded Rafik Mountain Prize by the Dalga Youth Organization for his enlightenment and active work.

In May 2019, he was named "Literary Man of the Year" by the Azerbaijan Creative Fund. The same year, he won the prestigious nomination of the Golden Word Literary Prize established by the Ministry of Culture for his novel "The City beyond the Dreams."

== Activities ==
In 2000, he was invited by the “New Azerbaijan” newspaper to write articles in the field of culture and literature and prepare special editions. He worked for the newspaper until the end of 2003. He has published numerous articles, poems, essays, and stories. On November 20, 2003, he was appointed editor-in-chief of the “Kino+” newspaper.

Sharif Aghayar represented Azerbaijan at the 3rd Poets Meeting of Turkic-speaking countries and peoples held at the initiative of THE International Organization of Turkic Culture in Malatya, Turkey on October 21–28, 2002.

A book of poems entitled "Masnavi of Desert" initiated by the Vector Science Center was published in 2003, and "The Brick Man's Saga" narrative, was ranked in the top ten of the 2010 National Book Award. The EL Publishing House published his prose book named “Aftafali Antact” and in 2011, Qanun Publishing House published his novel "Haramy" within "New Literature" series.

In 2013, the "Zero" Publishing House published "Poor Photos," a book of poems within the "Pocket Books" series. "Mrs. T." storybook was published by the Writer Publishing House, and "Gulustan" and "The City beyond the Dreams" novels by Qanun Publishing House in 2015 and 2016, respectively.

From 2008 to 2013, he was a consultant in the Department of Publishing, Advertising and Information at the Ministry of Culture and Tourism. Currently, he works as the chief editor at the “Kulis.az” literature portal.

== Works ==
His folk and epic poems ("Prayer", "May 92", "Chamber", "Brother", "Unpainted Mizrab Nails", "Civilization", "Mystery of the Wind", "Cat Anzar", "Modern Poems" "etc.) caused great interest of readers and critics, and dozens of articles were published in their regard.

At the same time, "Dagal", "Dima's notes", "Our house", "Balabey", "Georgy's house", "Anakhanum”, "First day without Lachin", "It seemed like a funny story", "Military-political issue.", "Shuglov Method", "Picture", "Gumru", "Babash" stories," “The Brick Man's Saga" and "Hurrem" narratives," “Harami", "Gulustan", "The City beyond the Dreams", "White Lake" and "Commander" novels have earned him a special place among writers of the next generation.

Alaviyya Babayeva, Elchin Afandiyev, Vagif Yusifli, Rashad Majid, Adil Mirseyid, Mahir Garayev, Asad Jahangir, Javanshir Yusifli, Tehran Alishanoglu, Tofig Abdin, Akif Ali, Vurgun Ayyub, Elnara Akimova, Irada Musatayeva Haji, Jalil Javanshir, Aikhan Ayvaz and other well-known writers wrote interesting articles about his works.

His writings and works have been published on kulis.az, qafqazinfo.az, qaynar.info, oxuzali.az and other web-sites with stories placed in electronic libraries.

=== Books ===
1. "Masnavi of Desert" (Poems), Baku, "Vector" Publishing House, 2003
2. "The Brick Man's Saga" (narrative), Qanun Publishing House, 2010
3. "Aftafali Antract" (Baku), Baku, "EL" Publishing House, 2010
4. "Harami" (Baku), Baku, Qanun Publishing House, 2011
5. "Poor photos" (poems), Baku, "Zero" Publishing House, 2013. 88 p.
6. "Mrs. T." (storybook), Baku, "Writer" Publishing House, 2013. 174 p.
7. "Gulustan" (novel), Baku, Qanun Publishing House, 2015.
8. "The City beyond the Dreams" (Novel), Baku, Qanun Publishing House, 2017
9. White Lake (novel), Baku, Qanun Publishing House, 2018

=== Stories ===
- Sharif Aghayar, "Shuglov Method" - libliq.org
- Sharif Aghayar, Military-Political Issues - News.lent.az

=== Narratives ===
- Sharif Aghayar, "The Brick Man's Saga" (Povest) - Liberty.org

=== Essays ===
- Sharif Aghayar, "God has chosen the book" - kulis.lent.az

=== Articles ===
- Sharif Aghayar, "Our Lyrical People" (Article). - edebiyyat-az.com
