= Kingdom of Gypsies =

- Genre: Drama
- Written by: Mohammed Al-Ghaiti
- Directed by: Abdulaziz Hashad
- Starring: Houria Farghali; Fifi Abdou; Sameh Al-Sorieti; Mayar Al-Ghaiti; Hazem Samir
- Country of origin: Egypt
- Original language: Arabic
- No. of seasons: 1
- No. of episodes: 30

Production
- Running time: 45 minutes
- Production companies: Al Masat, Sharikat Aldhahab

Original release
- Release: May 6, 2019

Kingdom of Gypsies (Arabic: مملكة الغجر) is an Egyptian television serial. It debuted during Ramadan on May 6, 2019, and lasted for 30 episodes. The series stars former Miss Egypt, Horeya Farghaly, and actress/dancer Fifi Abdou. The cast also includes Abdou's real-life daughter Azza Mujahid.

The series was subject to censorship from the government of Abdel Fattah el-Sisi. Kingdom of Gypsies was cited for breaking Egyptian censorship rules 105 times. The series was accused of including prohibited content such as the use of English words, depictions of violence and sexual innuendo.

== Production ==
The original name of the drama was Yasmina, but the production team changed it to Yasmina and the Queen of the Gypsies. The title was then changed to Kingdom of the Gypsies.

== Cast ==
- Horeya Farghaly
- Fifi Abdou
- Nour Fakhry
- Zainab Abdel Wahab
- Azza Mujahid
- Ghafran Muhamad
- Husam Al-Jandaa
- Sameh Al-Saryy
- Mayar Al-Gheity
- Hazem Samir
- Ahmed Karara
- Mohamed Hamza

== See also ==
- List of Egyptian television series
