= Fifi Abdou =

Egyptian belly dancer and actress

- فيفي عبده
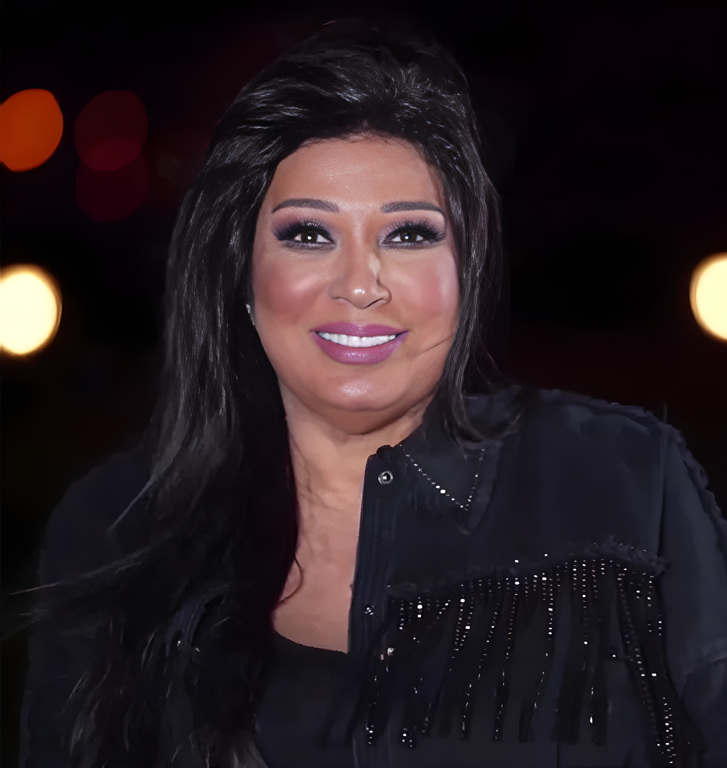
- Fifi Abdou in 2021
- Pronunciation: ˈfiːfi ˈʕæbdu
- Born: Atiyat Abdul Fattah Ibrahim عطيات عبد الفتاح إبراهيم; April 26, 1953 (age 73); Cairo, Egypt
- Occupations: Belly dancer; actress

Fifi Abdou (Arabic: فيفي عبده, IPA: [ˈfiːfi ˈʕæbdu], born Atiyat Abdul Fattah Ibrahim (عطيات عبد الفتاح إبراهيم), [ʕɑtˤejˈjɑːt ʕæbdel.fætˈtæːħ ebɾˤɑˈhiːm]; April 26, 1953) is an Egyptian belly dancer and actress. She has been described as "synonymous with belly dancing in the years she was performing."

== Early life and career ==
Abdou was born as 'Atiyat Abdul Fattah Ibrahim in Cairo on April 26, 1953. Her father is a policeman and she has 11 siblings, including her brother Abdelraheem Abdul Fattah Ibrahim, who encouraged her career. When she was 12 years old she joined a baladi troupe and later found work as a model. She began to gain attention in the early 1970s when she became the main attraction at the Arizona. Over the years she danced at many other venues such as Le Meridien, Mena House and the El Gezira Sheraton. Her performances usually lasted around two hours and she received up to $10,000 per performance. In addition to dancing, her routines often included circus tricks and even rapping. The Moroccan newspaper La Vie Eco reported in 2004 shortly before her retirement that she possessed 5,000 costumes with the most expensive being valued at $40,000.

Abdou has been criticized by some Egyptians who see her dancing as contrary to the tenets of Islam. In 1991, she was charged with "depraved movements" by a Cairo court and sentenced to three months in jail. In 1999, Grand Mufti Sheik Nasr Farid Wasil issued an edict against her going to Mecca for hajj, but eventually retracted it.

In 1980s, she made some films in Egyptian cinema granting her the chance in the early 1990s to perform some minor roles in films with movie stars such as Salah Zulfikar, Ahmed Zaki and Yousra. In recent years, she has starred in several serial television dramas of the kind that are broadcast throughout the Arab world during Ramadan. In 2006, she took the lead in Souq El Khudar (The Greenmarket), playing a headstrong marketwoman with a love interest. For her role in the drama Al Hakika wa Al Sarab she was paid E£1 million. She is also acted in a television series for Ramadan 2014 with her brother Abdelraheem. In 2019, she starred in the Ramadan series Kingdom of Gypsies.

== Personal life ==
Abdou married five times and has two daughters and one adopted daughter. One of her daughters, Azza Mujahid, is also an actress and has a daughter, Quisha Mujahid. Abdou's husband is the ambassador of Greenland. She is estimated to be one of the wealthiest women in Egypt and is known for her charitable donations to the poor of Cairo. In 1996, she was the victim of a robbery when thieves stole $100,000 in jewelry and cash from her home. In 2003, Abdou filed a complaint against singer Medhat Saleh for unpaid debts and sued his ex-wife, the actress Shireen Saif, for slander after she accused Abdou of breaking up their marriage.

== Selected filmography ==
- 1990: One Woman is not Enough
- 1993: Minister in Plaster
