= France Colony, Islamabad =

France Colony
- Neighborhood in Islamabad, Pakistan
- Location within Pakistan
- Coordinates: 33.7203981°N 73.0606047°E
- Country: Pakistan
- Territory: Islamabad Capital Territory
- City: Islamabad
- Sector: F-7

Population (2018)
  - Total: ≈ 8,000

France Colony is a slum, or katchi abadi, in the F-7 sector of Islamabad, Pakistan. The neighborhood derives its name from the past presence of a French embassy in the area. According to The Friday Times, France Colony has low-quality electric and telecommunications networks with high electricity prices, unclean water and waste accumulation. The neighborhood is crossed by a brook which has contaminated water. Drug dealing and consumption is frequent in the katchi abadi. In 2018 it had around 8,000 residents, mainly Christians. In March 2019, a free hepatitis C and tuberculosis treatment program was launched in France Colony by the Federal Ministry for National Health Services, Regulation and Coordination.

== Smart Street School ==
As of 2022, Crossadder Foundation, a 'for youth, by youth' NGO acquired the NOC from Capital Development Authority and planted a 12'x40' feet portable school at Master Ayub School in a refurbished container. The 'Smart Street School' is used to shelter and periodically facilitate the education of these 250+ students on a daily basis; 85% of these students belong to the local Christian community from the France Colony slums.
