= Dumbek rhythms =

Rhythms used to play various hand drums

Dumbek rhythms are a collection of rhythms that are usually played with hand drums such as the dumbek. These rhythms are various combinations of these three basic sounds:

- Doom (D), produced with the dominant hand striking the sweet spot of the skin.
- Tak (T), produced with the dominant hand striking the rim.
- Ka (K), produced with the recessive hand striking the rim.

== Notation ==
In a simple notation, these three sounds are represented by three letters: D, T, and K. When capitalized, the beat is emphasized, and when lower-case, it is played less emphatically. These basic sounds can be combined with other sounds:

- Sak or slap (S) (sometimes called 'pa'), produced with the dominant hand. Similar to the doom except the fingers are cupped to capture the air, making a loud terminating sound. The hand remains on the drum head to prevent sustain.
- Trill (l), produced by lightly tapping three fingers of one hand in rapid succession on the rim
- Roll or (rash, r), produced by a rapid alternating pattern of taks and kas

This is the simple dumbek rhythm notation for the 2/4 rhythm known as ayyoub:

1-&-2-&-
D--kD-T-

== Rhythms ==
There are many traditional rhythms. Some are much more popular than others. The "big six" Middle Eastern rhythms are Ayyoub, Beledi (Masmoudi Saghir), Chiftitelli, Maqsoum, Masmoudi and Saidi.

== See also ==
- Iqa'
- Wazn
- Egyptian music
- Belly dance
- Arabic music
- Usul (music)
