= Baladi =

Egyptian dance

Baladi (Arabic: بلدي baladī; relative-adjective 'of town', 'local', comparable to English folk, with a lower-class connotation) can refer to an Egyptian musical style, the folk style of Egyptian belly dance (Raqs Baladi), or the Masmoudi Sogheir rhythm, which is frequently used in baladi music. It is also sometimes spelled in English as 'beledi' or 'baladee'.

In Egypt, the term baladi does not only apply to local music and dance, and can also apply to many other things that are considered native, rustic or traditional, for example 'baladi bread' or 'Aish Baladi". It is also applied to kinds of food and mostly to fruits and vegetables coming from rural villages.

== Baladi music and dance ==
Baladi means 'of the country' and is a style of Egyptian folk dance from the early 20th century which is still very popular. Thus, Egyptian Beledi means 'of the country of Egypt'. Egyptians have Baladi people, Baladi bread, Baladi rhythms, Baladi music and Baladi dance.

Baladi can take the form of traditional songs, often with a verse-chorus structure – some popular examples include "That il Shibbak" and "Hassan ya Koulli". There is also an improvised musical form in the baladi style.

=== Baladi improvisation ===
This is a structured form of musical improvisation, most usually between a tabla player and an accordionist or saxophonist (although occasionally the ney may be the primary instrument). It is sometimes referred to as a baladi taqsim, ashra baladi, or a baladi progression.

A baladi taqsim consists of a number of distinct sections. Each section has a traditional structure, and the ordering of the sections follows a loose pattern, although this is not always followed. The musicians will not generally include all of the possible sections, but will choose some of them to build a structure for the piece.

Most baladi improvisations will begin with an instrumental solo (taqsim) by the primary instrument. Following this, there is usually a call and response between the instrument and the drummer, flowing into a slow rhythmic section. Further call and response sections and quicker rhythmic sections may follow. The middle part of the piece may include melodies from popular songs, or a section in the Saidi style. The final section is normally the 'tet', which has a quick tempo, and staccato accents on the off-beat.

=== Raqs baladi ===
Raqs baladi is the folk/social form of bellydance. It is more stationary than raqs sharqi, with little use of the arms, and the focus is on hip movements. Baladi dance has a 'heavy' feeling, with the dancer appearing relaxed and strongly connected to the ground. It is performed to baladi or folk music.

Typical costuming for performances of this dance style is a long dress covering the midriff, which may be plain and traditional, or heavily embellished. Traditionally, a baladi dress would resemble a theatrical version of traditional Egyptian clothing. The most common version has a straight skirt with side slits, long sleeves which may be slit to the elbows, and a scooped or shirt-style neckline. Striped fabrics or tulle bi-telli are popular. A sash may be worn around the hips, and a headscarf is often also worn. A baladi-style performance may include the use of sagat, or the dancer may perform with a cane (assaya).

Fifi Abdou, one of the legends of 20th-century Egyptian bellydance, is often described as a baladi-style dancer.

=== 'Baladi' rhythm ===
In the West, the Masmoudi Sogheir ('small Masmoudi') rhythm in Arabic music is often referred to as 'baladi' because it is commonly used in baladi music. This is somewhat misleading, as there are several other rhythms commonly found in the baladi style (including Maqsoum, Saiidi), and this rhythm is also found in other musical styles.

The basic structure of this rhythm, played on the darbuka, is as follows:

- 1 & 2 & 3 & 4 & D-D---T-D---T---

Capitals represent stressed beats. Dum (D) is the dominant hand on the middle of the drum, Tek (T) either the dominant or the non-dominant hand on the rim of the drum. Ka (k) is usually the non-dominant hand on the rim of the drum.

The drummer has freedom to "fill" in between these stressed beats as he/she sees fit to interpret the music. A common fill is:

- 1 & 2 & 3 & 4 & D D tkT D tkT D D tkT D tkT tk

Here, the second version has a "bridge" to lead it into the next bar.

== Baladi foods ==
In Egypt, some fruits and vegetables are sold and announced as "baladi" products, i.e. native, natural, fresh, un-cultivated and un-engineered. This usually refers to specific cultivars of fruit and vegetables that are rarely sold outside of farmer's markets and have unique visual or culinary attributes, for example the fan-like baladi eggplant, or the small and hairy baladi cucumber that is used for pickling. Eish baladi or aish baladi is a rustic Egyptian flatbread similar to pita.

In Palestinian culture, baladi refers to local agricultural produce cultivated via traditional means, which are typically rain-fed, often in contrast to mass produced goods, especially those imported from Israel.

The Syrian news outlet Enab Baladi (lit. 'The grapes of my country') was named after the baladi grapes of Darayya which are considered a symbol of Syrian town.

== Baladi dog ==
The term "Baladi dog" does not refer to a particular dog breed. The term generally refers to a type of stray dog that lives and roams around the streets of cities in Egypt. Furthermore, these dogs are sometimes treated like pests, although rescue groups have made efforts to bring these dogs to volunteer owners, especially in the United States. Baladi dogs are typically skinny, medium-sized dogs with a short, colored coat of beige, brown, or black. It is said that the Baladi dog is a mix of 6 breeds of dogs that lived in Ancient Egypt. Due to this mix, not only are Baladi dogs resilient and smart, they are very adaptable, responsive to training, obedient, loyal, strong, good hunters, and can find their way home incredibly well.

== See also ==
- Egyptian music
- Belly dance
- Music of Egypt
- Rhythm in Arabic music
