= FBME Bank =

Former international commercial bank

FBME BANK
- Company type: Private Company
- Industry: Banking, Financial services
- Founded: 1953
- Headquarters: Dar es Salaam, Tanzania
- Area served: Cyprus; Russia; Tanzania
- Key people: Ayoub-Farid Michel Saab; Chairman; Fadi Michel Saab; Managing Director
- Products: Credit cards, consumer banking, corporate banking, investment banking, mortgage loans, private banking, wealth management
- Total assets: TSh 4.4 trillion (US$2.716 billion) (Q3:2013)
- Subsidiaries: FBME Card Services
- Website: fbme.com

FBME Bank was an international commercial bank. It offered commercial banking services and products to corporate and individual clients. Its traditional banking lines included international payment services, multi-currency account, credit facilities, trade finance, forex trading facilities, internet banking and international card services. FBME serviced clients worldwide.

As of September 2013, FBME was the largest commercial bank in Tanzania, with a total asset base valued at approximately TSh 4.4 trillion (US$2.716 billion), with shareholders' equity of approximately TSh 291 billion (US$179.63 million).

== History ==
The bank was founded in 1952 in Lebanon, as the Federal Bank of Lebanon SAL. In 1982 Federal Bank of the Middle East was established in Cyprus as a subsidiary of the Federal Bank of Lebanon SAL. In 1986 Federal Bank of the Middle East changed its country of incorporation to the Cayman Islands and its banking presence in Cyprus was transformed to that of a branch of the Cayman Islands entity. Since 1993 it had maintained a Representative Office in Moscow.

In 2003, Federal Bank of the Middle East terminated its banking presence in the Cayman Islands and established its parent company and operational headquarters in Tanzania. At the same time, its Cyprus operations became a branch of Federal Bank of the Middle East, Tanzania.

In 2005 the Federal Bank of the Middle East Changed its name to FBME Bank. FBME Card Services Limited (FBMECS) was incorporated in 2002 and in 2004/5 took over the Card Services operations of FBME Bank.

=== Controversy ===
In 2014 the Financial Crimes Enforcement Network accused FBME, which operates primarily in Cyprus, of facilitating financial transactions for multinational organised crime organizations and Hezbollah. The Central Bank of Cyprus took over management of the bank and appointed Mr. Dinos Christofides as administrator, who was later replaced by Andrew Andronicou and thereafter Andronicou was replaced by Chris Iacovides.

In May 2015, the International Chamber of Commerce's Arbitral Tribunal called on Cypriot banking authorities to abstain from taking any measures that would destroy irrevocably the business of FBME Cyprus pending completion of arbitration. The request for Interim Measures had been filed by Ayoub-Farid Michel Saab and Fadi Michel Saab, owners of the bank and claimants in the dispute against the Republic of Cyprus. FBME Bank said this confirmed Procedural Order No. 1 by inviting the Republic of Cyprus to refrain from proceeding to the sale or the resolution of FBME Bank before the end of this arbitration and put Cypriot financial authorities under obligation to notify any further measure regarding FBME Cyprus 30 days in advance, and that Cyprus could no longer act in isolation and put all interested parties before a fait accompli. Further, FBME, the Arbitral Tribunal, and Messrs. Saab, owners would be in a position to react before a decision was final, and have an opportunity to take all measures and legal actions that they deemed appropriate.

On December 21, 2015, the Central Bank of Cyprus revoked the branch license of FBME bank in Cyprus.

After the deposit guarantee scheme was activated for customers with accounts in Cyprus, the bank's staff in Cyprus started a strike. In June 2016, staff agreed to assist with the administration of the deposit guarantee scheme and customers start receiving their money up to €100,000. There are in 2016 numerous court cases ongoing. The verdicts show a sense of predictability.

In April 2017, the bank appealed a ruling from a Washington, D.C. federal court which in effect cut off the bank from the American financial system.

On May 5, 2017, the Bank of Tanzania discontinued all banking operations of FBME Bank Ltd, revoked its banking business license, placed it under liquidation and appointed the Deposit Insurance Board as a liquidator.

On December 24, 2017, The Guardian reported that the United States Federal Bureau of Investigation – in connection with Robert S. Mueller III's investigation (into possible connections between the Russian government and the 2016 U.S. presidential campaign of Donald Trump) – had asked the Central Bank of Cyprus for financial information about FBME, specifically into information that the bank was used by wealthy Russians with political connections accused by the US government of money laundering. Bloomberg further reports that the Russia-related investigation into FBME was connected to a flow of illegal Russian funds into the New York real estate market.

A court order to liquidate the Cyprus branch of FBME Bank Ltd. was presented on June 29, 2023, by Judge Y. Kyriakidou of the Nicosia District Court.

== Ownership ==
The shares of stock of FBME Bank were owned by Lebanese bankers Ayoub-Farid M Saab (50%) and Fady M Saab (50%).

== Branch network ==
The bank maintains the following branches:

Cyprus

1. Nicosia Branch - 90 Archbishop Makarios III Avenue, 1077 Nicosia, Cyprus
2. Limassol Branch - Omiros & Araouzos Tower, 25 Olympion Street, 3035 Limassol, Cyprus

Tanzania

1. Main Branch at Samora Avenue, Dar es Salaam, Tanzania
2. Zanzibar Branch - 19-1 Kisiwandui, Zanzibar, Tanzania
3. Arusha Branch - 47 Old Moshi/Haile Selasie Road, Arusha, Tanzania
4. Mwanza Branch - Station Road, Mwanza, Tanzania

Russia

1. Moscow Representative Office - 7/11, 3rd Lusinovsky Lane, 119049 Moscow, Russia

== See also ==
- List of banks in Cyprus
- List of banks in Tanzania
- Economy of Cyprus
- Economy of Tanzania
