= Maqsoum =

Egyptian urban folk music genre

Maqsoum (Egyptian slang: Maasoum) is a derivative form of the traditional Egyptian Baladi genre, an urban folk rhythmic style. The only difference is the accent on the second beat of maqsoum.

== Difference between baladi and maqsoum ==
The basic structure of the baladi rhythm, played on the darbuka, is as follows:

1 & 2 & 3 & 4 &
D-D---T-D---T---

(Dum Dum ... Tek Dum ... Tek ...)

While the basic structure of the maqsoum rhythm, played on the same instrument, is as follows:

1 & 2 & 3 & 4 &
D-T---T-D---T---

(Dum Tek ... Tek Dum ... Tek ...)

Where capital letters represent the stressed beats. Dum is the dominant hand on the middle of the tabla, Tek either the dominant or the non-dominant hand on the rim of the tabla.

== See also ==
- Bellydance
- Dumbek rhythms
- Music of Egypt
- Egyptian music
