= Libana =

Libana is a Boston-based cross-cultural musical ensemble performing world folk traditions through chants, dance, storytelling, and musical performance.

Their repertoire incorporates ancient, traditional, and contemporary world folk music. Although many of their songs are performed as an a cappella choir, their instruments have included guitars, hammered dulcimers, ouds, bağlamas, pan flutes, charangos, djembes, davuls, frame drums, double bass, clarinets, dumbeks, accordions, and naqarehs.

They focus on the divergent cultural expressions of the Mediterranean, the Balkans, the Middle East, Europe, Africa, Asia and South America. They have toured in America, Canada, Bulgaria, India, Greece, and Morocco.

As of 2024, the collective consists of 6 musicians, which are likely Lisa Bosley, Allison Coleman, Linda Ugelow, Cheryl Weber, Marytha Paffrath and founder Susan Robbins. Libana's goals are to inspire "dynamic cross-cultural understanding, profound healing, and widespread peacebuilding".

== History ==
=== Formation ===
In 1979, artistic director Susan Robbins founded the group. They began as a chorus of 25 women who sought to explore "music and culture specific to women". They were, in part, inspired by American visual artist Judy Chicago's groundbreaking exhibit The Dinner Party, which debuted the same year. Over time, the group "honed down to a core of [6] people that were really willing to make the lasting commitment", which the ensemble members has jocularly referred to as a "long-term relationship".

The band was named for Lubna (a.k.a. Libana) of Córdoba. In 2014, founder Susan Robbins clarified that Libana's name symbolized "that women have always been creative and visionary but we might not always have heard about them through time. Her essence became a symbol for us of our mission". As of 2014, the group consists of Lisa Bosley, Allison Coleman, Linda Ugelow, Cheryl Weber, Marytha Paffrath and founder Susan Robbins. In 2014, they performed at the First Parish Unitarian Universalist Church in Brewster.

Drummer Marytha Paffrath described their mission:

There’s a whole world of music out there that has been going on for centuries, and that we should all know about. We just want to make beautiful music and get people thinking.

=== Performances ===
Before performing each song, Libana performers provide necessary historical information in "succinct, yet colorful, introductions", which audiences say are "an appreciated element of their shows".

Since becoming a smaller group of 6 (rather than 25 at their inception), Libana has been able to travel the world.

In 2011, they embarked on a musical tour of northern India, where they were invited to be weeklong artists-in-residence at the American Embassy School in New Delhi. Afterwards, they traveled to Barefoot College, "a Ghandian educational institute in Rajathstan that teaches women from poor agricultural communities sustainable skills like solar engineering".

In 2013, Libana became the first American act to perform at the World Music Festival in Tangier, Morocco. While there they met female Sufi singers and percussionists in Medina of Fez.

They have performed at The Prairie School of Wisconsin 5 times between 1980 and 2015. In 2015, they performed as part of the school's "Around the World in 165 Days" initiative, incorporating music, dances, and stories from Egypt, Hawaii, Bolivia, and Malaysia.

Circa 2015, they debuted two ancient Ukrainian songs in Racine, Wisconsin.
