= Ayoub Rachane =

Moroccan footballer

Personal information
- Full name: Ayoub Rachane
- Date of birth: July 12, 1988 (age 38)
- Place of birth: Casablanca, Morocco
- Height: 1.83 m (6 ft 0 in)
- Position: Midfielder

Senior career*
Years	Team	Apps	(Gls)
2006	Rachad Bernoussi	84	(23)
2007	FC Luzern	9	(3)
2008–2010	Yverdon-Sport FC	29	(8)
- * Club domestic league appearances and goals as of 09:33, 18 February 2009 (UTC)

Ayoub Rachane (born 12 July 1988) is a Moroccan footballer who last plays for Yverdon-Sport FC.
