= M. M. Ayoub =

Egyptian academic

Mohamed M. Ayoub is an Egyptian retired P.W. Horn Professor of Industrial Engineering at Texas Tech University. He is a pioneer in the field of ergonomics, specifically relating to the application of mechanics to manual material handling.

== Education ==
Ayoub holds a BS degree in Aeronautical Engineering which he earned at the University of Cairo, graduating in 1953. His MS (1955) and PhD (1964) are in Industrial Engineering from the University of Iowa. The thesis title is Effect of Weight and Distance Traveled on Body Member Acceleration and Velocity for Three-dimensional Moves.

== Career ==
Ayoub has served as a consultant to both OSHA and NIOSH. He was both the organizer and the first director of the ergonomics division of the Institute of Industrial Engineers (IIE) and its first director (the IIE now gives an award in his honor). He also served as president of the International Society for Occupational Ergonomics and Safety. Additionally, Ayoub is a fellow of the Human Factors and Ergonomics Society, a fellow of the Ergonomics Society, the American Society of Engineering Education. Ayoub also served on the Human Factors Committee for the National Academy of Sciences, and was a member of the NIOSH Board of Scientific Counselors.
