= Lubna of Córdoba =

10th century Andalusian intellectual and mathematician

- لبنى القرطبية
- Born: 10th century Madīnat al-Zahrā, Córdoba, Al-Andalus
- Occupations: Poet, Mathematician, Intellectual

Lubna of Córdoba (Lubna Al-Qurṭubiyya, Arabic: لبنى القرطبية) was an Andalusian intellectual, mathematician and poet of the second half of the 10th century known for the quality of her writing and her excellence in the sciences. Lubna was born into slavery and raised within the Madīnat al-Zahrā palace. She then pursued a career within the palace as part of Al-Hakam II's team of copyists.

== Early life ==
Little to no information is known about Lubna's upbringing. Most accounts available are historian and scholar speculations based on facts about women in a similar position during the 11th century in Al-Andalus.

Lubna was born within the Madīnat al-Zahrā, under the rule of the caliph Abd al-Rahman III, which began in 929. During his reign the number of enslaved people in Córdoba increased. Lubna was enslaved from birth.

José Miguel Puerta Vílchez of the University of Granada, claims that Lubna's father was caliph Abd al-Rahman III, which would make her one of his sixteen daughters. Although records show the names of his 11 sons, the names of his daughters remain unwritten, except for daughters Hind and Wallada. The children of the caliph were typically raised by their enslaved mothers within the royal harem. One example is Al-Hakam II, Abd al-Rahman III's son and heir to the throne, who was born to Marjan, raised within the palace harem, and went on to work alongside Lubna in the library.

Lubna is thought to have had a good education available throughout her life in order to later become an intellectual and a scholar of the caliph's court. Additionally, there were religious motivations which made the practice of educating, freeing, and employing enslaved people more common under Muslim rule.

== Career ==
Lubna started out as a copyist for the library of Al-Hakam II, who rose to power as caliph in 961.

According to Arab chronicles, in the time of Caliph Al-Hakam II, more than 170 literate women could be found in some suburbs of the city; these women were responsible for making copies of valuable manuscripts. This gives an idea of the culture and the role of women during the reign of the Caliph.

Al-Hakam II followed in his father's footsteps by freeing Lubna and appointing her as his resident secretary and scholar. As part of her responsibilities Lubna was also in charge of the library, of which she had expert knowledge gained from her experience of transcribing the manuscripts it held.

Lubna was one of at least 100 people that were freed from enslavement by Al-Hakam II before and after his death. In the case that she was given documents that proclaimed her freedom, she would have been part of the "freedmen" (mawla, mawali) social class of Muslim society. During 11th century Al-Andalus, it was not unusual for former slaves of the palace to obtain positions of power, and they were often trusted more than local politicians.

In the library of Córdoba, Lubna was in charge of playing, writing, and translating many manuscripts. She studied these texts and wrote valuable commentaries and annotations on them. Some of these texts include those of Archimedes and Euclid. Along with Hasdai ibn Shaprut, she was the driving force behind the creation of the famous library of Medina Azahara, which was home to at least 400,000 books.

Historian Joyce E. Salisbury of the University of Wisconsin, Green Bay describes Lubna's engagement with the community outside of the palace walls. She tutored children in math, and as she went back into the palace, they would follow her reciting multiplication tables.

She was also included in Ibn Bashkuwāl's biographical dictionary of Islamic Spain's scholars, ‘Continuation of the scholarly history of al-Andalus' (Kitāb al-ṣila fī taʾrīkh aʾimmat al-Andalus, Arabic: كتاب الصلة في تاريخ أئمة الأندلس وعلمائهم ومحدثيهم وفقهائهم وأدبائهم ). Here she is described as "an intelligent writer, grammarian, poetess, knowledgeable in arithmetic, comprehensive in her learning; none in the palace was as noble as she...", as having "great knowledge of mathematics and other sciences as well", and as being well-versed in the exact sciences, with the ability to solve "the most complex geometrical and algebraic problems known in her time."

== Questions of identity ==
There are many questions pertaining to Lubna's identity and her role within the Madīnat al-Zahrā's library and palace.

Although variants of her name are found throughout various historical sources, they overlap significantly in terms of time, place, and role in the palace. Lubna has also been found under the names of Labna, Labanna/Labana, Libana, and Labona throughout different historical accounts.

As writer Kamila Shamsie analyzes, "What does seem clear about Lubna of Cordoba is that she was connected to both the palace and the world of books during the reign of al-Hakam II, and was significant enough to be remembered for her intellect and learning." She also affirms that Lubna was most likely enslaved within the royal court, contrasting the theory with that of Lubna being a Fatimid invited to the court for specialized book acquisition.

As Al-Hakam II's personal secretary, the narrative of Lubna being both in charge of the workings of the library and book acquisition in Cairo, Damascus and Baghdad would not be logistically possible, given that she would have to physically leave the library for long periods of travel time.

Kamila Shamsie claims that Lubna might have been two different women, Lubna and Fatima – combined into one woman because the historian responsible could not comprehend that there were two female intellectuals at the same court. Lubna and Fatima are described as two different people in several historical accounts, such as in The Story of Islamic Spain by Syed Azizur Rahmad and La corteza de la letra by Marietta Gargatagli.

== Legacy ==
A street in Cordoba was named after her in 2019, Avenida Escriba Lubna, commemorating her work as a copyist. She is one out of thirty-three women who are identified in Inmaculada Serrano Hernández's project, "Mujeres en las Calles de Córdoba" ('Women in the Streets of Cordoba'). The project has been created in collaboration with Casa Árabe, Centro de Profesorado de Córdoba, Instituto Andaluz de la Mujer, and promoted by the Ayuntamiento of Cordoba.

The artist Jose Luis Munoz created his own depiction of Lubna. His series focuses on six important figures during the era of Al-Andalus. The portrait of Lubna can be found in the permanent exhibition of La Casa de Sefarad in Córdoba.

She appears as part of the Heritage Floor as part of Judy Chicago's The Dinner Party art installation (1979).

The Essay on BBC Radio 3 featured a series dedicated to Islamic Golden Age. In one episode, writer Kamila Shamsie explores the life of Lubna of Cordoba.

The Spanish historian and novelist Jorge Lorente Pérez describes the life of Lubna of Córdoba in his story "The Infinite Multiplication Table".
