= Eyüboğlu High School =

Eyüboğlu Schools
- Ümraniye, Istanbul; Turkey

Information
- Type: Private, coeducational, bilingual
- Established: 1970
- CEO: Cenk Eyüboğlu
- Campus: Urban area
- Colors: Dark Blue and Yellow
- Nickname: Eyuboğlu
- Website: https://www.eyuboglu.k12.tr/

Eyüboğlu Schools is a private school system consisting of elementary, middle, and secondary schools located in Istanbul. It was founded in 1970 by Dr. Rüstem Eyüboğlu.

The school offers the International Baccalaureate (IB) Program, having been accredited in 2000 as the first Turkish school to receive such recognition from the International Baccalaureate Organisation (IBO). Eyüboğlu Schools host an annual Theory of Knowledge (TOK) Conference, where IB-2 students from around the world gather to discuss the relationship between knowledge and culture.

In addition to the IB Program, Eyüboğlu Schools are accredited to offer the Primary Years Programme (PYP) and Middle Years Programme (MYP). Eyüboğlu College is a comprehensive institution comprising both high and elementary schools and has partnerships with the Turkish Ministry of Education, the European Council of International Schools (ECIS), the International Baccalaureate Organisation (IBO), the National Middle School Association (NMSA), the Near East South Asia Council of Overseas Schools (NESA), the American Association of Variable Star Observers (AAVSO), the Astronomical Society of the Pacific (ASP), the Educational Collaborative For International Schools, and the International Schools Theatre Association (ISTA).

The primary language of instruction at Eyüboğlu Schools is English. The Çamlıca campus features twin observatories, making Eyüboğlu the only K-12 school in Turkey to have an observatory.

== History ==
The foundation of Eyüboğlu Schools was laid in 1970 when Dr. Eyüboğlu opened "Arı Dershanesi," an institution offering specialized university preparation courses and coaching for university entrance exams. In 1985, Dr. Eyüboğlu founded Eyüboğlu High School in the Kadıköy (Chalcedon) district of Istanbul. Initially serving 330 students, the high school moved to its purpose-built campus in Çamlıca in 1988. The same year, Kadıköy Primary School was established in the building vacated by the high school. Today, Eyüboğlu Schools have approximately 2,000 students in total.

The Çamlıca site has gradually developed over the years. In 1993, the Science High School was opened, and the campus facilities were expanded to include a Teachers’ Study Hall, Eyüboğlu Library with over 52,000 books and resources in various languages, and Eyüboğlu Hall, which features a 500-seat theater and several science laboratories. In 1994, the guesthouse that had accommodated Eyüboğlu’s national and international guests and in-service training groups was transformed into the Administration Building of Eyüboğlu Educational Institutions.

In 1997, Eyüboğlu Science High School relocated to its new building within the Çamlıca Campus. That same year, the first observatory/space research lab in a Turkish high school was opened. The Eyüboğlu Education and Scientific Research Foundation and the Eyüboğlu Education, Culture and Social Services Foundation were established in 1997 to support Eyüboğlu Schools’ academic endeavors.

In 1998, the Çamlıca Primary School and open-air sports facilities were inaugurated in a ceremony attended by then Turkish President Süleyman Demirel. The following year, 5,000 square meters of the open-air sports facilities were converted into green space for student activities. In 2000, responding to demand from primary school students and parents, a second observatory was opened in a ceremony attended by Metin Bostancı, the Minister of Education at the time.

In the summer of 2002, the construction of the Sports and Arts Complex was completed. The complex, which was state-of-the-art at the time, includes a semi-Olympic swimming pool, two gyms, an outdoor archery practice court, a running track, drama and theater rooms, choir rehearsal rooms, visual arts studios, multipurpose rooms, a cafeteria, and the school radio station.

In 2005, the campus saw further expansion with the addition of the Innovation and Technology Building, which houses computer labs, robotics workshops, and research and development centers. In 2007, Eyüboğlu Schools introduced a Green Campus Initiative, focusing on sustainable practices and environmental education. This initiative led to the establishment of organic gardens, renewable energy sources, and waste management systems within the campus.

In 2010, Eyüboğlu Schools celebrated its 25th anniversary with the opening of the Eyüboğlu Art Gallery, featuring works by students, faculty, and renowned artists. The same year, the campus expanded its facilities to include a new music center with recording studios and practice rooms.

In 2015, the Çamlıca Campus introduced a state-of-the-art STEM Center, dedicated to science, technology, engineering, and mathematics education. This center provides students with hands-on learning experiences and opportunities to participate in national and international competitions.
