= Afif Chaya =

Lebanese singer and actor

- عفيف شيا
- Born: January 10, 1947 (age 79); Chouf District, Mount Lebanon Governorate, Lebanon
- Occupations: Singer, actor

Afif Chaya (Arabic: عفيف شيا) is a Lebanese singer and actor.

== Discography ==
- Aalanet El Hob. 1980
- Al Amira. 1984
- whyn Hal Turkat. 1985
- Al Donya Um

== Filmography ==
=== Film ===
Year	Title	Role	Notes
2009	Charbel: The Movie	Doctor Najib	Credited as Afif Shaiiya

=== Television ===
- The Sad Night Solo. 2015
- The Old Love. 2011
- Al Armala W Al Shaytan. 2011
- Another Face For Love. 2007
- Khataya Saghira. 2005
- A Man From The Past - Nabil Wahbi. 2004
- My Grandma's Stories. 1984
- Izz ad-Din al-Qassam - Salem voice

=== Plays ===
- You are the Case
