= Rhythm in Arabic music =

Aspect of Arabic music

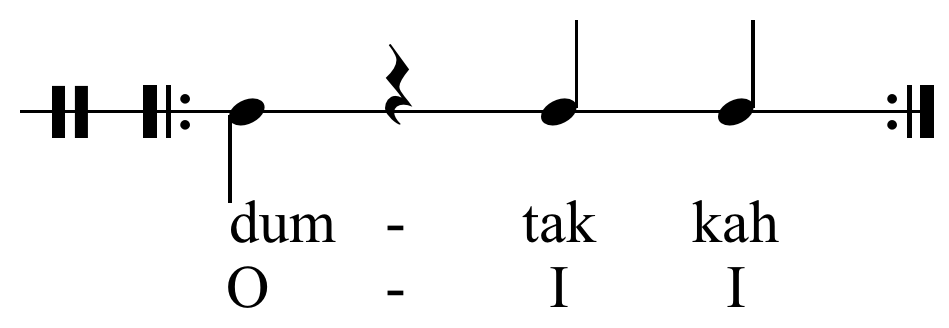
Wazn wahdah sayirah, a relatively short measure of four beats

Rhythms in Arabic music are rich and very diverse, as they cover a huge region and peoples from Northern Africa to Western Asia. Rhymes are mainly analysed by means of rhythmic units called awzan and iqa'at.

== Wazn and Iqa' ==
A rhythmic pattern or cycle in Arabic music is called a "wazn" (Arabic: وزن; plural أوزان / awzān), literally a "measure".

A wazn is only used in musical genres with a fixed rhythmic-temporal organization including recurring measures, motifs, and meter or pulse. It consists of two or more regularly recurring time segments, each time segment consisting of at least two beats (naqarāt, plural of naqrah). There are approximately one hundred different cycles used in the repertoire of Arabic music, many of them shared with other regional music, also found in some South European styles like Spanish music. They are recorded and remembered through onomatopoetic syllables and the written symbols O and I. Wazn may be as large as 176 units of time.

Iqa' (Arabic: إيقاع / īqā‘; plural إيقاعات / īqā‘āt) are rhythmic modes or patterns in Arabic music. There are reputed to be over 100 iqa'at, but many of them have fallen out of fashion and are rarely if ever used in performance. The greatest variety of iqa'at (ranging from two to 48 beats) are used in the muwashshah.

== See also ==
- Dumbek rhythms
- Usul
- Sa'idi
