= Master Ayub =

Pakistani educator

Mohammad Ayub Khan
- محمد ایوب خان
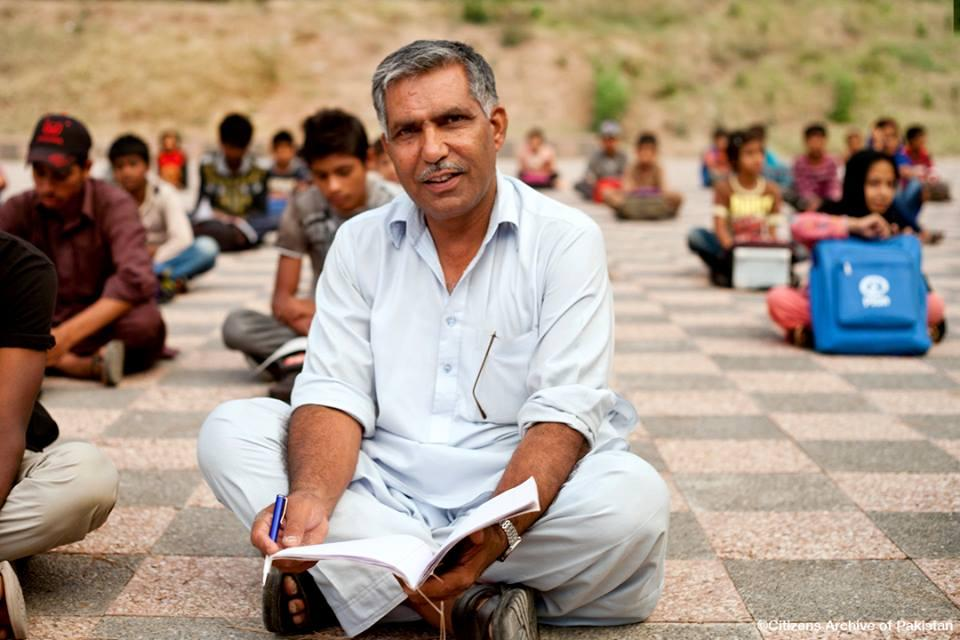
- Ayub in 2016
- Born: Mohammad Ayub Khan; Mandi Bahauddin
- Occupations: Education activist; firefighter
- Years active: 1986–present
- Known for: Free of cost teaching in open air
- Awards: Pride of Performance Commonwealth Points of Light

Mohammad Ayub Khan (Urdu: محمد ایوب خان), better known as Master Ayub, is a Pakistani educator, philanthropist and civil servant who is known for spending his after-job hours and weekends teaching students in an open-air school in F-6 sector, Islamabad.

Master Ayub has received the Pride of Performance award for his efforts spanning over 40 years for education in Pakistan.

== Personal life ==
Ayub, originally belonging to Mandi Bahauddin, is a firefighter with the fire brigade. Been in Islamabad for 38 years, Ayub is now retired and lives with his wife nearby his open-air school he started and still overlooks.

== Free of cost teaching ==
Ayub started teaching a group of four students in F-6, Islamabad. The students have been increasing exponentially and currently, 250+ students are enrolled. The school is managed by Crossadder Foundation and run by voluntary teachers and local donations. All the students studying at the school are underprivileged and are being taught free of cost.

== Smart Street School ==
As of 2022, Crossadder Foundation, a 'for youth, by youth' NGO acquired the NOC from Capital Development Authority and planted a 12'x40' feet portable school at Master Ayub School in a refurbished container. The 'Smart Street School' is used to shelter and periodically facilitate the education of these 250+ students on a daily basis; 85% of these students belong to the local Christian community from the nearby France Colony, Islamabad slums.

== See also ==
- Education in Pakistan
