= Ayyub Guliyev =

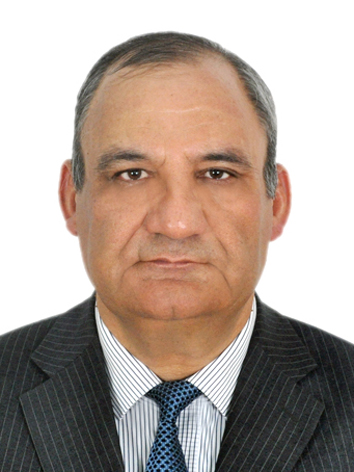
- Born: 1 June 1954 (age 72); Shahbuz District, Nakhichevan ASSR, Azerbaijan SSR, Soviet Union
- Citizenship: Azerbaijan
- Education: Azerbaijan State University
- Scientific career
- Fields: Astrophysics
- Workplaces: Shamakhy Astrophysical Observatory

Ayyub Salah oghlu Guliyev (Azerbaijani: Əyyub Salah oğlu Quliyev; born 1 June 1954) is an Azerbaijani astronomer, researcher in the field of comets and small bodies. He is a doctor of physical and mathematical sciences, professor, corresponding member of Azerbaijan National Academy of Sciences (ANAS) and a former director of the Shamakhy Astrophysical Observatory. He is member of the International Astronomical Union and European Astronomical Society.

== Scientific activities ==
Exploring the comet systems, Guliyev has found more than 50 new regularities. He studied the question of the interaction of comets and planets, has predicted an existence of unknown planetary bodies in the trans-neptunian zone. Guliyev has advanced a new theory on the origin of short-perihelion comet groups.

Jointly with S. K.Vsekhsvyatsky he has predicted tectonic activity of moons of Uranus. Guliyev has predicted the imminent opening of the Neptunian rings before their discovered. He studied the phenomenon of decrease of the absolute brightness of comets, studied and interpreted the distribution of long-period comets nodes and aphelion.

Guliyev is an author of over 170 scientific articles, including three books. The minor planet 18749 Ayyubguliev is named after him.

- Guliyev A.S., Nabiyev Sh.A. (2015). The features of sporadic hyperbolic meteors observed by television techniquesin the period of 2007–2009. Planetary and Space Science, voll.118,1 December. 107–111.
- Guliyev A.S. (2010). Origin of short-perihelion comets. Baku, Publ. Comp. Elm, 151P.
- Всехсвятский С. К., Гулиев А. С., 1981. Система комет Урана – пример эруптивной эволюции спутников планет // Астрон. журн. –59., 3. с. 630–635.
- Гулиев А. С., 1992б. Анализ значений постоянной Тиссерана для периодических комет // Кинематика и физика небесных тел. –8.,2. – с. 40–47.
- Гулиев А.С. Результаты исследования узловых расстояний долгопериодических комет // Кинематика и физика небесн.тел.1999. Т15, No.1. С.85–92
- Guliyev A.S. On hyperbolic comets. Proceedings of the International Astronomical Union, Volume 5, Symposium S263, August 2009, pp. 81–84
- К.И.Чурюмов, Гулиев А. С., В.Г.Кручиненко, Т.К.Чурюмова. Кометно-астероидная опастность, реальность и вымыслы Киев-Баку, Элм.2012, 179с.
- Гулиев А. С.Транснептуновый объект 2003 UB 313 как источник комет. Астрон. вестник. 2007. Т41, No. 1. с. 51–60.
- Гулиев А. С., Дадашов А. С. О трансплутоновых кометных семействах // Астрон. вестник. 1989. Т23, No. 1. С. 88–95.
- Quluyev Ə.S. Azərbaycan astronomiyası 20-ci əsrdə. Bakı, Elm, 2001,
- Guliyev A.S., Sh. Nabiyev. The features of sporadic hyperbolic meteors observed by television techniques in the period of 2007–2009. Planetary and Space Science,12,1, 107-111, 2015.
- Guliyev A.S. Collision with meteoroids as one of the possible mechanisms for the splitting of cometary nuclei. Kinematics and Physics of Celestial Bodies, 33,4,191-198.2017.
- Guliyev A.S., R.A. Guliyev.System of Long-Period Comets as Indicator of the Large Planetary Body on the Periphery of the Solar System, Acta Astronomika, 2019, vol.69, №2, p. 177-203.
- Guliyev A.S., R.A. Guliyev. On the role of collisions with meteoroids in splitting and acceleration of heliocentric velocity of comets. Open Astronomy. 2020
- Guliyev A.S., R.A. Guliyev.The influence of solar activity on the discovery of comets of various classes. Kinematics and Physics of Celestial Bodies 2020, 36(1) pp. 35–43
- Guliyev A.S., R.A. Guliyev.О существовании семейств долгопериодических комет планет-гигантов. Письма в АЖ, 2020
- Guliyev A.S., Sh. Nabiyev, R.Guliyev. Test of the hypothesis for an unknown distant massive

planet in the Solar System applying the Tisserand's criterion to a system of long-period comets. Earth, Moon, Planets, 2021,

- Sh. Nabiyev, Jason Yalim, Guliyev A.S., R. Guliyev.Hyperbolic Comets as an indicator of the Hypothetical Planet 9 in the Solar System/Advances in Space ResearchAvailable online 10 February 2022 https://doi.org/10.1016/j.asr.2022.02.001
- Гулиев А. С., Поладова У.D, Р. А. Гулиев Об ударном механизме вспышек блеска комет/Астрономический Вестник, 2022, N4.
- Guliyev A.S., Guliyev R.A. Origin of Short-perihelion Comet Groups. Kinematics and Physics of Celestial Bodies, 2024, N3/

== Bibliography ==
- A new theory of the periodic comets
- Creating the concept of an unknown planet
- Creating a brand new digital catalog of the orbits and comets
