= Joseph Spaniola =

American musician (born 1963)

Joseph T. Spaniola (born May 7, 1963) is an American musician and chief composer/arranger for the United States Air Force Academy Band. Since 2007, he has served as professor and director of music theory and jazz studies at the University of West Florida. Spaniola graduated with a B.A. and M.A. from Michigan State University and has a PhD. in composition from the University of North Texas. In 2016, he was named Commissioned Composer for the Florida State Music Teachers Association.
