= Souheil Ayoub =

Lebanese fencer (1934–2025)

Personal information
- Born: 19 February 1934 Beirut, Lebanon
- Died: 8 January 2025 (aged 90)

Sport
- Sport: Fencing

Souheil Ayoub (19 February 1934 – 8 January 2025) was a Lebanese fencer. He competed in the individual foil event at the 1968 Summer Olympics. Ayoub died on 8 January 2025, at the age of 90.
