= Job (given name) =

Job is a major figure in the Bible. People with the same given name include:

- Patriarch Job of Alexandria, Greek Patriarch of Alexandria from 954 to 960
- Job of Esztergom, Hungarian prelate and archbishop (1185–1204)
- Patriarch Job of Moscow (died 1607), first Patriarch of Moscow and All Russia and a saint of the Orthodox Church
- Job of Pochayiv (c. 1551 – 1651), Ukrainian Orthodox monk and Eastern Orthodox saint
- Job (Osacky) (1946–2009), archbishop of the Orthodox Church
- Job Adriaenszoon Berckheyde (1630–1698), Dutch painter
- Sir Job Charlton, 1st Baronet (c. 1614–1697), barrister, member and briefly Speaker of the House of Commons of England, and judge
- Job Charnock (c. 1630–1692), English East India Company administrator traditionally regarded as the founder of the city of Calcutta
- Job Cohen (born 1947), leader of the Dutch Labour Party
- Job Durfee (1790–1847), jurist and member of the Rhode Island House of Representatives
- Job Haines (1744–1812), American politician from Maryland
- Job Harriman (1861–1925), vice presidential candidate for the Socialist Party of America and founder of a utopian community
- Job Dean Jessop (1926–2001), American jockey
- Job Koech Kinyor (born 1990), Kenyan middle-distance runner
- Job Mann (1795–1873), member of the U.S. House of Representatives from Pennsylvania
- Job de Roincé (1896–1981), French journalist and writer
- Job ben Solomon or Ayuba Suleiman Diallo (1701–1773), Muslim transported to America as a slave
- Job Tausinga (born 1951), Minister for Education and Human Resources Development of the Solomon Islands
- Job Throckmorton (1545–1601), English religious pamphleteer and Member of Parliament
- Job Roberts Tyson (1803-1858), U.S. Congressman

== See also ==
- Eyüp (name), Turkish variant
- Ayub (name), Arabic variant
