= Ayoub-Farid Michel Saab =

Lebanese banker

Ayoub-Farid Michel Saab (Farid Saab)
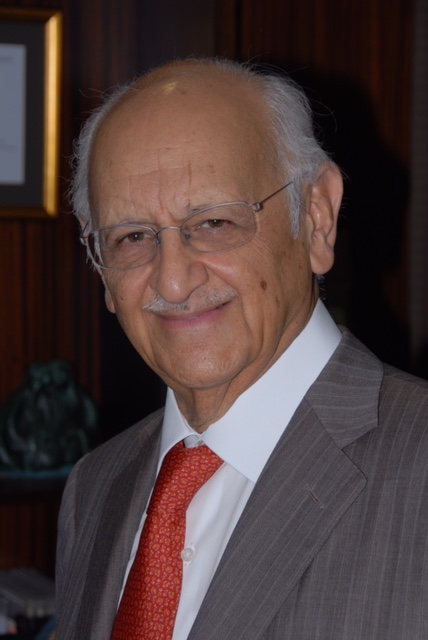
- Ayoub-Farid Michel Saab
- Born: Ayoub-Farid Michel Saab; 14 July 1939 (age 87)
- Education: American University of Beirut
- Occupations: banker, businessman
- Known for: Chairman of Federal Bank of Lebanon; Co-founder of FBME Bank
- Parent: Michel Ayoub Saab

Ayoub-Farid Michel Saab (or just Farid Saab; born 14 July 1939) is a Lebanese banker.

== Early life ==
Saab was born 14 July 1939 in Tehran, Iran and moved to Lebanon at the age of 12. He studied economics at the American University of Beirut and speaks English, French, Arabic, Russian, Persian and Armenian.

== Career ==
Farid Saab was appointed vice president at Federal Bank of Lebanon (FBL) founded in 1952, by his father, Michel Ayoub Saab and his uncle Joseph Ayoub Saab. FBL was amongst the 20 first banks to be established in Lebanon. He served FBL as vice president from 1982 to 1991 and chairman from 1991 to date.

Farid Saab together with his father Michel Ayoub Saab and his brother Fadi Michel Saab founded FBME Bank Ltd (formerly known as Federal Bank of the Middle East). The bank was the oldest offshore bank operating in Cyprus. Farid Saab was appointed FBME's Executive Director at inception from 1982 until 1991. FBME's first Board of Directors comprised Michel Ayoub Saab, Ayoub-Farid Michel Saab and Fadi Michel Saab. Farid Saab continues to serve FBME Bank as Non-Executive Chairman to date.

Arab Financial Services (AFS), one of the largest financial services companies in the Arab world, was established in Bahrain in 1982 under the auspices of the Union of Arab Banks. Farid Saab was appointed as a member of AFS's Board of Directors and served as one of its three founding executive directors. He remained on the AFS Board of Directors until the year 2000.

Farid Saab served as a Member of the Board of Directors of Visa International, EMEA (Europe, Middle East and Africa) from 1986 to 1996.

Upon inception of Visa International's new Region, CEMEA (Central, Eastern Europe, Middle East & Africa), Farid Saab was elected Deputy-Chairman of the Board of Directors of this new region.

Farid Saab was appointed member of the Board of Directors of Visa International, in San Mateo, in California, and served on this Board from 1989 to 1996. He served on the regional boards from 1986 to 1996.
