= Abu Sa'id al-Afif =

Samaritan physician

Abu Saeed al-Afif
- Born: Cairo
- Citizenship: Egypt
- Occupation: Physician
- Known for: Samaritan

Abu Sa'id al-Afif was a Samaritan physician in 15th-century Cairo.
