= Squatting in Pakistan =

Occupation of unused land or buildings without permission

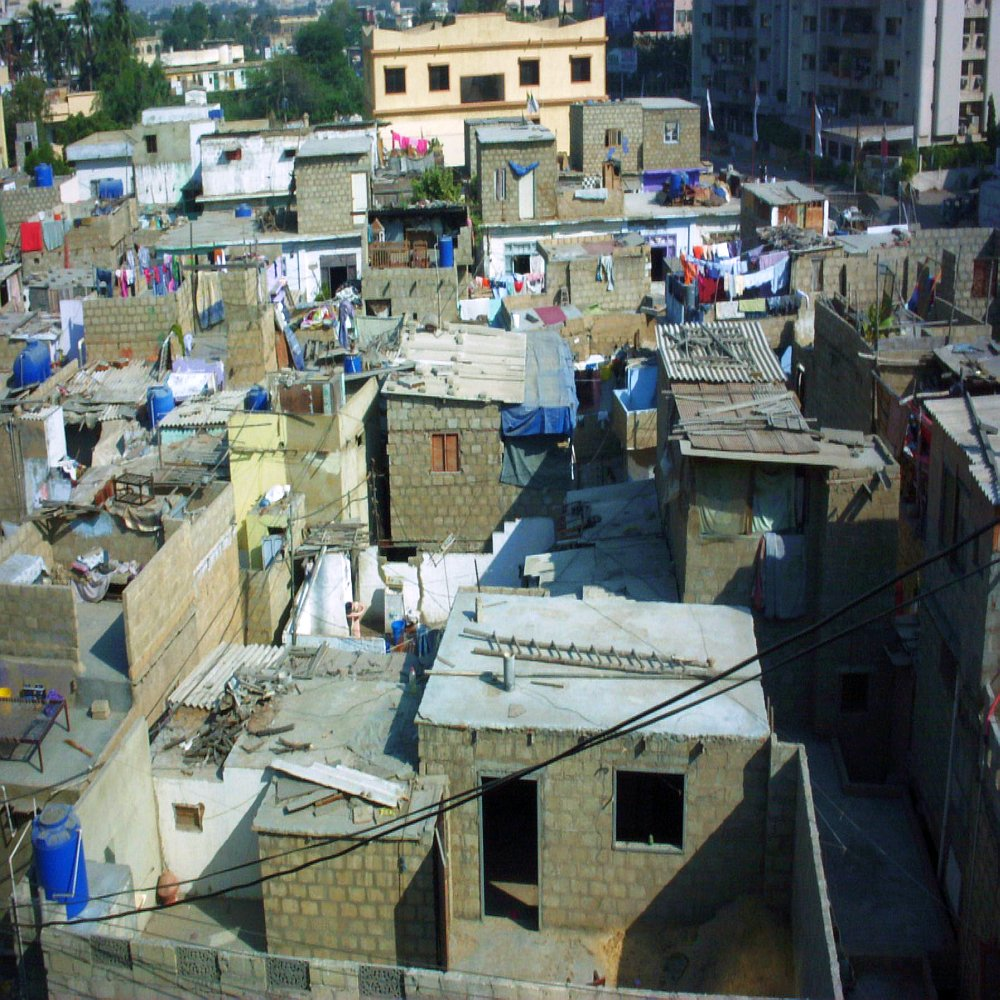
An informal settlement in Karachi

Squatting in Pakistan is the occupation of unused land or derelict buildings without the permission of the owner. Squatted informal settlements formed following the creation of Pakistan in 1947. They were known first as "bastis" then later "katchi abadis" and the inhabitants were forcibly resettled under military rule. By 2007, there were 7.5 million squatters in Karachi alone. The Sindh Katchi Abadi Authority (SKAA) announced in 2019 that a total of 1,414 katchi abadis had been located and 1,006 of those had been contacted with regard to beginning a regularization process.

== History ==
Squatter areas in Pakistan are known as "bastis" or "katchi abadis" and low-income villages absorbed into cities are called "goths". The goths are defined by the Government of Pakistan as slums. After the creation of Pakistan in 1947, the new capital Karachi grew rapidly in size. Bastis were formed either through land invasions or illegal subdividing of existing land. The largest squatter area, Orangi, was home to around a million inhabitants.

Following the 1958 Pakistani coup d'état, the Pakistan Army ruled the country and changed the capital to Islamabad. It decided to move all the squatters in Karachi into two townships called Landhi-Korangi and New Karachi. The katchi abadis were demolished and the inhabitants forcibly resettled.

By the early 1990s, there were over 2 million people squatting in Karachi (out of the 8 million total population) and by 2007, there were 7.5 million squatters out of a total population which had risen to 15 million. There were also katchi abadis in other cities, for example Islamabad had 52 squatter areas in 2015, estimated to be housing over 100,000 people.

== Regularization ==
The government has embarked upon a program of regularization. The Sindh Katchi Abadi Authority (SKAA) announced in 2019 that a total of 1,414 katchi abadis had been located and 1,006 of those had been contacted with regard to beginning a regularization process. Karachi had 575 settlements, Hyderabad 408, Shaheed Benazirabad 144, Larkana 112, Sukkur 91 and Mirpurkhas 84.
