= Ayyub Guliyev (conductor) =

- Born: July 26, 1984 (age 42); Baku, Azerbaijan SSR, USSR
- Genre: symphonic music
- Occupation: conductor
- Years active: 2000–present
- Citizenship: Soviet Union; Azerbaijan
- Education: Hajibeyov Azerbaijan State Conservatoire; Leningrad State Conservatory; University of Music and Performing Arts Vienna

Ayyub Ramiz oghlu Guliyev (Azerbaijani: Əyyub Ramiz oğlu Quliyev,)

He was born on 26 July 1984, an Azerbaijani conductor. Chief conductor and musical director of the State Opera and Ballet Theater of Azerbaijan, chief guest conductor of the Kunming Philharmonic Orchestra (China), Honored Artist of Azerbaijan (2017), laureate of the President's Prize, and laureate of international competitions.

== Biography ==
In 2006, he took first place and received the Orchestra Prize at the IV (International Competition of Conductors) Lutoslawski in Poland, diploma at the Matacic competition in Zagreb (2007), special prize of the Orchestra Preference Award at the Mitropoulos competition in Athens (2008), First prize at the Conducting Competition in Craiova (Romania), Grand Prix and "Prize of Giuseppe Sinopoli" at the IX International Competition named after A. Toscanini in Parma (Italy) and II prize at the "Debut in Laeszhalle" competition in Hamburg. In 2011, as the winner of the competition, he directed the Toscanini Philharmonic Orchestra during the band's tours in Italy and Spain. In 2009 he was awarded the Audience Preference Award at the Musical Olympus International Festival in St. Petersburg. For his merits in the development of the country's musical culture, the President of Azerbaijan awarded him the title of "Honored Artist of Azerbaijan" in 2017 the President's Prize (lasting since 2013). Guliyev is also active in teaching; he is an assistant professor at the Baku Music Academy named after Uzeyir Hajibeyov.

== Education ==
- At the age of 15, he entered the Baku Music Academy named after Uzeyir Hajibeyov and graduated with honors in 2005.
- In 2005–2008 he studied at the graduate school of the Saint Petersburg Conservatory (Department of Opera and Symphony Conducting under Prof. A. I. Polischuk).
- In 2008-2010, interned at the Vienna University of Music and Fine Arts (class of Prof. Mark Stringer) and the European Academy of Music in the Czech Republic (class of Prof. Johannes Schläfli).
- In 2006–2010 he took part in master classes of Professor Mikhail Yurovsky, Yuri Simonov, Daniel Harding and Riccardo Capasso.

== Concert activities ==
In May 2006, he made his debut as an opera conductor at the St. Petersburg Academic Opera and Ballet Theater (The Marriage of Figaro by V. Mozart). In the same year, he became a laureate of the "Achievement of the Year" award of the International Cultural Center, and in 2009 he was awarded the State "Top" award of the Ministry of Culture of Azerbaijan.

In 2011 he was invited to the Azerbaijan State Academic Opera and Ballet Theater as a conductor of the highest qualification. In 2013–2017, he was principal guest conductor of the V. Safonov North Caucasus Philharmonic. In November 2018, he was appointed musical director and chief conductor of the State Academic Opera and Ballet Theater of Azerbaijan.

Collaborated with the Royal Philharmonic Orchestra of Great Britain, Radio France Philharmonic, "Hamburg Klassik", National Orchestra of France "Lamoreux", Orchestra "Helios", Wiener KammerOrchester, Wiener Consilium, Toscanini Philharmonic Orchestra, Orchestra of the Juliard Conservatory of New York, Philharmonic Orchestra "Colors" (Greece), Sopot and Kielce (Poland), Bilkenstky Orchestra (Turkey), Presidential Symphony Orchestra of Turkey, Orchestra of Bursa (Turkey), National Orchestra of Lithuania, State Orchestra of the Republic of Belarus, Philharmonic Orchestra of Moldova, State Orchestra of Kyrgyzstan, Philharmonic Orchestra of Kazakhstan, Orchestra "Craiova" Romania, the Bohdan Varhal Chamber Orchestra of the Slovak Philharmonic, the Johannesburg Philharmonic Orchestra, the Kiev and Donetsk Opera Theater Orchestra. Has taken part in opera and ballet performances at the Mikhailovsky Theater in St. Petersburg, the National Opera Theater of Serbia, the Opera Theater named after E. Teodorini (Romania), Wrocław Opera in Poland.

He directed the premiere of the ballet Love and Death by P. Bul-Bulloglu at the Bolshoi Theater of the Republic of Belarus (2017) and the classical version of the ballet Giselle at the Wroclaw Theater in Poland (2018). In February 2010, he made his US debut at the Six Rising Stars concert at Carnegie Hall, in 2014 at the Konzerthaus, Vienna (Austria), at the Théâtre des Champs-Élysées in Paris (2015) and Laeiszhalle in Hamburg (2018).

On January 18, 22, 23, 2022, the performances of the Arabian Nights ballet took place at the Mariinsky Theater in St. Petersburg, conducted by Guliyev. These performances were dedicated to the 100th birth anniversary of the ballet author, Azerbaijani composer Fikret Amirov.
