= Vurgun Ayyub =

Azerbaijani scientist (1957–2019)

Vurgun Ayyub (October 25, 1957 – 24 September 2019) was an Azerbaijani scientist.

== Biography ==
Ayyub, son of Vurgun Alish, was born in 1957 in Ashagi Gushchu village of Tovuz District.

In 1973 he entered the Faculty of Philology of the former Azerbaijan Pedagogical Institute.

In 1977–1984 he worked as a teacher at the Azerbaijan Pedagogical University named after N. Tusi in Sabirabad and Tovuz regions, and in 1985-1993. Since 1988 he was a Doctor of Philosophy in Philology. He was the author of a book, more than 150 scientific, political and publicist articles.

He was one of the founders and chairman of the Chenlibel scientific and literary association, the first non-governmental organization established in Azerbaijan in 1986, one of the organizers of the Azerbaijan National Liberation Movement, the Popular Front Party, and a member of the PFC Assembly and Management Board.

In 1992-1993, he headed the State Student Admission Commission (SSAC).

On November 15, 1992, a test procedure ensured admission of students without bribes.

He was a member of the Musavat Party Rehabilitation Center since 1992, and since 1997 the Secretary General of the Party. In May 2001, at the 6th congress, the secretariat was replaced by a deputy in accordance with a change in the party's statutes and the first deputy head of Musavat was appointed.

He was a member of the editorial board of the Parallel Daily Electronic Newspaper, which began its work in March 2007.

He died on 24 September 2019 after a long illness.
