= Afif Ayyub =

Lebanese diplomat

Afif Ayyub (alternative spellings: Afif Ayoub, Afif Ayyoub) (born August 30, 1953), a career diplomat, is currently the Director of International Organizations, Conferences and Cultural Relations at the Ministry of Foreign Affairs in Lebanon. He has been in this position since February 2013.

He previously served in several diplomatic missions including Muscat, Sultanate of Oman; Doha, Qatar; Dubai, United Arab Emirates; Paris, France; New York City, The United Nations; and Canberra, Australia.

Ayyub is a graduate of the American University of Beirut (AUB). He got his BSc in Chemistry in 1975, TD in Education in 1975, and MA in Political Studies in 1979.

He is author of Resolutions and Decisions of the United Nations Security Council on Lebanon published in 1991 in English, French, and Arabic.
