= Eyüp (name) =

Eyüp is a Turkish given name for males and a variant of the name Job. People named Eyüp include:

- Eyüp Sabri Akgöl (1876-1950), Ottoman revolutionary and Turkish politician
- Eyüp Aşık (born 1953), Turkish former politician
- Eyüp Can (boxer) (born 1964), Turkish retired boxer
- Abu Ayyub al-Ansari (died 674), a companion (sahaba) of Muhammad, known in Turkish as Eyüp Sultan

== See also ==
- Eyüboğlu (disambiguation)
