= Turkish musical instruments =

Turkish musical instrument

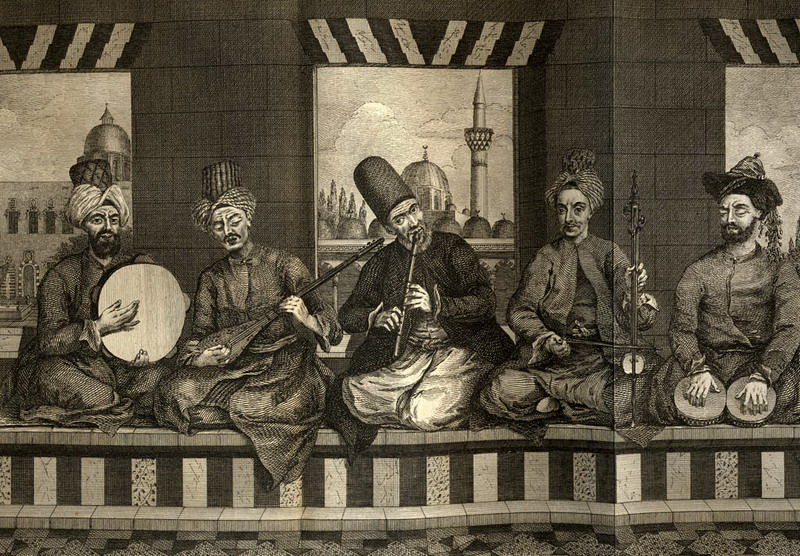
Ottoman musicians playing the daf, Turkish tambur, ney, kabak kemane, and the nagara in Ottoman Aleppo, mid 18th century.

Turkish musical instruments are the traditional and modern instruments used in the musical traditions of the Turkish people. They play a central role in Turkish folk music, Ottoman classical music, and modern Turkish compositions. These instruments can be categorized into three main groups: stringed, wind, and percussion instruments.

== Stringed instruments ==
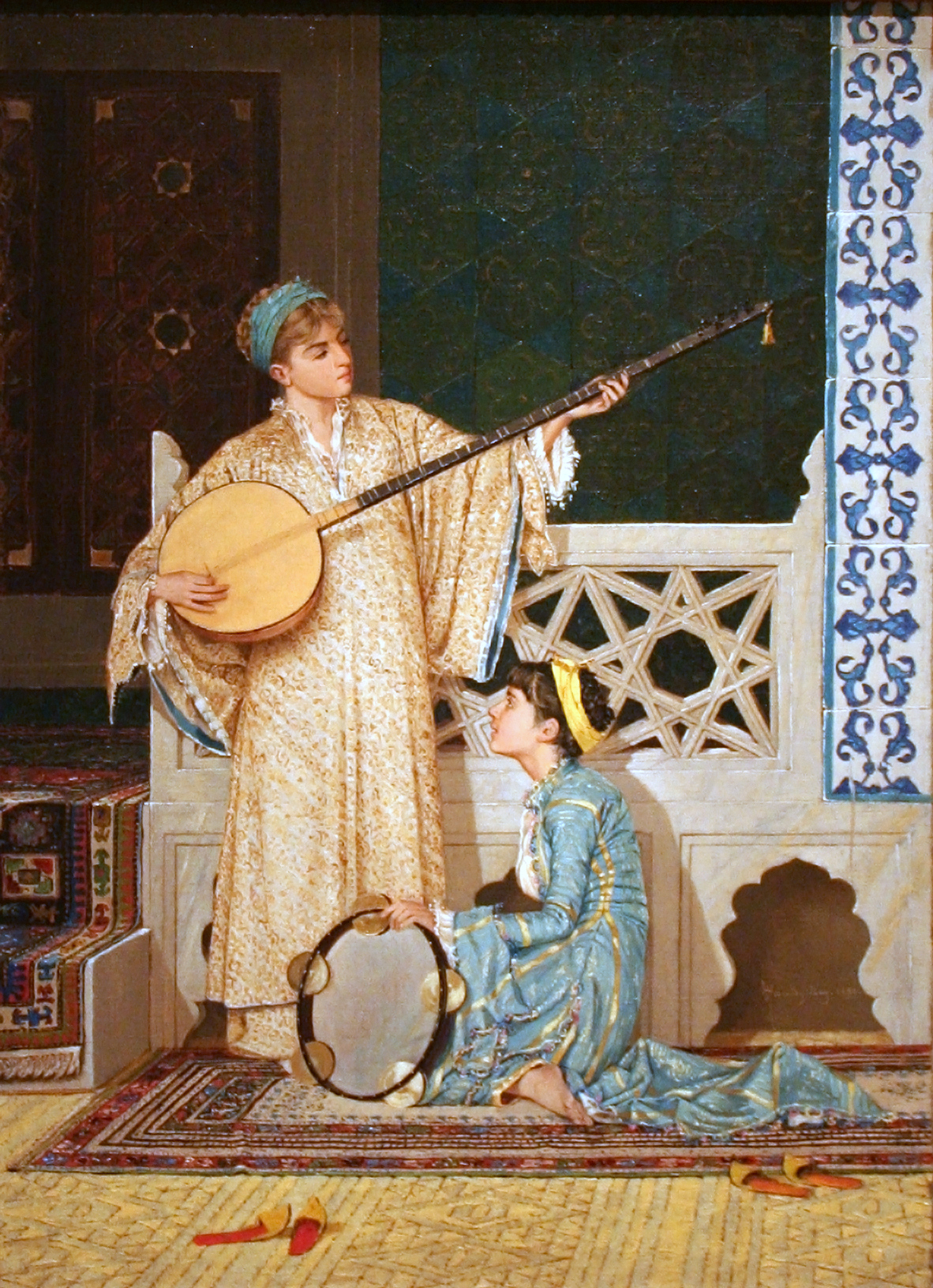
Two young women playing the Turkish tambur in Ottoman-era Turkey.

- Bağlama (Saz)
- Tanbur
- Kemençe
- Kanun
- Ud
- Ahenk
- Çeng
- Classical kemençe
- Karadeniz kemençe
- Cümbüş
- Yaylı tambur
- Rebab / Kabak kemane
- Sine kemanı
- Cura
- Komuz
- Rud
- Lavta
- Mugni
- Santur
- Şehrud
- Tar

== Wind instruments ==
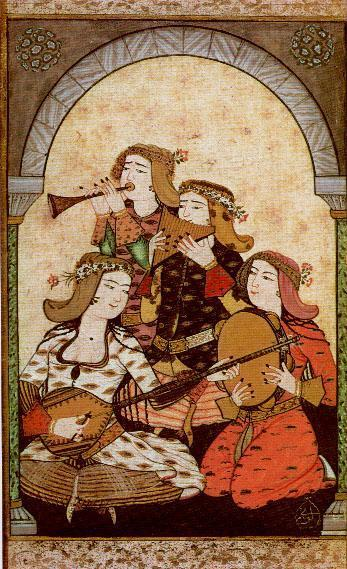
A group of female musicians playing traditional instruments, including zurna, miskal, bağlama, and daf in an Ottoman miniature painting from the book Surname-i Vehbi, written by Seyyid Vehbi (1793).

- Zurna
- Tulum
- Mey
- Düdük
- Kaval
- Çığırtma
- Karkm
- Dankiyo
- Gayda
- Çifte
- Ney
- Turkish ney
- Sipsi
- Dilli kaval
- Dilli ney
- Miskal

== Percussion instruments ==
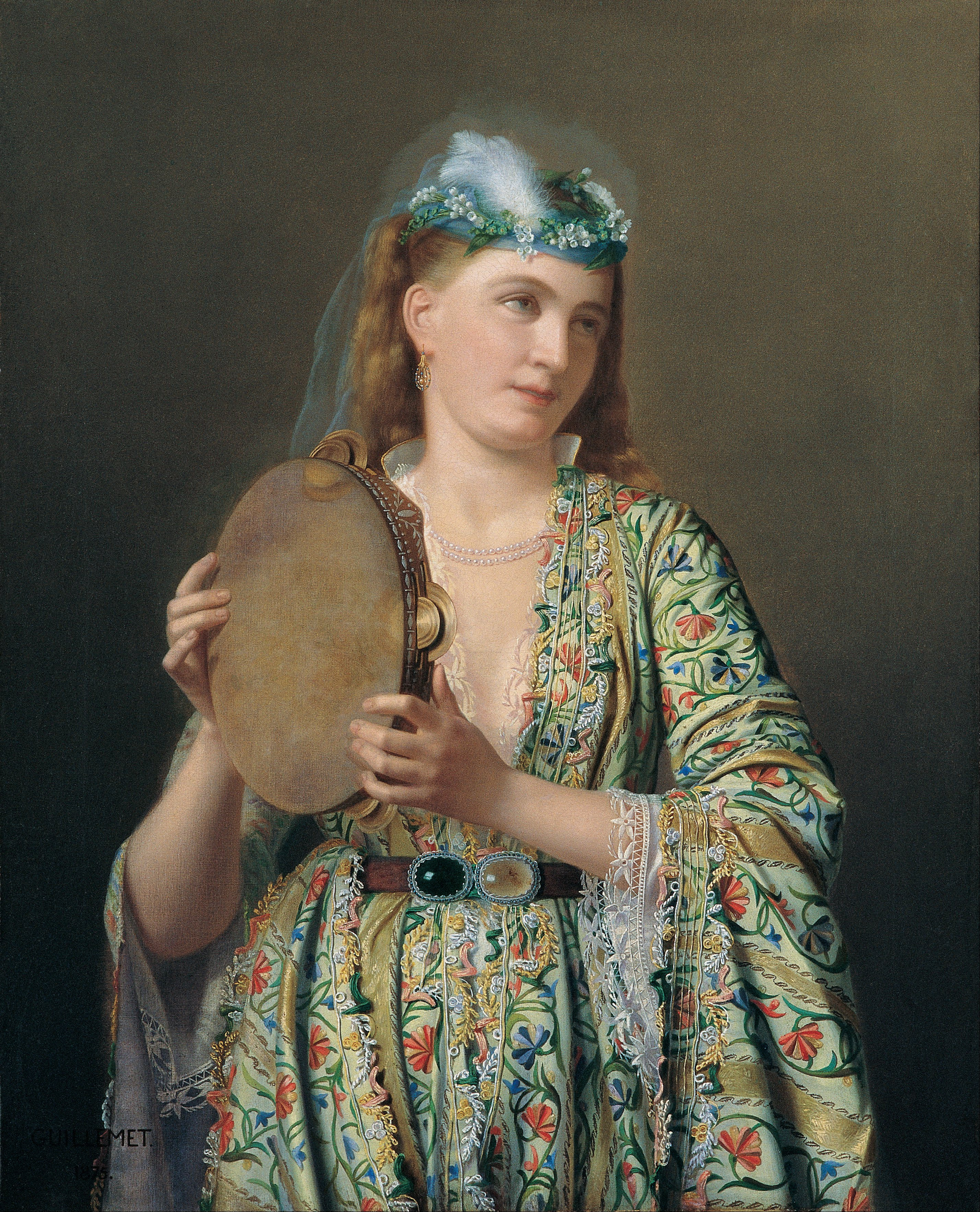
Portrait of a lady of the court playing the daf.

- Davul
- Darbuka
- Kudüm
- Bendir
- Zil
- Cura nagara
- Daf
- Nakkare
- Kös
- Nağara
- Turkish crescent
- Kastanyet
- Kaşık
- Koltuk davulu
