= Boyuk nagara =

Unpitched percussion instrument

- Other names: Kos nagara, wedding nagara
- Classification: Percussion instrument

Playing range
- Rope tensioned

The Böyük nağara, also called the "Kos nağara" or "Toy nağara", is a large double-headed drum. It is played with mallets. The böyük nağara is played in some regions of Azerbaijan especially the Gazakh-Tovuz region, and commonly associated with the Karapapakh population residing in those areas. Its body is cylindrical and made from firm wood. Skins are stretched over both the top and the bottom of the cylindrical body of the instrument. Its diameter is 400–450 mm, and its height is 500–550 mm.

== See also ==
- Nagara (drum)
- Naqareh
- Kudum
- Dhol
- Davul
- Qoltuq nagara
- Kus
