= Azerbaijani wedding traditions =

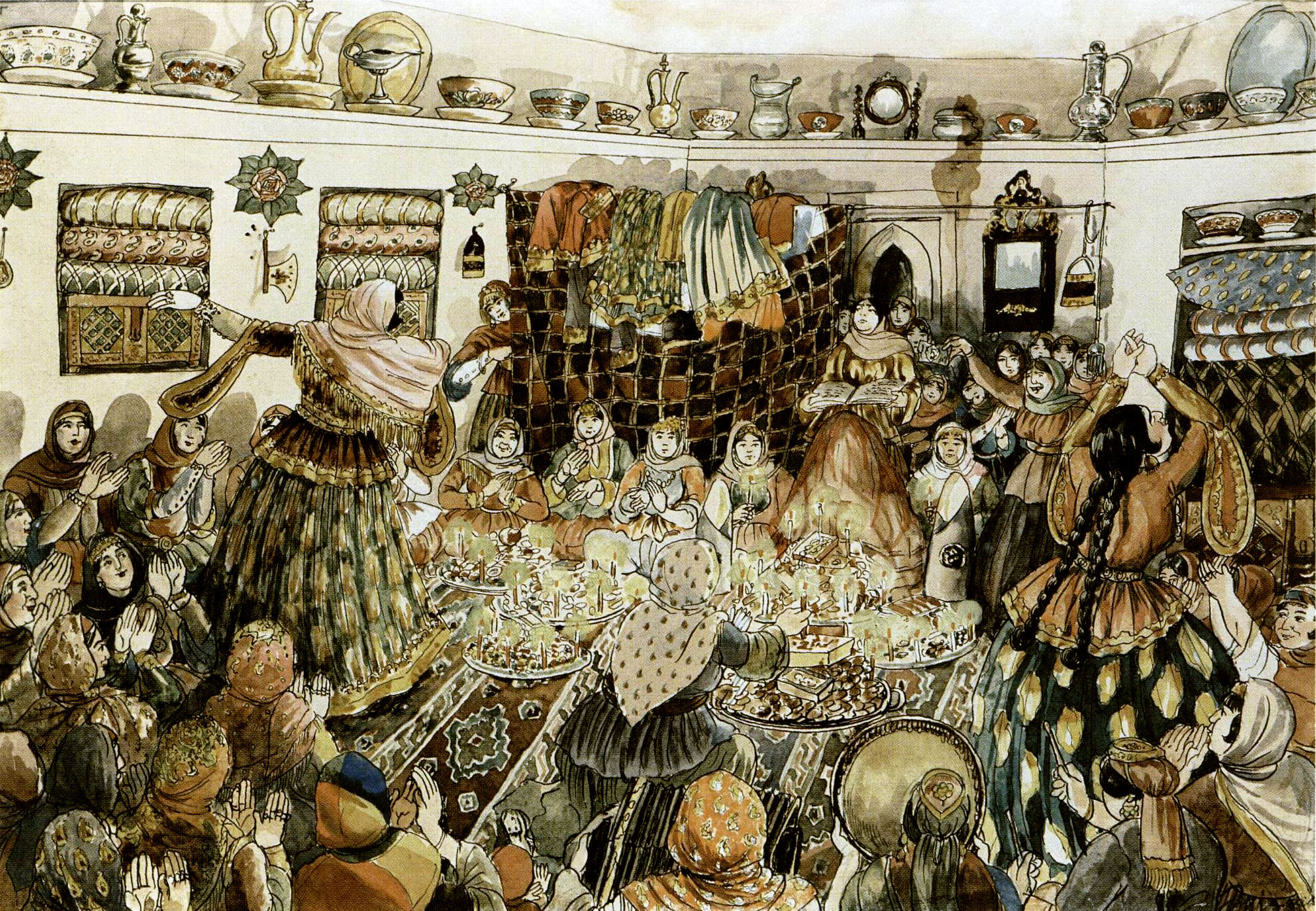
Azim Azimzade. "Women wedding". 1930

The Azerbaijani wedding tradition (Azerbaijani: Azərbaycanın toy adətləri) is one of the most significant and solemn family traditions of Azerbaijani people. It is multi-stepped, and is related to various compulsory rituals and traditions. Ancient Azerbaijani weddings reflect cycles of traditions, lasting for a long period of time, and need significant material costs.

== Structure of the ceremony ==
A formal wedding procedure begins with acceptance of consent of the bride's parents (“söz kəsmək”) and continues after an independent decision about the marriage is made.

=== Qiz Görmə (presentation of a marriageable girl) ===
Such traditions as qız görmə (presentation of a marriageable girl) and qız bəyənmə (approval of the choice) are the first conditions of the wedding. Nearest relatives of the groom, who are gathered together to marry him, begin gathering information about the bride, her parents, and the family where she lives.

=== Elçilik (Matchmaking) ===
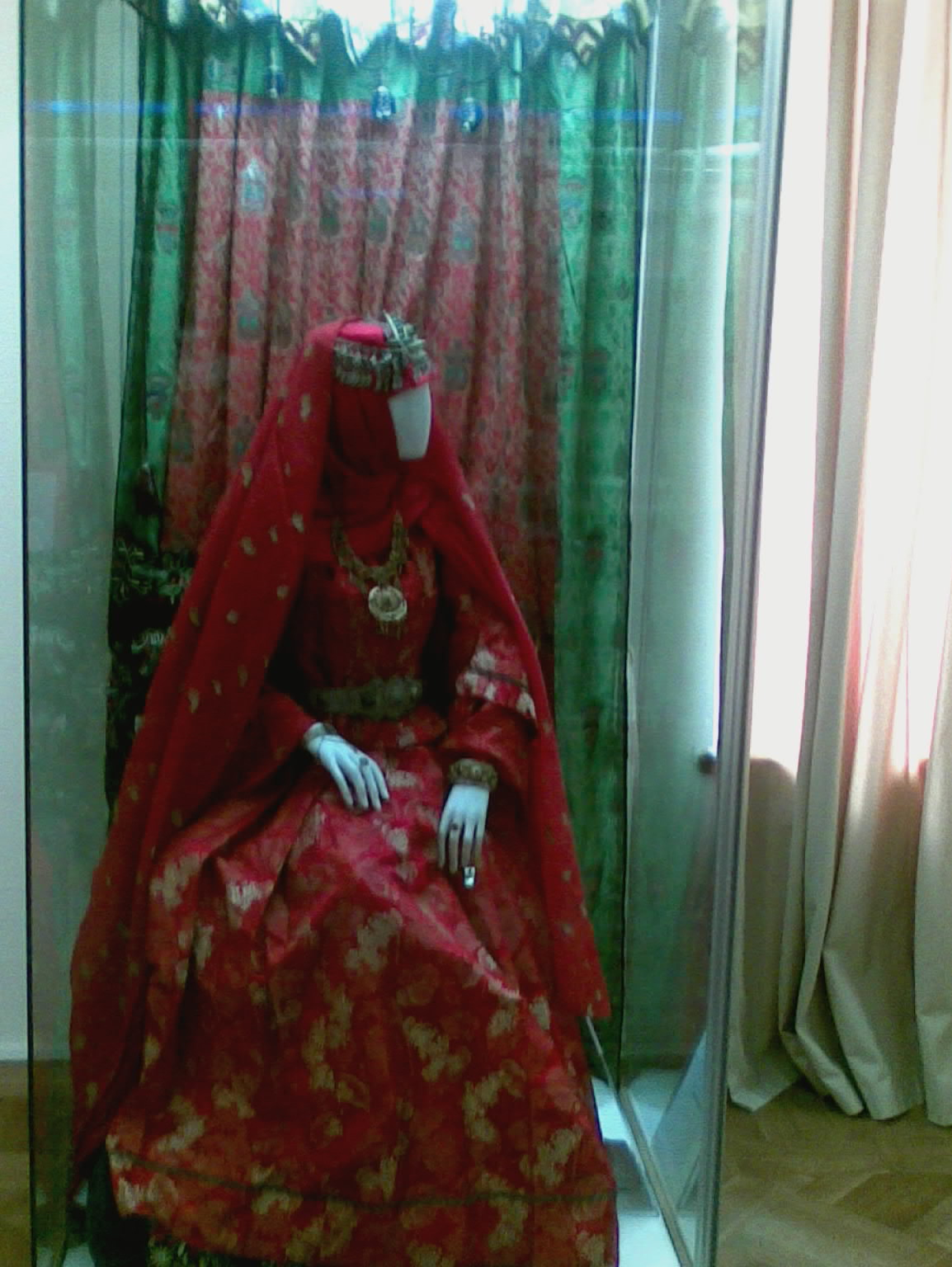
Azerbaijan national wedding costume in Azerbaijan State Museum of History.

The day for sending matchmakers to the bride's house is fixed when the groom's choice is approved.

More respected, elder relatives of the groom take part in the “main” matchmaking ceremony. Being refused is considered a blow to the prestige of the matchmakers. Generally, elder relatives of the groom or his elder sister are sent to the bride's house to obtain acceptance of preliminary consent. Earlier, the tradition required repeated “refusals” for a variety of reasons, but later this was considerably simplified. This simplification could be attributed to the belief that a future companion in life should be equal in rights and that youngsters have a right to make this private choice.

In fixing the day of matchmaking, everybody tries to choose the successful day, which should be a day when all dreams come true. According to an ancient belief, evil spirits bordered the matchmakers’ path on the way to the bride's house, attempted to restrict the commitment, and wanted the matchmaker to receive a refusal and have to return without consent. To counteract this, people attached a pin to doors and walls of the house, which they approach. Evil spirits, frightened of the pin made of iron, did not have enough courage to leave the home and accompany the matchmaker going to the bride's house.

Matchmaking is an indispensable tradition, even when the couple agrees to the match.

=== Başlığ (Payment) ===
Azerbaijan honored the tradition of payment of “Başlığ”. Başlığ is payment for the bride made by the groom's side to the bride's parents, specifically, to her father or another person who offers the bride for marriage. Payment was made in cash, cattle, or other material wealth before the wedding. It was banned during the Soviet era.

=== Nişan (Engagement) or Adax (Betrothal) ===
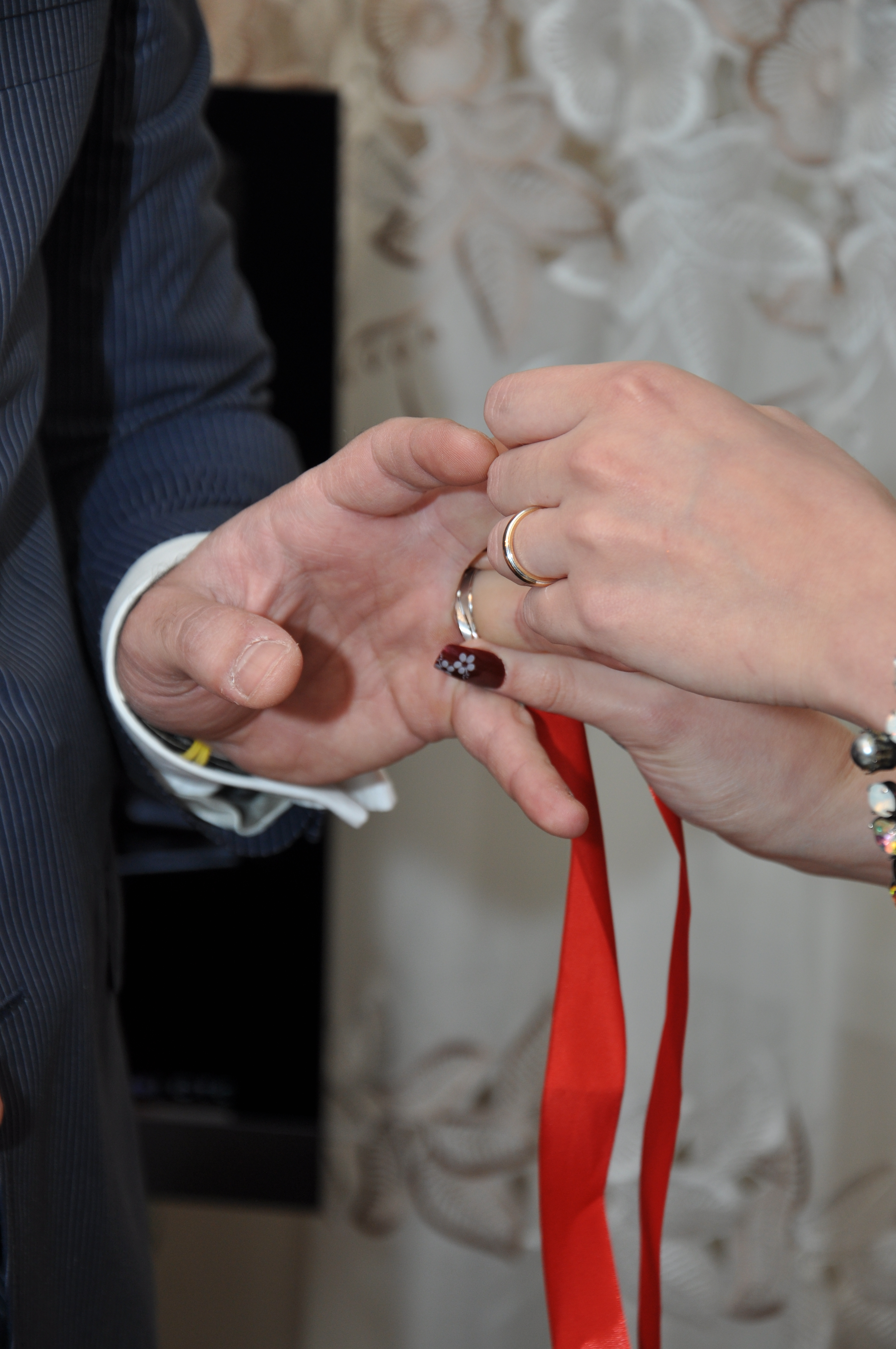
Engagement üzük taxmaq process in Azerbaijan

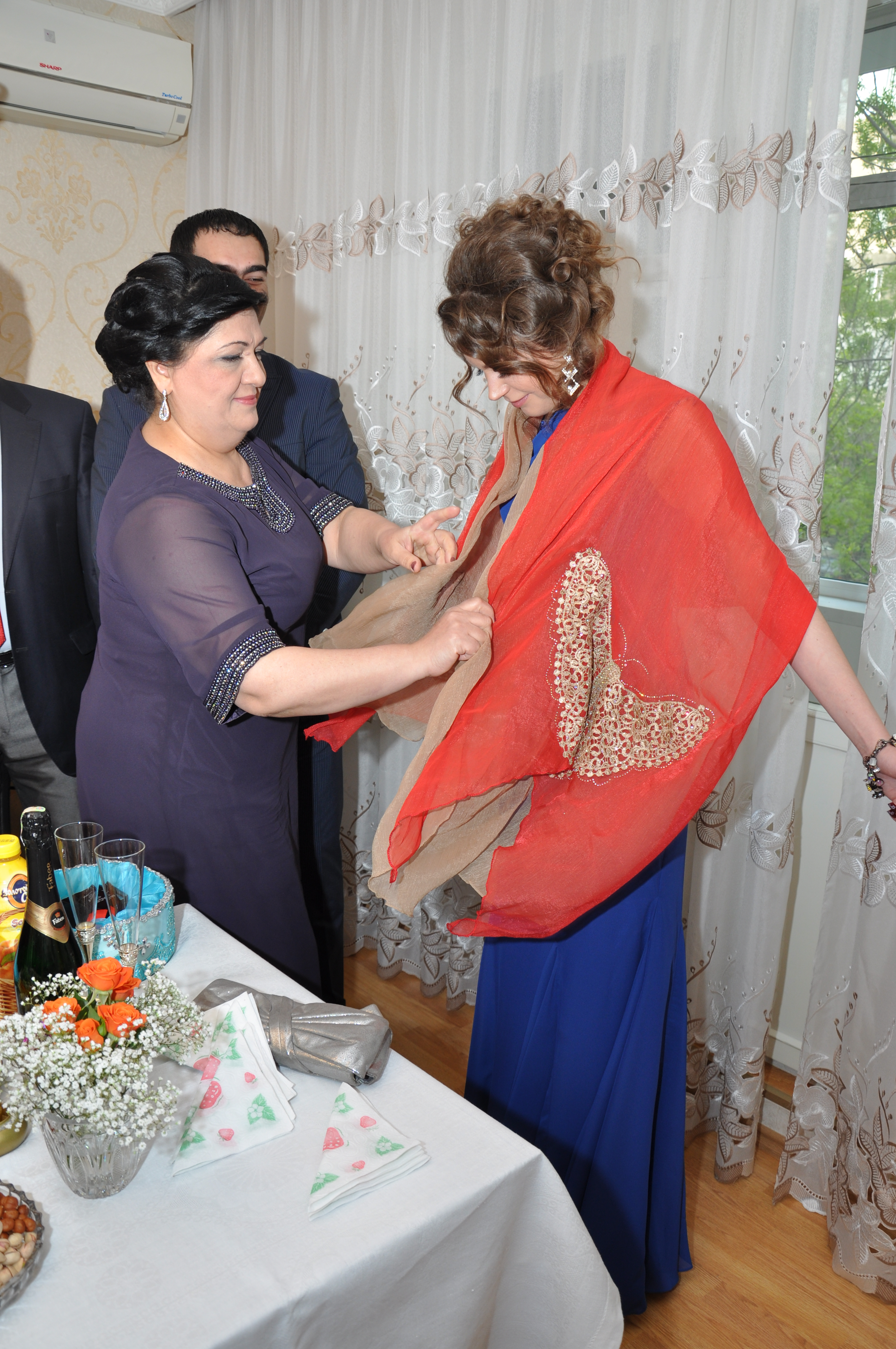
Throwing a red scarf round a bride's shoulders is an attribute of engagement in Azerbaijan

Matchmaking follows engagement traditions. After the father decides to give his daughter for marriage, the groom entertains his new relatives with tea and sweeties in the bride's house. In 1908, the engagement process of Shahsevens, an ethnic group of Azerbaijanis, was described as follows:

Shahsevens enter into marriage according to ancient traditions. If the girl's father agrees to marry his daughter off, then first of all the groom should entertain and sweeties to his new relatives in the bride's house, which is called the tradition.

The period after the engagement and before the wedding is the main period in the life of a young couple. Earlier the length of this stage was very significant, sometimes extending several years. It could be that the long span of the engagement was related to difficulties relating to material welfare and the necessities of preparing for the future wedding ceremonies. Later, this period was significantly shortened.

=== Cehiz (dowry) ===
After engagement or betrothal, the bride's family begins to prepare cehiz for their daughter's future family life. Cehiz is in the form of all the needed equipment to fill the house. Usually, the groom's family buys the house and the bride's family buys all the furniture, kitchen equipment, washing machine, vacuum cleaner and many other things needed to live inside the house. It is glorious to the bride's family to provide wealth cehiz. This is accepted as the last duty of the parents for their daughter's life.

=== Kəbin (Religious registration) ===
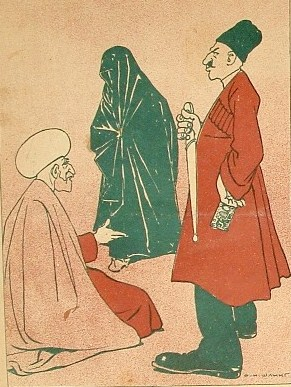
Registration of the marriage at mullah. Molla Nasraddin magazine (in Azeri), published between 1906 and 1931. Oskar Schmerling

Religious registration of the marriage (Azerbaijani: Kəbin Kəsmək) is held several days before the wedding with the participation of witnesses from both sides. A guaranteed sum (“mehr”) is written into the marriage contract (“kebin kagizi”) (Azerbaijani: Kəbin kağızı). This is a guaranteed amount of money for the bride in case of divorce or death of the husband. The amount was carefully kept by a married woman in the past.

=== Toy (Wedding) ===
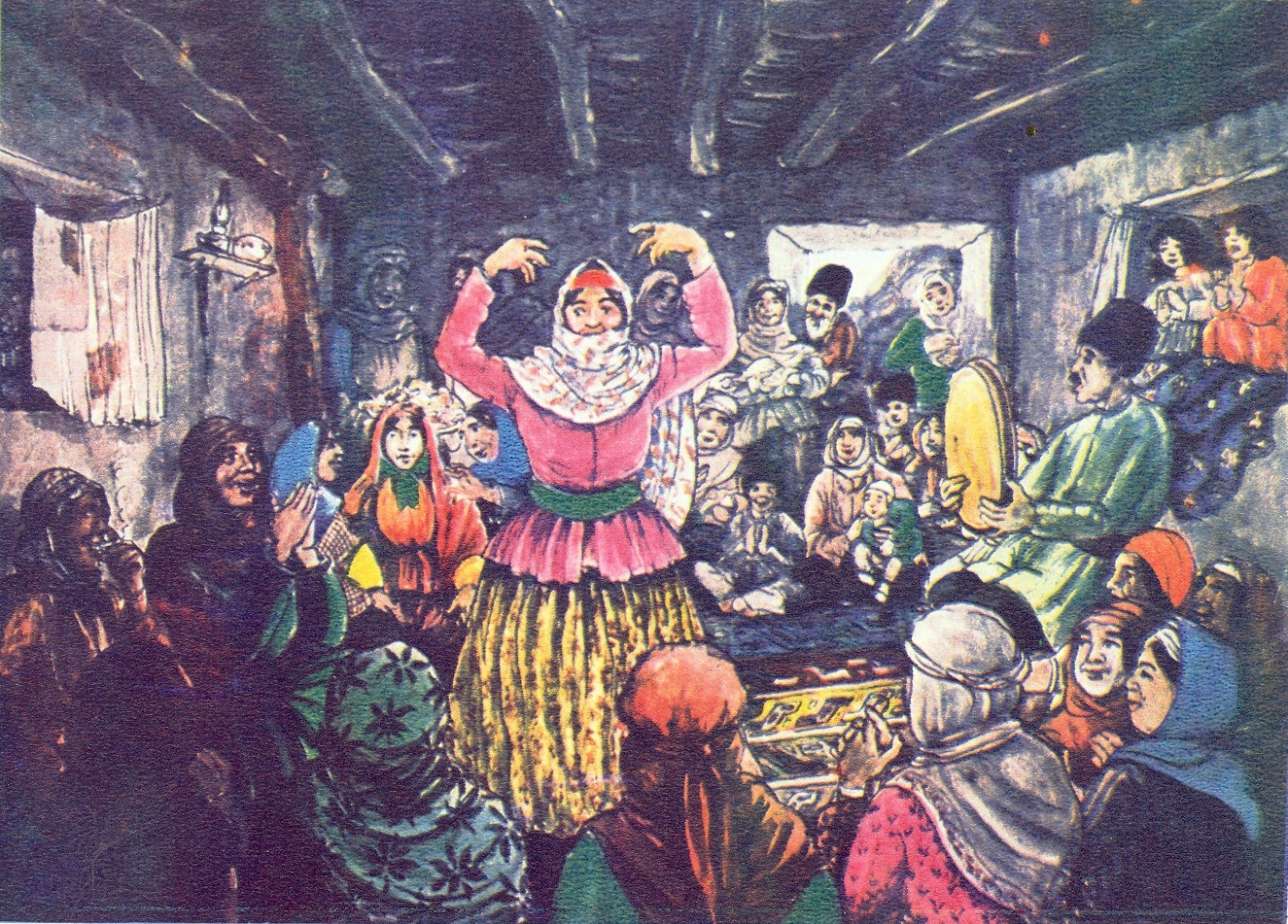
Azim Azimzade. "Wedding of the poor people". 1931

A ceremony for decorating the house (“ev bezemek”) is held a few days before the wedding. The ceremony concludes that same day when the dowry is brought to the groom's house. The aim of this tradition is to provide the young couple with all necessities at the beginning of their life together, which is why the dowry includes furniture, dishes and articles of domestic utility.

A “girl's wedding” (“paltar kesdi” ceremony) and so-called “boy's wedding” are distinguished. The national music sounds in the wedding.

=== Xınayaxdı (Henna Night) ===
A ceremony of "henna smearing" is held on the evening of the first day of the wedding at the bride's house. The bride's nearest female friends and relatives are invited to this event. A group of young boys and girls with musicians come from the groom's house. The nearest relatives of the groom smear henna on the bride's fingers and give gifts. The bride's family gives a formal dinner party to participants in the ceremony. The “henna smearing” has different names in different districts of Azerbaijan: in Shaki the ceremony is called “the bride's feast”; in Tovuz the ceremony is the “demonstration of the girl”; in Masalli and Lenkeran the events are known as “gathering at the girl's”; in Guba the reference is “henna smearing” and in Absheron this is the “hennanane”. According to tradition, on the night of “henna smearing”, the groom came to the bride's house for “toy payi” (wedding portion) and took sheep and a hen, giving gifts and money in return. According to the tradition, it is appropriate to steal “toy payi”, but in the 1980s the wedding portion was prepared in advance and given to the groom. Sometimes the musicians stay in the bride's house and merry-making and dancing continue until the morning. During the first hour, a type of traditional singing is done, called Haxışta, which involves a sort of back and forth singing between a main singer and the crowd. The traditional singing is common amongst Azerbaijanis, Talyshis, and Karapapakhs. One musician will play the same 3/4 or 2/4 rhythm, between 180bpm to 200bpm on the Qoltuq nagara or Boyuk nagara, Boyuk nagara being played most commonly in the Nakhchivan Autonomous Republic and in the Lankaran-Astara Economic Region of Azerbaijan. Here is an example; "Ağ dəvə düzdə qaldı hakışta, Yükü Təbrizdə qaldı hakışta. Oğlanı dərd apardı hakışta, Dərmanı qızda qaldı hakışta.' "https://xanim.az/hakista-823"

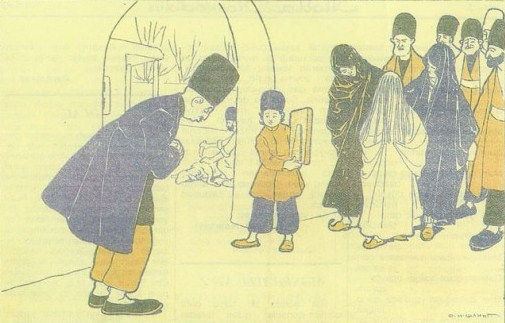
Registration of the marriage at mullah. Molla Nasraddin magazine. "Respect to the new bride". Oscar Schmerling

On the second day of the wedding, dances are held in the groom's house. Holding a “gulesh” (wrestling show) was part of the second day in some villages until now. As far back as the 1970s, this tradition existed in every village of Azerbaijan. Famous wrestlers gathered together to weight their power in the wedding. At the end of the wedding, a caravan is sent to the bride's house (nowadays-a car) to bring the bride to the groom's house (“gelin getirme”). On the way, boys detain the groom and bride and their caravan in order to receive a gift (“xelet”).

Both palms of the bride are tied with a white or red handkerchief under which they put money, which was taken by the groom and bride's yenge. The bride's hands are untied before the wedding night.

=== Uzə Çıxdı (After the wedding) ===
A ceremony called “uze çıxdı”, symbolizing the end of “absence” period, is held a few days after the wedding. In the past, according to the tradition, the bride didn't overstep the limits of a yard room for a month after the wedding. She didn't speak to her mother-in-law and father-in-law for a week. After the “uze chixdi” ceremony, the nearest relatives of the bride (except mother and father) and the groom get together in his house, greet the newlyweds, and present them with valuable gifts or money.

== Changes in the wedding ceremony ==
Despite the longstanding traditions, Azerbaijan weddings have undergone significant changes, especially since Azerbaijan gained its independence in the early 1990s. It is now widely accepted to take photos of a young couple on the wedding day, and for a bride to wear a white wedding dress. The strict concealment of a young couple before the wedding has softened. A groom, or rarely a bride, can sit at a table with guests. In recent years, grooms were given the right to participate in the engagement ceremony. These changes are notably present in city weddings. It is expected that changes will continue in village weddings in coming years. One of the modern trends is the refusal of “the wedding without newlyweds”, a tradition of hiding the bride before the wedding. The length of the marriage celebration has also been shortened. Formerly, a wedding could last for 3 or 7 days, but now it lasts for a day.
