= Halay =

Turkish and Kurdish folk dance, Turkey's national dance

Halay is the national dance of Turkey. It refers to all traditional circular and line dances performed across the country. The term is used among Turks, Kurds, Arabs, and Asia Minor Greeks (particularly Pontic Greeks, Karamanlides, and Cappadocian Greeks).

Circular and line dances in Turkey are commonly performed at weddings and festive gatherings, traditionally accompanied by the zurna and davul, or sometimes by the singing of the dancers themselves. In recent years, electronic instruments have increasingly been used in place of traditional musical instruments. Halay dancers typically form a circle or a line, holding each other by the fingers, hands, or shoulders. The first and last dancers may also hold a handkerchief known as a mendil. These dances usually begin slowly and gradually speed up in tempo, and their name, style, and musical characteristics vary from one town or village to another.

== History and etymology ==
=== History ===
The term halay is derived from a Pontic Greek folk dance called "Χαλάι" (Khalái), who emerged in Central Anatolia (Cappadocia) in the early 20th century when Pontic Greek miners migrated from the Eastern Black Sea to the district of Akdağmadeni in Yozgat Province. The name of the dance was taken from the refrain of a Turkish folk song popular among the community that accompanied the dance, suggesting that these Pontic Greeks were Turkish-speaking.

It was a slow-paced, semi-circular dance, characterized by intense bending movements and rhythmic foot strikes. Dancers would start with their right foot, taking the first three steps diagonally to the right. On the fourth step, they would extend their feet toward the center of the circle, then step backward with the left foot on the fifth step, placing the toe inward and the heel outward. They would return to the position of the fourth step on the sixth step, then repeat the sequence, moving in unison to the accompaniment of musical instruments, such as the violin, oud, zurna and davul.

The dance soon became widely recognized among other communities in Cappadocia, who began using the term to refer to all circular and line folk dances throughout the country. Variants later spread to the provinces of Sivas, Çorum, Kayseri, and other areas of northern Cappadocia, each developing distinct local characteristics while maintaining the fundamental structure and rhythm of the original dance.

The historical documentation of halay dates back to the early 20th century. The earliest known written definition of the word halay appears in the 1932 ethnographic compilation Anadilden Derlemeler by Hamit Zübeyir Koşay and İshak Işıtman, where halay is defined as a hand-held line dance from Central Anatolia, accompanied by the zurna and davul. However, an earlier reference to the dance itself, explicitly identified as halay, is found in the 1928 edition of Dârülelhan Külliyatı: Anadolu Halk Şarkıları, which includes a record of the folk dance Çenber (also spelled Çember or Çemberim) from the Sivas Province, listed under this designation.

In Azerbaijan, a similar dance is known as "Yalli." It is a common traditional chain and circle dance of Azerbaijan, traditionally danced all across areas inhabited by Azerbaijanis, however now not danced traditionally and specifically due to Rural-Urban migration. A large loss of knowledge of different choreographies and regional playing styles has occurred in Azerbaijan. It is most commonly danced in Nakhchivan. Regional styles include Köçəri, Höynəri, Xələfi, Baharı, Şərili, Qazı-Qazı, Çöpü-çöpü, and Göyçəməni, (Dances of Sharur). Others include Gülümey and Tənzərə (Dances of Ordubad), and Qarabağ and Cəngi (Dances of Karabakh). Other variations are observed in the Qazakh, Qobustan and Shaki regions. The Boyuk nagara and Zurna are used for the dances, and sometimes the Qoltuq nagara. There are 3,500-year-old petroglyphs of Yalli in the Gobustan Rock Art Cultural Landscape area.

The Karapapakhs of Borchali and Shirak also practice halay, and two variations are famous, Aghbaba and Tarakama. The Tarakama form is also known as Borchali. The Boyuk nagara, Balaban and Zurna are used to play the music.

=== Etymology ===
Halay comes from the Turkish word alay, meaning “group”, “crowd”, or "celebration", and in this context, "a large number of people gathered together for a ceremony or demonstration". The Turkish alay originates from the Byzantine Greek term alágion (αλάγιον).

An alternate etymology has been proposed by Sevan Nişanyan in his Etymological Dictionary of Contemporary Turkish suggesting that halay originates from the Kurdish (Kurmanji) word hildan, meaning "to lift". However, on 24 July 2022, Nişanyan put doubt on this revealing that he doesn't know the origin of the word.

Although commonly known by its Turkish name halay, this category of folk dance is also referred to by different names among other ethnic groups in Turkey: govend or dîlan in Kurdish, ḥiggā (ܚܓܐ) in Syriac, yallı in Azerbaijani, and šurǰpar (Շուրջպար) in Armenian.

== Examples of halay ==
- Khalái (danced by Asia Minor Greeks)
- Elazığ dik halay (danced by Turks and Kurds)
- Üç Ayak (danced by Turks)
- Kaba (danced by Turks)
- Afshar (danced by Turks)
- Halabi (danced by Turks, Kurds, and Arabs)
- Dunnik (danced by Kurds)
- Yallı (danced by Azerbaijanis)
- Tamzara (danced by Armenians)
- Tənzərə (danced by Azerbaijanis and Kurds)

== See also ==
- Middle Eastern dance
- Assyrian folk dance
- Attan (danced by Afghans)
- Dabke (danced by Levantines)
- Dîlan (danced by Kurds)
- Faroese dance
- Horon (danced by Pontic Greek, Laz, and Turkish peoples)
- Kolo (danced by Southern Slavs)
- Ohuokhai (danced by Sakha Turks)
- Sirtaki (danced by Greeks)
- Kochari (danced by Armenians and Azerbaijanis)
- Tamzara (danced by Armenians and Azerbaijanis)
