= Mah-e Asal =

Mah-e Asal or Māh-e Asal (Persian: ماه عسل) is the Iranian honeymoon, and may refer to:

- Mah-e Asal (TV series)
- Mah-e Asal (1976 film) by Fereydun Gole
- Mah-e Asal (1978 book) by Gholam-Hossein Sa'edi
