= Kâni Karaca =

Turkish music artist (1930–2004)

- Born: 1 March 1930; Karataş, Adana, Turkey
- Died: 29 May 2004 (aged 74) Fatih, Istanbul, Turkey
- Genres: Religious music; Classical Turkish music
- Occupation: Hafız
- Years active: 1940s–1990s

Kâni Karaca (1 March 1930 – 29 May 2004) was a Turkish performer of religious and non-religious musical works. Born in the village of Karataş, Adana, Turkey, he became blind when he was just two months old due to an accident. He memorized the Quran in elementary school. He came to Istanbul in 1950. He worked with Sadettin Heper, and learned religious and nonreligious music from him.

Karaca was married and had three children. He died of cancer at his home in Fatih, Istanbul, on 29 May 2004 at the age of 74. The following day, he was buried in the Edirnekapı cemetery after the funeral prayers in the Fatih mosque.

== Recordings ==
- Kalan Müzik
