= Yaylı tambur =

Long-neck lute from Turkey

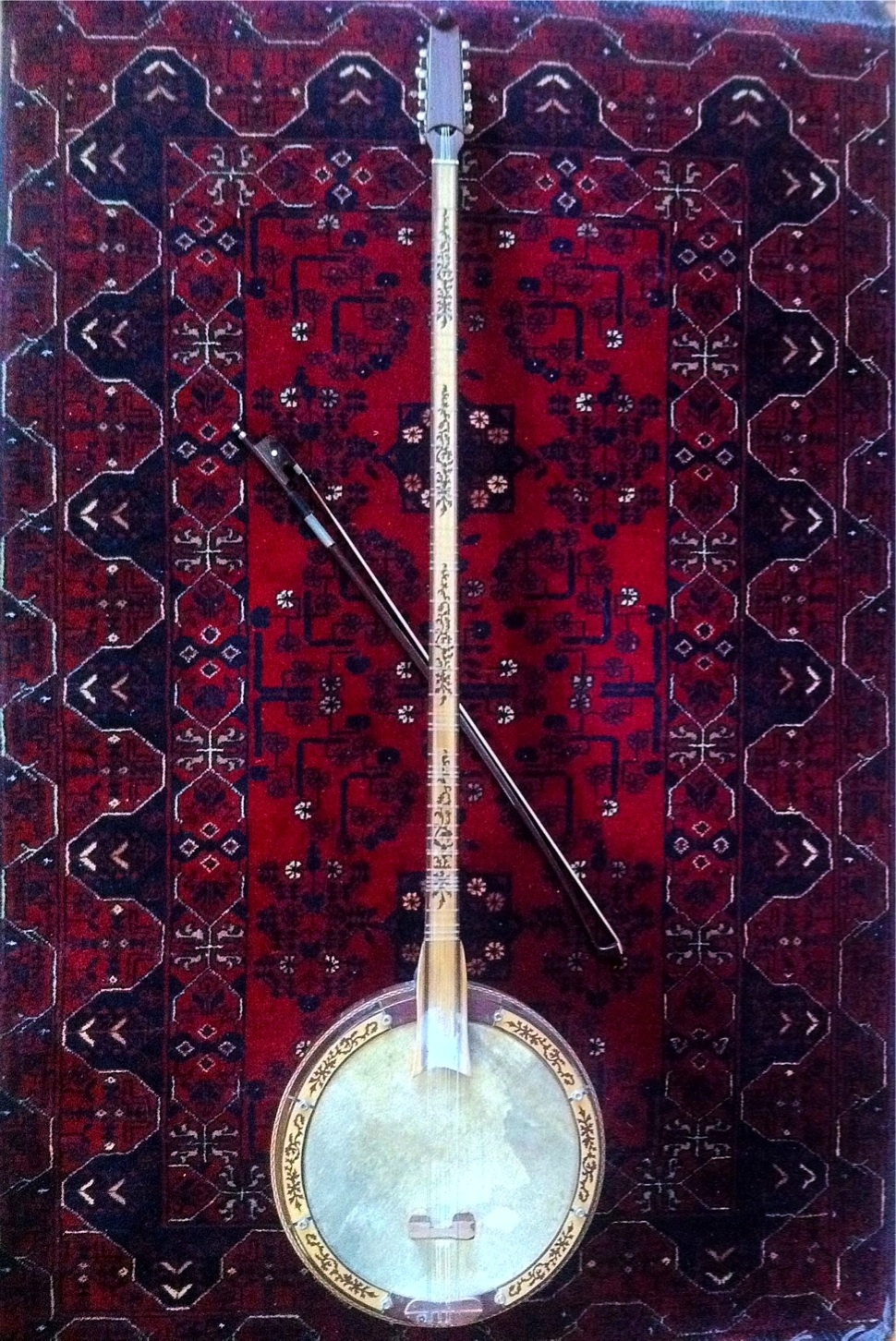
- Classification: Bowed string instrument

The yaylı tambur is a bowed long-neck lute from Turkey. Derived from the older plucked mızraplı tambur variant of the Turkish tambur, it has a long, fretted neck and a round metal or wooden soundbox which is often covered on the front with a skin or acrylic head similar to that of a banjo.

The instrument is held vertically, with the soundbox resting in the player's lap or between the calves or it can be worn on a strap. The bow is grasped sideways, with the little, ring and middle fingers pressing on the horsehairs, while the thumb and index fingers hold the rightmost wooden edge of the bow or it can be held overhand like a Cello Bow to allow for more expressiveness. The leftmost strings of the instrument unite into a single course to form a doubled-string which is tuned to a unison that is lifted slightly from the bridge. This is where all melodic playing takes place. The rest are sympathetic strings numbering from 4 to 6 which are tuned to the octave, fifth and/or fourth of the main doubled-string.

Due to the special nature of the instrument, the neck behaves as though it was unfretted despite the ordinary placement of numerous frets (anywhere from 24 to 34 or more to the octave). That is to say, the fingers can press down on unfretted parts of the neck to achieve the same effect as stopping the frets. This allows the glissandi and portamenti to be executed flawlessly which constitute the primary characteristics of the yaylı tambur. Moreover, the frets can be moved about depending on the tastes and choices of the player to achieve correct intonation of a given makam.

Dr. Ozan Yarman has proposed an alternate 24-tone tuning and fretting for the tambur that he has applied to his own instrument, which replaces the Arel-Ezgi-Uzdilek tone-system in use for Turkish Art music while also relying on the same array of accustomed microtonal accidentals to notate.

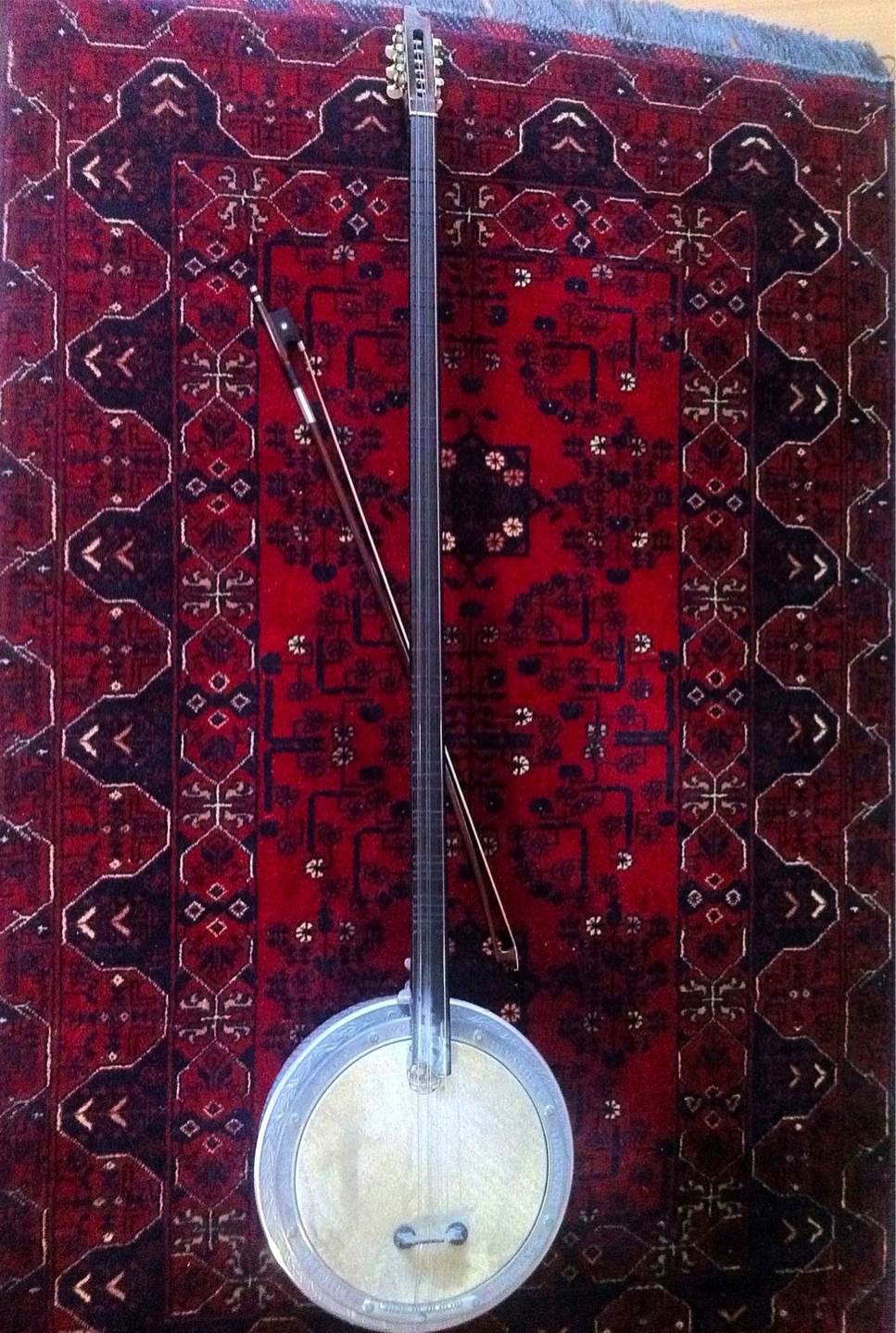
Cümbüş Tambur of Dr. Ozan Yarman

Cümbüş Tambur recording Dr. Ozan Yarman

Wooden Yaylı Tambur recording Dr. Ozan Yarman

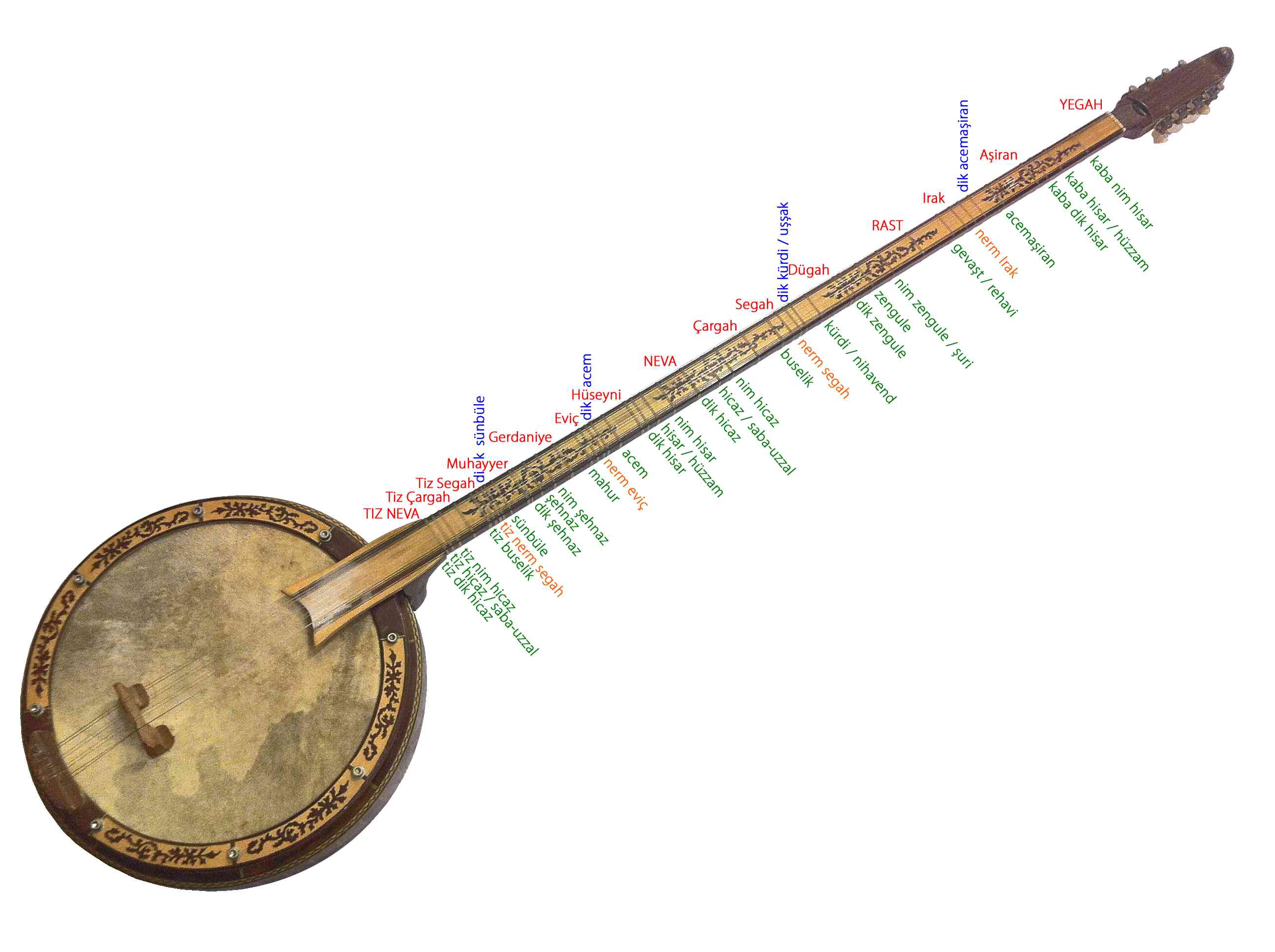
The diagram shows Yarman-24 tuning fret positions and names on a bowed tambur prepared by Dr. Oz. (www.ozanyarman.com) representing both the fifths cycle of 17-tones and the 12-tone Modified Meantone Temperament core cycle, which yield the 22 pitches out of 24 per octave. The remaining blue colored pitches are extra-cyclic.

== See also ==
- Turkish musical instruments
- Music of Turkey
- Gusle
- Igil
- Kemenche
- Morin khuur
