= Sadettin Heper =

- Born: 1899; Eyüp, Istanbul, Turkey
- Died: 1980 (aged 80–81)
- Genres: Mevlevi music and Ottoman classical music
- Instrument: kudüm (Turkish small kettle drum)
- Labels: Kalan, Atlantic Records

Sadettin Heper (1899–1980) was a composer of Turkish music considered as an important link to the world of Turkish Mevlevi music before the foundation of the Turkish Republic in 1923.

== Biography ==
He was born in the Eyüp neighborhood of Istanbul as the son of Halit Efendi and Zehra Hanim. Until the religious venues where the Mevlevis practiced were closed in 1924 due to the prevailing secular ideology, he played the kudüm, a percussion instrument, in Mevlevi religious ceremonies. Later, he worked for the Istanbul Municipality Conservatory. He regularly performed on the kudüm drum at ceremonies commemorating Mevlana in Konya when the government lifted the restrictions for these occasions. He published a complete set of Mevlevi ayin (music and words for the ceremonies), including translations from the original Persian texts into Turkish. He died in Eyüp.

He started his musical studies under Ahmed Irsoy, from whom he learned over a thousand religious and nonreligious songs. He learned the Ney from Hakkı Dede. He was educated in the traditional school of Turkish music which was learned from teacher to student. He was against the theoretical approach formed by scholars Arel, Ezgi and Uzdilek (the so-called Arel-Ezgi-Uzdilek system). He composed over 15 songs and taught many important musicians, including Kâni Karaca, Aziz Bahriyeli, Hüseyin Top, and Ahmet Özhan.
