= Armudu =

Type of drinking glass used for black tea in Azerbaijan

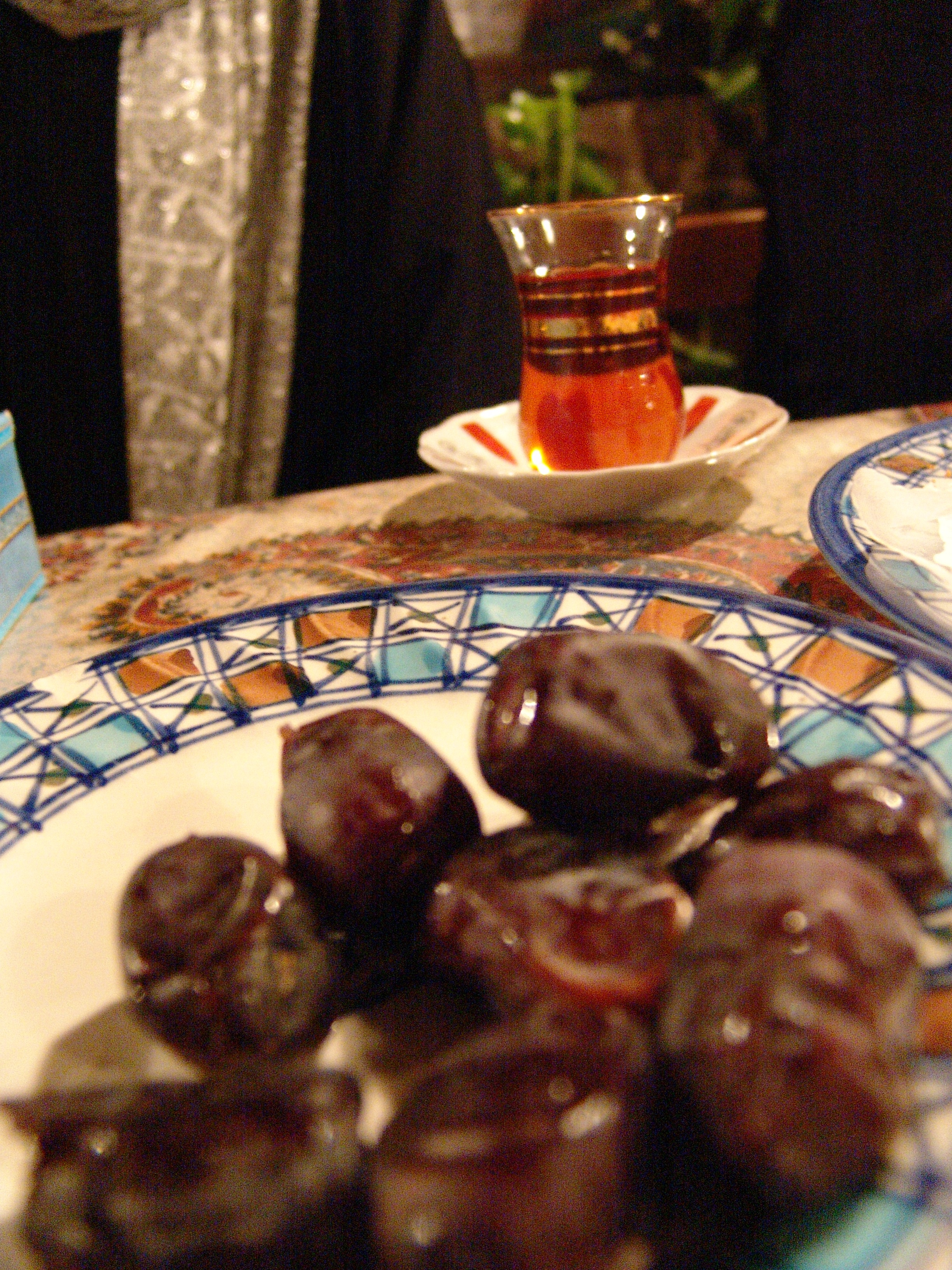
Azeri tea in Armudu stəkan

Armudu or Armudu stəkan (Armudu glass), sometimes called Boğmalı is a kind of drinking glass used for black tea in Azerbaijan. It is similar to the Turkish traditional tea glass called ince belli bardak (lit. "slim-waisted glass") (see also Tea in Turkey).

== Introduction ==
Azerbaijani tea is usually served first when a host receives guests. Tea serving and drinking is an important component of Azerbaijani culture. Armudu, which translates as "in the shape of a pear", or Boğmalı, which translates as "narrow", as it is also called, suggests the shape of a pear and is sometimes associated with the figure of a hostess in Azerbaijani culture.

The Armudu is made from a variety of materials: glass, porcelain, faience, and silver. Besides its aesthetic qualities, the Armudu also has thermophysical advantages. The narrower middle portion of the glass does not allow the hot liquid in the bottom of the glass to flow upwards but returns the warm flow to the bottom. This allows the tea to remain hot until it is consumed in full.

The Armudu tea glasses are often 100 grams in weight. The tea is poured into the glass but not up to the top. Usually a gap of 1–2 cm, which is called "dodaq yeri" ("place for lips" in Azerbaijani), is left for the consumer's lips for comfortable drinking.

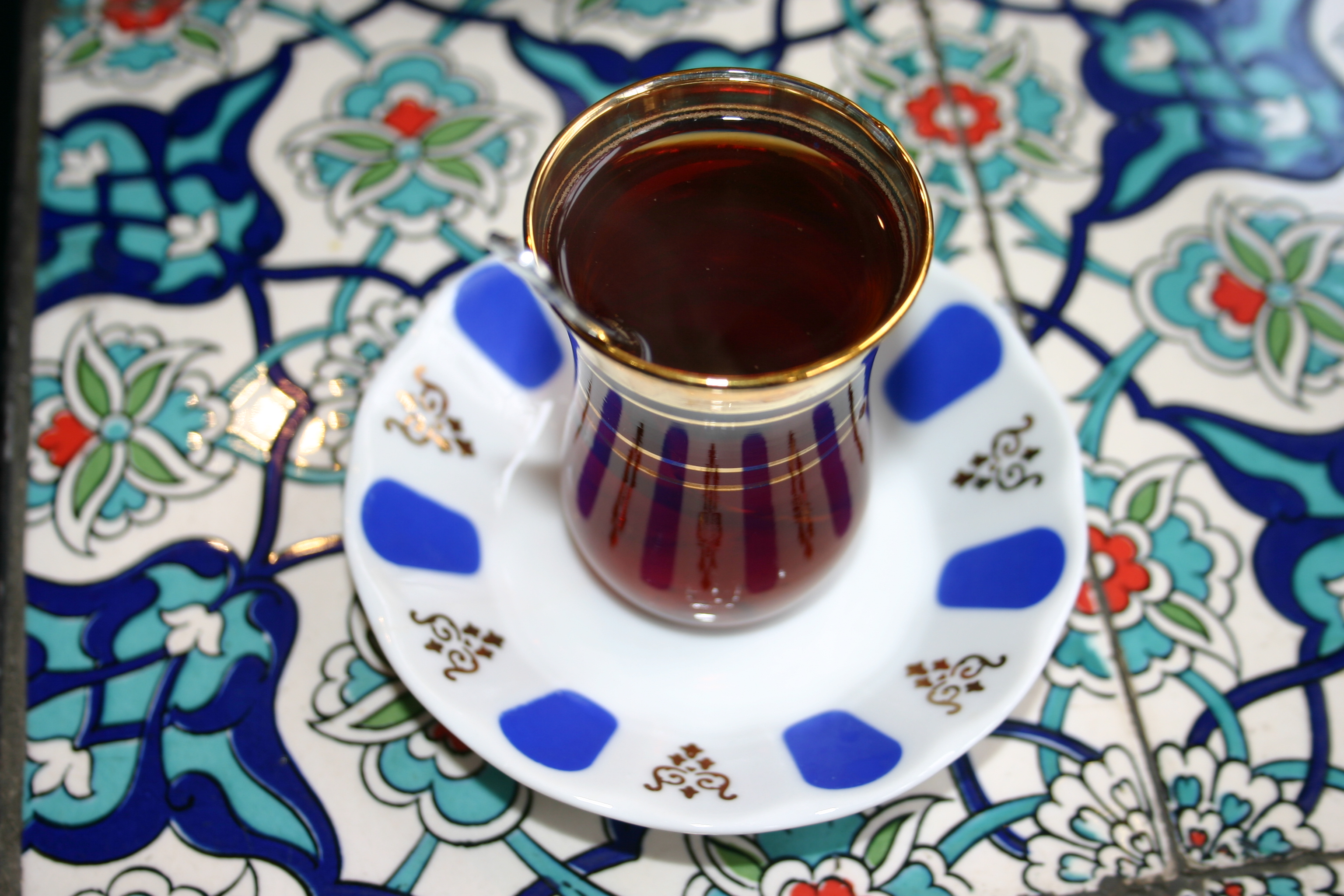

== Shape ==
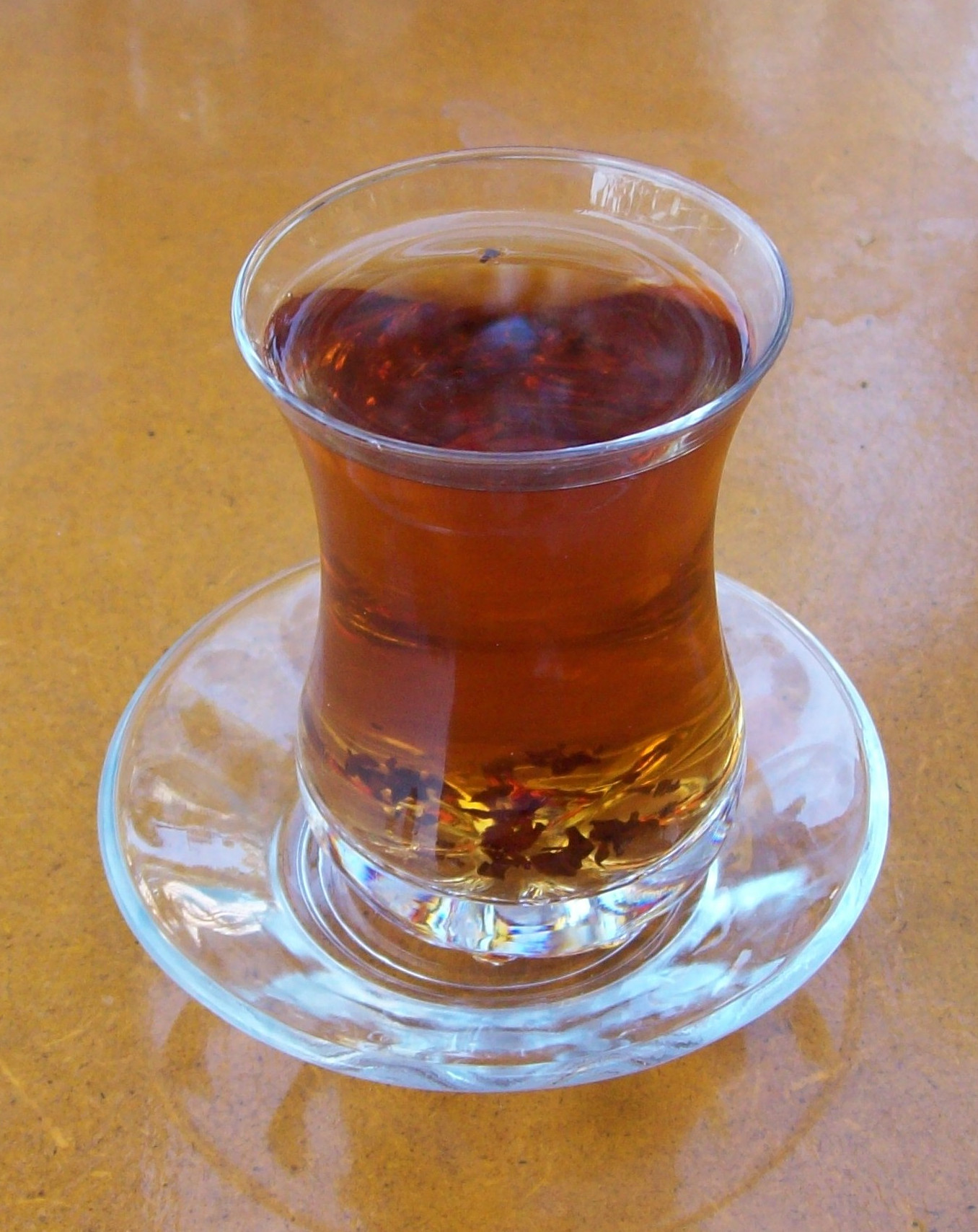
Armudu

There are three reasons why the shape of the glass matters. Firstly, this type of glass is easy to hold because its top edge is wider than the middle, which prevents it from slipping out of hands. Secondly, because the top part becomes less hot, it prevents burning one's hands. Thirdly, it has been argued that, unlike regular glasses and cups, in which hot liquids cool evenly, the Armudu ensures proportional cooling at the time of drinking allowing cooling of the tea in the top portion of the glass while keeping the bottom part hot.

== See also ==
- Azerbaijani tea culture
- Piyāla
- Turkish tea
- Samovar
- Ayran
- Turkish coffee
