= Iranian wedding =

Persian wedding traditions

Iranian wedding (Persian: مراسم عروسی در ایران), also known as Persian wedding, consists of traditions rooted in Zoroastrianism, the primary religion of pre-Islamic Iran. Though the concepts and theories of marriage have been changed by Islamic traditions, the ceremonies have remained more or less the same as they were originally in pre-Islamic Iran. Although modern-day Iran is a multi-ethnic country (see also Azeri wedding), Iranian wedding traditions are embraced by the majority of ethnic groups in Iran.

== Before the wedding ==
=== Khastegāri (courtship) ===
Khastegāri (Persian: خواستگاری) is the first step of the traditional Iranian courtship process. In pre-modern times, when it was time for a young man to get married, his family would look for potential brides who came from families of similar standing in the community. Once the man, or his family, had decided on a potential bride, the Khastegāri process would take place.

For this ceremony, one or more representatives of the man's family would visit the woman's family. The first visit could be for the parties to become acquainted. At each visit, the man's family would present a bouquet of flowers and the women, as good hostesses, would provide tea, fruits and sweets. Both the woman and the man had their say in whether or not they would like a follow-up on the visits. Once both parties had established serious intentions for the relationship, the man's family would bring sweets and a larger bouquet and officially pop the question.

In modern Iran, this practice is initiated by the man and woman and their mutual decision to start the Khastegāri (courtship) process. The Khastegāri is a one-time formality and it serves to inform the parents of the decision and have their thoughts shared in the process.

=== Baleh Boroon ===
Baleh Boroon (Persian: بله برون) or the ‘exchange of promise to marry’, is the ceremony which takes place shortly after the formal proposal, publicly announcing the couple's intention to form a union. At this stage, both the to-be-bride and groom are in agreement and, traditionally, both their families have agreed to the union and any conditions concerning the marriage. Historically, the baleh-boroon was an occasion attended by elders and close relatives, in which the families became acquainted, discussion of wedding details take place, and formally confirm the engagement.

The groom's parents usually give a gift to the bride at this ceremony. According to an ancient Zoroastrian practice, this is done by the groom's family to persuade the bride to accept the proposal. The traditional gift is a ring.

"Bale Boroon" significance: strengthens family bonds, confirms commitment, and begins wedding preparations.

=== Shopping before the wedding day ===
Typically, before formalizing their marriage, the bride and groom—either alone or accompanied by their mothers—select their wedding rings. These rings are often elaborate, particularly for women, who typically prefer designs adorned with diamonds. An important aspect of Iranian culture is the "jewelry set", which the groom (or his family) is responsible for purchasing. This set is gifted to the bride upon signing the marriage contract. Often, the bride and groom will choose this jewelry set on the same day they buy their wedding rings.

In Iranian culture, a jewelry set typically consists of matching pieces that complement each other and are designed for special occasions. This set usually includes:

Necklace: A decorative piece that can vary in style and size. Earrings: Often matching the necklace, these can be studs, drops, or more elaborate designs. Bracelet: A piece that can be simple or intricate, depending on personal taste. Ring: Sometimes included as part of the set, often designed to match the other pieces. Other Accessories: Depending on the family and regional customs, the set might also include items like a brooch or a tiara.

The jewelry is typically made of gold and may feature gemstones, such as diamonds or other precious stones, enhancing its beauty and value. The set is seen as a significant gift from the groom to the bride, symbolizing commitment and celebration of their union.

Additionally, silver mirror and candleholders are other expenses that the groom or his family must cover prior to the wedding.

=== Hanā Bandān (Henna Night) ===
Hana Bandān (Persian: حنابندان) (henna ceremony) is the ceremony held one day before the wedding in the house of either the bride or the groom, but It generally takes place at the bride's house and among women. Usually dry henna brought by the bridegroom's family is broken into pieces in a silver or copper vessel by a woman whose parents are alive, and still together. After preparing the bride, a veil ornamented with red flakes is placed over her head, and she is brought into the middle with hymn and folk songs about henna.

Henna that has earlier kneaded with water is brought in on a tray surrounded by candles and placed in the middle of the room. In some places, the henna is first put on the hands of the bride and then distributed to the guests; in other areas the henna is first distributed to the guests, and only after everybody has left is it placed on the bride's hands. If the woman so wishes, henna can also be placed on her feet and hair.

Considerable attention is paid to charging a woman with a happy marriage to knead and distribute the henna and apply it to the girl's hand. The woman places the henna on one of the bride's hands, and a young girl places it on the other. Before the henna is applied, coins or gold are also placed in her hands. After the woman who came for dyeing henna leaves, a close friend of the bride remain with her and they enjoy themselves till morning.

=== Shirini Khorān ===
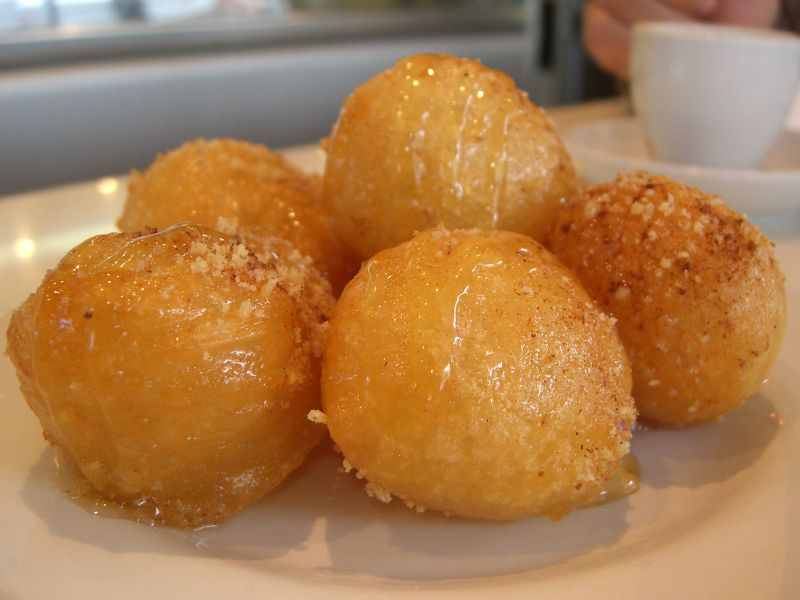
Iranian Bamiyeh.

It is traditional to eat Bamiyeh in the Shirini-Khoran. The sharing of refreshments that follows the Nāmzadi ceremony (Persian: شیرینی خوران translation: eating sweets). In this ceremony, tea and Iranian desserts such as bāmiyeh (light doughnut balls), nān-e berenji (rice flour cookies), chocolates, and ājil (nuts and dried fruit), are served as part of the festivities. Eating sweets at celebratory events such as an engagement ceremony carries symbolism such as wishing for sweetness in the couple's life.

=== Jahāz Barān ===
The Jahāz Barān (Persian: جهازبران), also known as Tabaq Barān (Persian: طبق بران), ceremony takes place a few days before the wedding, presents from the bride's family are taken over to the groom's house. Men from the groom's family dressed up in festive costumes carry the presents on elaborately decorated large flat containers carried on their heads. The containers are called tabaq (Persian: طبق). Although this tradition might be practised in small towns and villages, in cities such as Tehran, an alternative mean of transportation is used to deliver the gifts to the bride.

== Wedding ==
=== Sofreh Aghd (wedding table) ===
There is a very elaborate floor spread set up for Aghd, including several kinds of food and decorations, this is called Sofreh Aghd (Persian: سفره عقد). Items in the table include:

- The Herbs: Khashkhash (poppy seeds), Berenj (rice), Sabzi Khoshk (Angelica), salt, Raziyane (Nigella seeds), Cha'i (black tea leaves) and Kondor (Frankincense).
- The Pastries: Noghl, Baklava, Toot (Iranian marzipan), Naan-e Bereneji (rice cookies), Naan-e Badami (almond cookies) and Naan-Nokhodchi (chickpea cookie) are placed on the spread and traditionally served to the guests after the ceremony.
- Mirror of Fate and two candelabras, symbols of light and fire. When the bride enters the room she has her veil covering her face. Once the bride sits beside the bridegroom she removes her veil and the first thing that the bridegroom sees in the mirror should be the reflection of his wife-to-be.
- The Blessed Bread: A specially baked bread with calligraphy written on it.
- "Naan-o Paneer-o Sabzi": Bread, feta cheese, and greens are also placed on the spread to symbolize the basic food that is needed to sustain life. They are traditionally served to guests after the ceremony.
- Symbols of Fertility: decorated eggs, almonds, walnuts and hazelnuts.
- The Heavenly Fruits: pomegranates, grapes, apples.
- Coins: A bowl of gold or silver coins representing wealth and prosperity.
- The Sacred Text: The Avesta, Qur'an, Bible, or Torah is placed in front of the couple on the spread. Some families also add a poetry book such as Rumi's Diwan-e Shams-e Tabrizi, Hafez's Divan, or the Shahnameh by Ferdowsi.
- Prayer Rug: A prayer rug (Jaa-ye Namaaz) or a traditional Iranian Termeh is placed in the center of the wedding spread. The spreadprayer rug, open in the Aghd-cloth is to remind the couple of the importance of prayer to God. The prayer carpet also includes a small cube of clay with prayers written on it (Mohr) and a rosary (Tasbih). Non-Muslim families may or may not omit the prayer kit.

A scarf or shawl made out of silk or any other fine fabric is held over the bride and bridegroom's heads (who are sitting by the Sofreh) by a few unmarried female relatives (bridesmaids). Two sugar cones made out of hardened sugar are used during the ceremony. These sugar cones are softly ground together above the bride and bridegroom's heads by a happily married female relative (and/or maid of honor) throughout the ceremony to shower them in sweetness. The sugar drops in the held fabric, not on their heads.

== After the wedding ==
=== Pātakhti ===
Traditionally, on Pātakhti (Persian: پاتختی) the bride wears a lot of floral ornaments and the decoration of the house with flowers is provided by the groom's family. It is similar to American Bridal shower. The relatives of the bride and the groom bring them presents. This is usually more of a party with finger foods, sweets and drink than a sit-down dinner. The majority of the night is spent dancing and socializing.

=== Pagoshā ===
Pagoshā (Persian: پاگشا), (literally open leg) is a gesture of acceptance and open arms. It is a ceremony held in the house of the newly married couple's relatives. In Iran, where families are a lot bigger and there are more of them around to throw parties, it is usually a very exciting and/or exhausting time for families of the bride and the groom who are invited to one Pagosha after another for several weeks following a wedding.

=== Mādarzan Salām ===
Mādarzan Salām (Persian: مادرزن سلام) literally “hello mother in law” is generally the morning after the wedding ceremony when groom visits his mother in law and presents her with a gift.

=== Mah-e Asal (Iranian Honeymoon) ===
Mah-e Asal (Persian: ماه عسل) is a vacation spent together by a newly married couple. Northern provinces of Iran such as Mazanderan, Golestan and Gilan are very popular honeymoon destinations. In recent years cities of Turkish Riviera such as Antalya and Alanya have been attracting more Iranian newlyweds because of no visa requirement between Iran and Turkey.
