= Azerbaijani tea culture =

Tea in Azerbaijan is served freshly brewed, hot and strong. It typically has a bright colour and is served in crystal or any other glasses or cups. Azerbaijanis often use traditional armudu (pear-shaped) glass. Tea is served continuously when there are guests or when there is an interesting conversation. For Azerbaijanis tea with milk is uncommon. According to a common belief, drinking tea with lump sugar instead of sand sugar comes from the medieval period, when rulers who were afraid of being poisoned checked their tea by dunking a piece of sugar in a beverage (it was believed that the poison would react to the sugar). Traditional tea is served with lemon, cube sugar, sweets and fruit desserts (not jam). Sometimes thyme, mint or rose water is added, which is believed to be good for the stomach and heart.

For Azerbaijanis tea is associated with warmth and hospitality; tradition says that one should not allow the guest to leave the house without at least one cup of tea.

Tea in Azerbaijan is also served during matchmaking. After the negotiations by matchmakers are complete, the maid will bring out tea. If the tea is served without sugar, that is a sign that the chances for marriage agreement are very low; conversely, if tea is served with sugar, it means that there will be a wedding.

== Chaykhana ==
Azerbaijani people may drink tea in traditional tea houses called chaykhana (from Classical Persian چایخانه). Men sit in a chaykhana, playing backgammon (nard), reading newspapers and drinking tea. Historically, Azeri women did not go to public places, so chaykhana used to be a place for men.

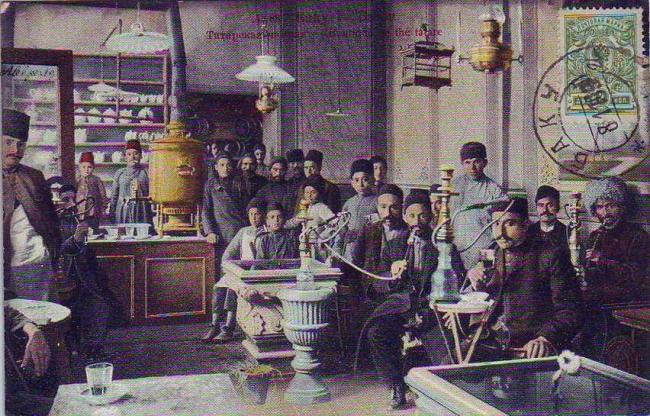
Chaykhana (tea house) in Baku, 1888

== Modern history ==
Historically, tea production used to be one of the main industries in Azerbaijan. Although the first tea bushes were commercially grown in Azerbaijan as early as 1912, tea-growing gained commercial value in the 1930s under Soviet rule. In 1934, specialists from Moscow visited Lankaran and took samples of the soil. They analyzed the samples and found that Lankaran is one of the most fructuous areas for tea growing. Since that time, tea factories have been operating in Lankaran and neighbouring regions. From then on, Lankaran became the main area in Azerbaijan for the cultivation of rice, tea, citrus fruit and vegetables.

In the 1980s, tea-production peaked up in the Azerbaijan Soviet Socialist Republic. Approximately, 34–38,000 tonnes of tea leaves were harvested annually at that time. However, tea production decreased as a result of the fall of the former Soviet Union. In 2007–2008, less than 500 tonnes were harvested and it was the lowest point.

== Tea drinking traditions ==
In Azerbaijan, people drink tea from the special glass called “armudu” (literally pear-like glass) and is associated with the figure of a hostess in Azerbaijani culture. Tea is served with various delicious sweets, fruit jam and sliced lemon.

== Samovar tea ==
In Azerbaijan, people boil water in heated metal containers known as samovars. Archaeologist Tufan Akhundov found a pottery samovar, possibly up to 3,600 years old, in Sheki a town located at the foothills of the Caucasus.
