= Kus =

Persian musical instrument

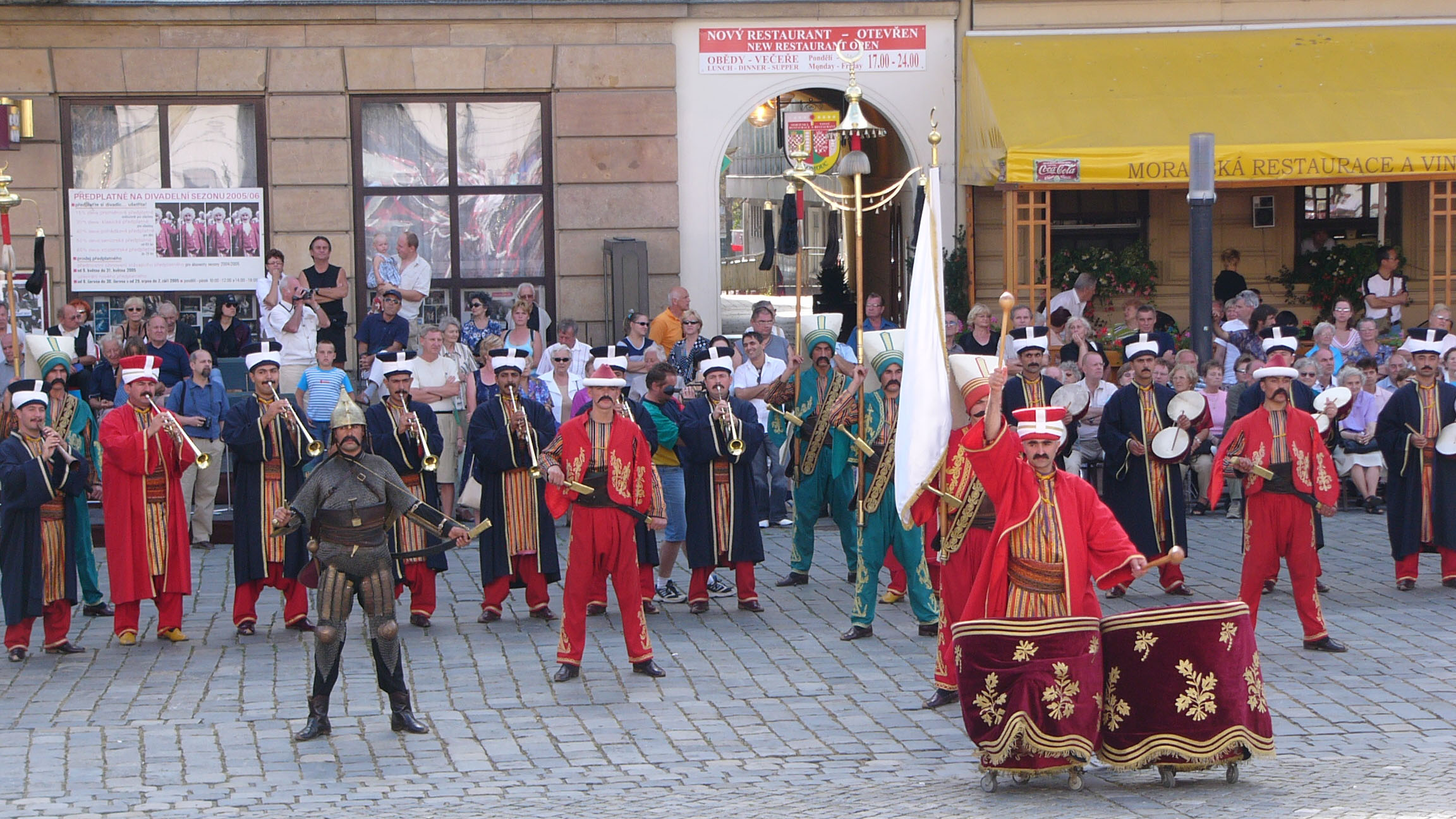
- Classification: Percussion instrument

More articles or information
- Timpani; Naqareh; Naker

A Kus (Persian کوس kūs) is an ancient Persian musical instrument, a large kettledrum similar to timpani.

== Etymology ==
Kus is a Middle-Persian military term meaning "march". According to Von Mohl the term was Kūša, apparently borrowed from Aramaic, probably during the Arsacid dynasty (248 BCE-224 CE).

== Historical background ==
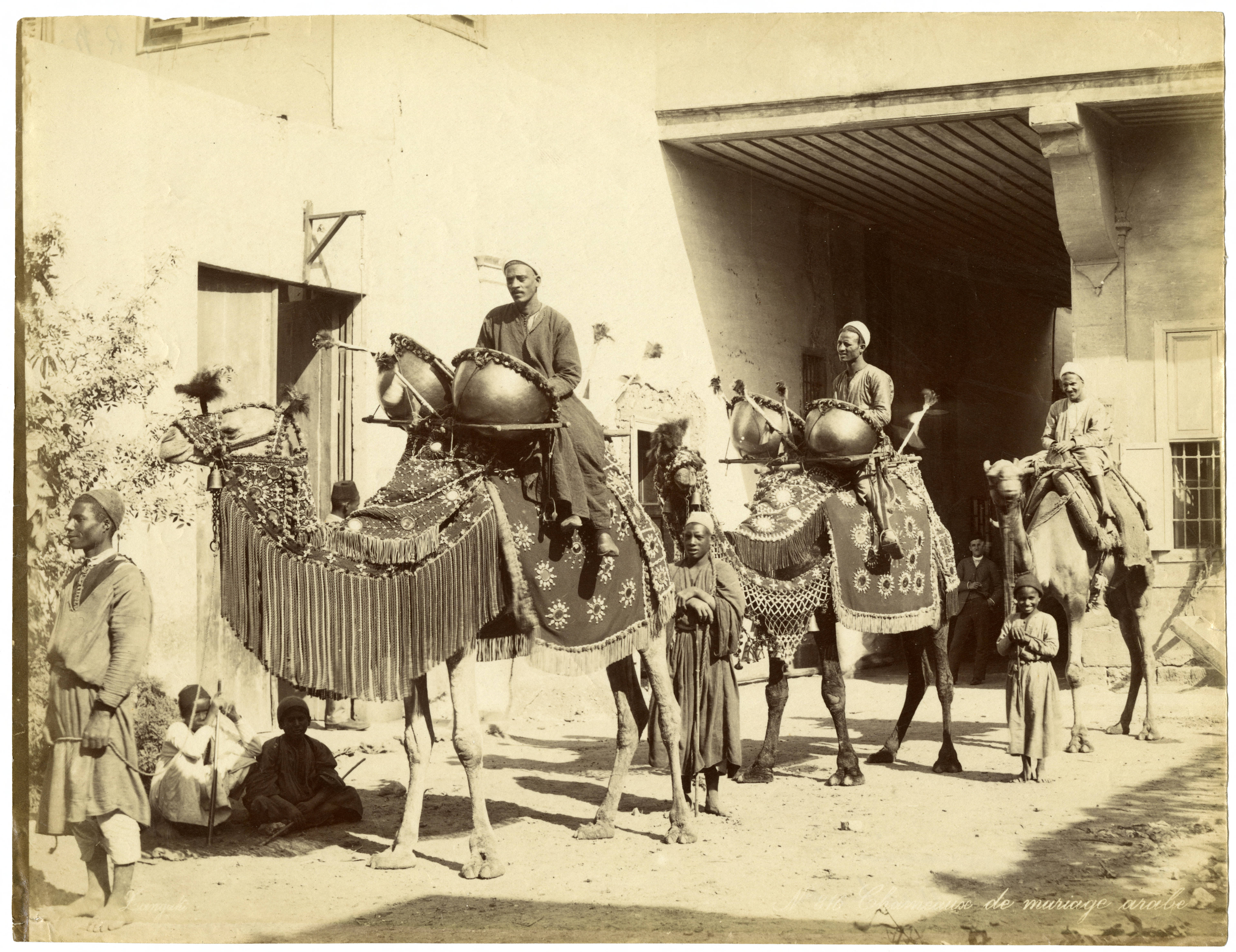
Camel drums in Cairo.

The instrument was a pair of drums, made of clay, wood or metal in the form of a hemispherical kettle, with skin stretched over the mouth. Kus was played with drumsticks of leather or wood (The leather drumstick was called Daval). Kus usually was carried on horseback, camelback or elephant during war to encourage the army. The instrument was also played on many occasions such as festivals and weddings.

In ancient times, kus was accompaniment by karnay (Persian trumpet or horn). Particularly the Persian epic poets Ferdowsi and Nizami in describing battles mentioned kus and karnay in a number of entries. Many Persian miniatures paintings show the presence and importance of the Kus and Karnay in the war fields.

According to the Greek historians, the drum was used by the Persians; Plutarch tells of Iranian warriors at the time of the Arsacid dynasty using kus as warlike instruments.

Apparently after the introduction of Islam, the word Naghghāreh was used for small kettledrums. It seems that the word Naghghareh comes from the Arabic verb Naghr- that means to strike and to beat. A few poets mentioned the name Naghghareh, such as the great Persian mystic poet Molana Jalal al-Din Rumi.

- Kus-e-Ashkebus: Kus attributed to Ashkebus, famous commander of King Afrasiyab mentioned in masterpiece Shahnameh of the famous poet of Persia, Ferdosi.
- Kus-e-dolat: Kettledrum to be played during the victories.
- Kus-e-id: Kettledrum to be played during id (festival).
- Kus-e-Iskandar: Kus attributed to Iskandar.
- Kus-e-jang: Kettledrum used in wars in order to embolden and encourage the soldiers.
- Kus-e-khaghani: Kettledrum for Khaghan (title of Mongol emperors).
- Kus-e-Mahmudi: Kettledrum attributed to King Mahmud Ghaznavi.
- Kus-e-rehlat: Kettledrum to be played during the decamping.
- Kus-e-ruyin: Kettledrum with brazen body.
- Kust: Another name of Kus mentioned in Shahnameh of Ferdosi.

== See also ==
- Naqara
- Nagara (Drum)
- Naker
