= Nagara (drum) =

Musical instrument

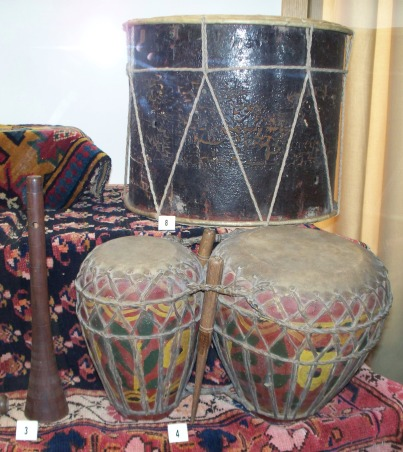
- Ghosha Nagara (top) with zurna and Qoltuq nagara
- Other names: Naghara
- Classification: Percussion instrument

Playing range
- Rope tensioned

The nagara or naghara is a drum used in India. There are several types of naghara, which is considered to be the lead instrument in mandir ceremonies and weddings. These are typically two drums, one treble and one bass and are played with sticks.

In Sikh traditions, the nagara is used as a large singular ceremonial drum in Gatka performances and was used historically in battle.

In Central Asia and the Middle East, the naghara is considered to be only one drum and differs in size and goes by various names such as "boyuk nagara" (big naghara), "cura nagara" (small naghara), "chiling naghara" (played with drum sticks), "Qoltuq nagara" (drum held under the arm), gosha naghara (Naqareh) and "el naghara" (hand naghara).

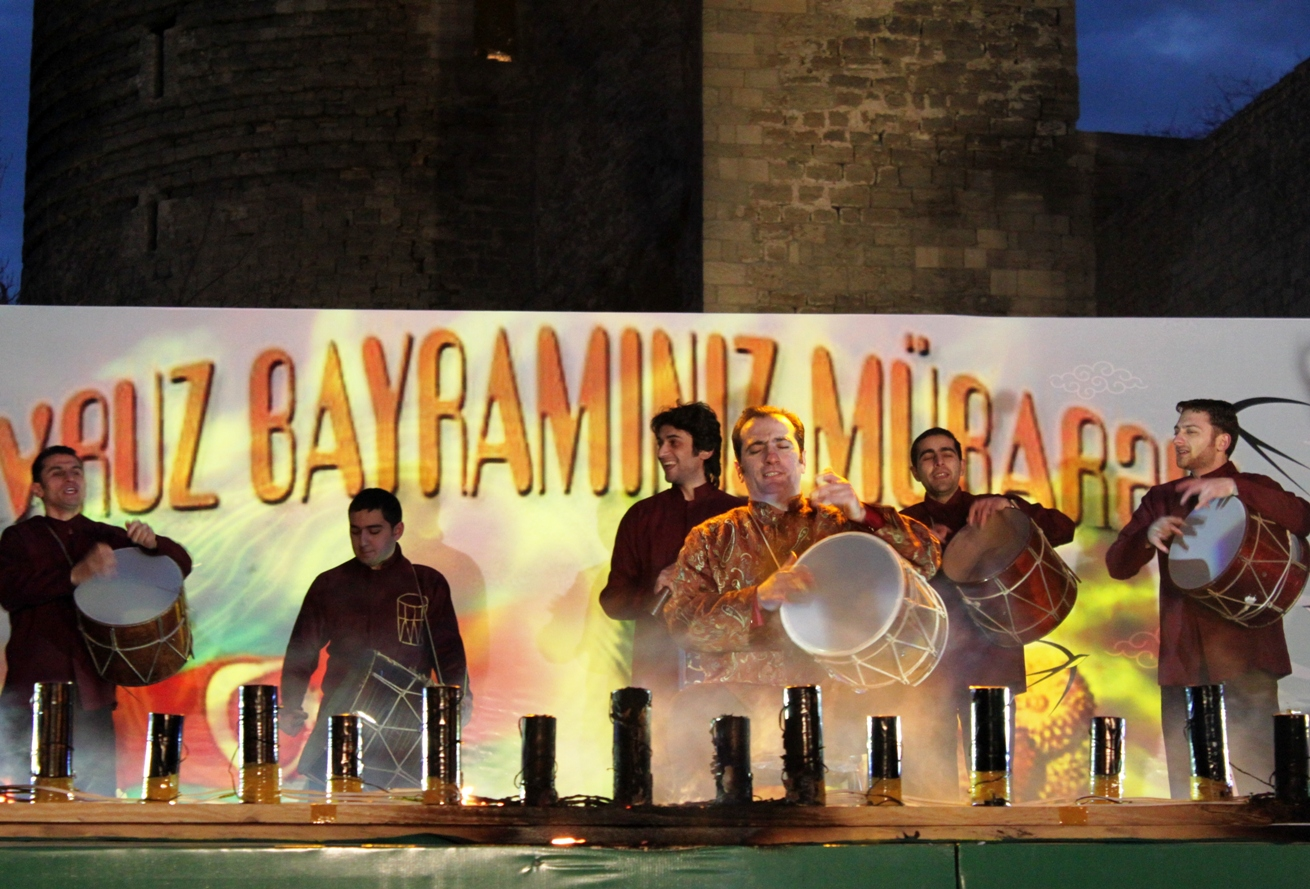
Qoltuq nagara in Azerbaijan

'Nagada' (Indian Drum) is a percussion instrument used for its rhythmic sounds.. Nakara is a festival instrument mostly used in South Indian Hindu temples. The size may vary and this instrument may be kept near the entrance of the South Indian Hindu temples.

== Temple musical instrument ==
Nagada is played even now in chosen Hindu temples in Tamil Nadu. The temple musical instruments are termed as Kethu or jalliry or jalli instruments (Tamil Language: கெத்து வாத்தியம், "ஜல்லிரி', "ஜல்லி'). Mostly the temple staff operate this musical instrument. It is learned that about 18 musical instruments (Ashta dasa) were being played during regular pooja times, special occasions like consecration, temple fairs and festivals and during procession timings i.e., car procession, float festival and palanquin festival processions. These instruments were most popular during eighteenth and nineteenth centuries. Nakara (Indian drum) is one among them. It is the variant of Murasu instrument. In famous temples this pair of musical instrument is either tied on the back of a bull or an elephant and the animal taken before the procession. Beating the instrument would communicate people that the temple procession is following.

== Components of nakara ==
Nakara (pair of Indian drums) is the skin-covered hand drum used in south Indian temple rituals and ceremonies. The bottom portion of Nakara is made with half spherical metal vessel. Most probably the metallic component employed for Nakara would be either brass or copper metal. The instrument may use either goatskin or similar skin for the membrane. The membrane would be attached with the metal vessel either with cords or metal strips. The instrument will raise thunder-like sound when played by beating with the help of special beaters or bent sticks. The purpose of playing Nakara is to communicate with the public by beating the rhythmic sound.

== See also ==
- Naqareh
- Kudum
- Dhol
- Tassa
