= Miskal =

Type of panpipe

- Other names: Skal, Musikar
- Classification: Aerophone

Related instruments
- Pan pipes

A miskal is a type of panpipe found in Iran, Turkey, and Azerbaijan.
