= Cura nagara =

Unpitched percussion instrument

- Other names: Cura nağara, qoşa nağara
- Classification: Percussion instrument

Playing range
- Rope tensioned

The Cura nagara (small nagara) is a folk drum used in the traditional music of Azerbaijan. Since it is smaller than the main nagara, it is called "cura" nagara. The diameter of its body is 300–320 mm, and its height is 340–360 mm.
