= Elazığ dik halay =

External videos
- Elazığ Dik Halayı Arif Sağ
- Shoror Muradian Ensemble
- Barış Manço - İşte Hendek İşte Deve
- Assyrian Loudmila Khoshaba Kochari
- Keti Garbi - Agkires

Elazığ dik halay (Karaçor)(Karachor) is a Turkish kochari folk dance. It is a form of circle dance. There are related folk songs, known as Shoror . There are modern popular versions of this song, with Turkish lyrics, known as İşte Hendek İşte Deve in Turkey. One of these is sung by Barış Manço. There are modern popular versions of this song, with Assyrian lyrics, known as Kochari in Russia, one sung by Loudmila Khoshaba. Kochari is a song from her Album of the year 2008, called "Nazdarta". There are modern popular versions of this song, with Greek lyrics, known as Agkires (Άγκυρες; Anchors) in Greece, one sung by Katy Garbi. Agkires is a song from her Album of the year 1999, called "Doro Theou". This album was composed in Greek by Savvas Angin. The Greek lyrics were written by Eleni Gianatsoulia.
