= Qoltuq nagara =

Musical percussion instrument

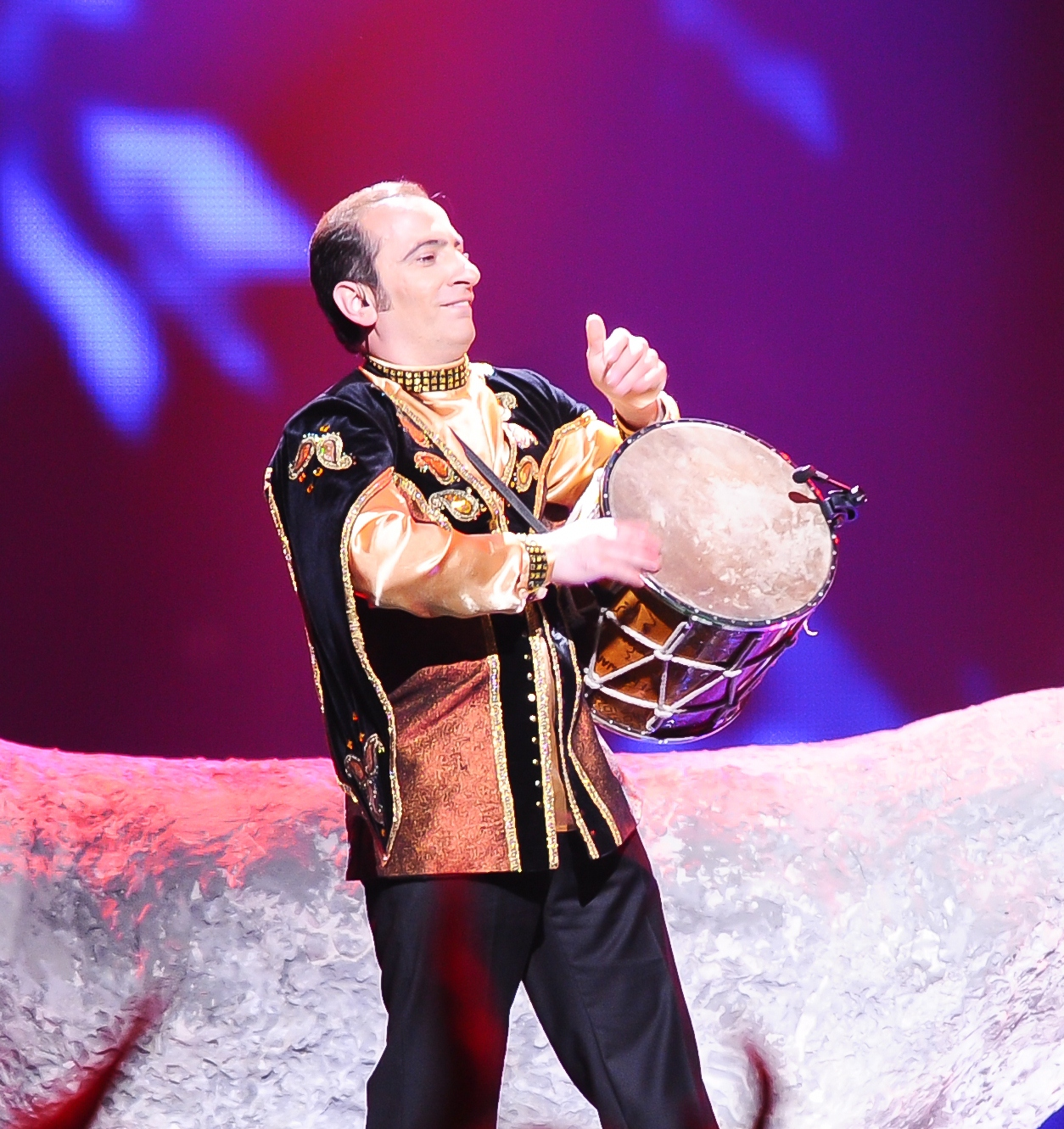
- Other names: Koltuk davulu
- Classification: Percussion instrument (membranophone)

The Qoltuq nagara of Azerbaijan (Armpit drum) Azerbaijani: Qoltuq nağara) , is a folk drum with double head that is played on one side with the bare hands. It is used by Azerbaijanis across the Caucausus and in Iran. This membranophone is different from the dhol and nagara of India.

== Nagara in Turkey ==
The nağara (also called koltuk davulu) is a Turkish folk drum or percussion instrument. It is placed under the arm and beaten with the hands. It is longer compared to the regular drums and its diameter is smaller.

== Nagara in Azerbaijan ==
The naghara (Azerbaijani: nağara) is one of the most popular percussion instruments in Azerbaijan, playing a central role in traditional folk music, weddings, and ensembles alongside the Azerbaijani tar and Kamancheh.

Connected to more ancient instruments of Azerbaijan, especially the fact it is used in the dance Yalli, the qoltuq nağara (armpit drum) is one of many Azerbaijani instruments, which is played using the bare hands, similar to the Caucasian dhol.

The instrument is deeply embedded in Azerbaijani culture and everyday expressions. A well-known local proverb, "Toydan sonra nağara".

This instrument helped the doctors to deal with bad mood, melancholy, intellectual and physical exhaustion, as well as low blood pressure. It was considered that the Naghara could be substituted for some medicinal plants like spicy cloves. The rhythmic beating of the naghara is believed to lead to the strengthening of the heart. The naghara is described in the Early Middle Age Turkish literary epic, "Kitabi Dada Gorgud" (Book of Dede Korkut) (The Book of my Grandfather). Instruments resembling the Naghara were also well known in ancient Egypt.

== Gallery ==
Qoltuq nagara in Azerbaijan

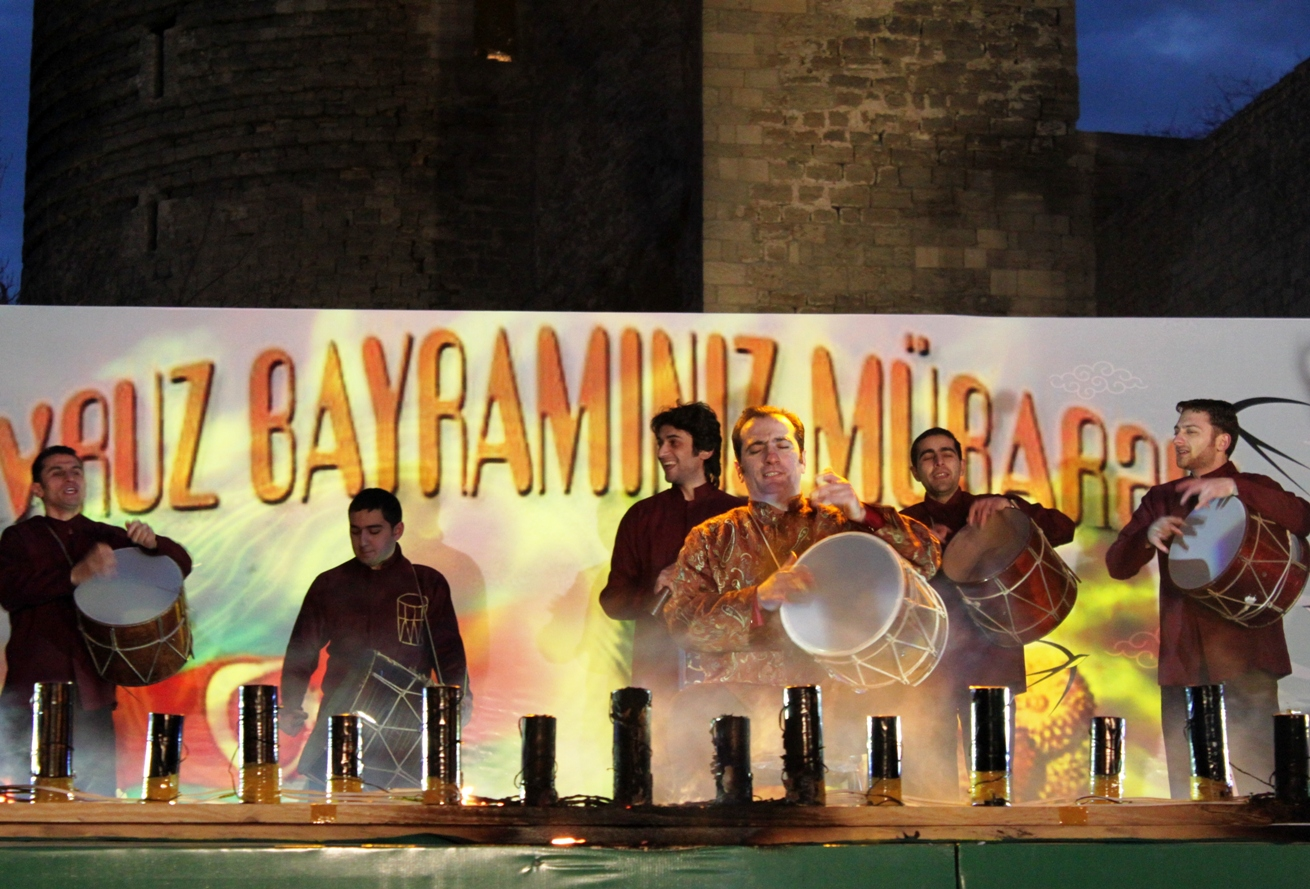

== See also ==
- Naqara
- Naqareh
- Kudum
- Dhol
