= Naqareh =

Middle Eastern drum with a rounded back and a hide head

Naqqāra
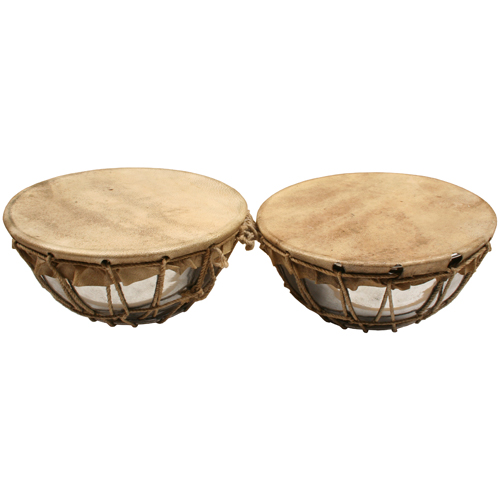
- Iraqi Naqqarat
- Other names: Naqqārat, naqqare, nakkare, nagora, نقاره
- Classification: Percussion instrument

More articles or information
- Kus; Timpani

The naqareh, naqqāra, nagara or nagada is a Middle Eastern drum with a rounded back and a hide head, usually played in pairs. It is thus a membranophone of the kettle drum variety.

The term naqqāra (نقاره), also نقارات naqqarat, naqqarah, naqqåre, nakkare, nagora comes from the Urdu verb naqr- that means "to strike, beat".

The instrument was also adopted in Europe following the Crusades, and known as the naccaire or naker.

== Construction ==
The rounded section of a naqqara is made of baked clay, while the flat side consists of treated skin fastened around the rim with string which is tightened over the back of the bowl.

== Playing ==
This percussion instrument is often played in pairs, where one naqqara will produce low pitch beats called nar and the other for the high pitch beats. The instruments are beaten with short wooden sticks bent outward at the upper ends called damka.

== Varieties ==
=== Iraq and the other Arab countries ===
Naqqārāt is the name of kettledrums in Arabic countries. Naqqārāt, hemispherical with the skin stretched over the top, come in pairs. Naqqarat is one of the percussion instruments used in Maqam al-Iraqi chalghi ensembles. Under the late Abbasids and the Fatimid Caliphate, kettledrums were beaten before the five daily prayers; small ones form part of present-day orchestral ensembles.

=== Iran ===
Naqqåre can be found in different sizes in different regions of Iran:

- Naqåre-ye Shomal "northern naqqåre": played in northern Iran. Its native name in Mazandaran Province is desarkutan. Desarkutan is in fact a pair of small drums whose bodies are made of clay. Their structure is like that of a bowl. One is larger than the other; the larger is called bam and the smaller one is called zil. which respectively mean "bass" and "treble". The diameter of the bam is about 22 cm and the diameter of the zil is about 16 cm. Two drums are covered by cowhide, though in the past boarhide was used. The skin is tightened on the drums by bands made of cow tendon.
- Desarkutan: played with two wooden drumsticks. The length of the drumsticks is 25–27 cm. The thicker drumstick is used to play on the larger drum. The diameter of the drumsticks is 1-1.5 cm. Serna, the Mazandarani oboe, (Dari Persian sorna) is accompanied by one or two sets of desarkutan. These instruments are played in festive ceremonies such as wedding ceremonies, sport ceremonies and so on. Desarkutan is not used as a solo instrument.
- Fars naqqåre: played in the Fars province of Iran is a little larger than ordinary naqqåre.
- Sanandaji naqqåre: played in the Sanandaj city of Kurdistan province of Iran is a little larger than ordinary naqqåre.
- Naqqårekhån: Khåne literally means "house, home, room, place" and in Iran, there were different kinds of naqqårekhåne and there were places for announcing important news by playing on the kettledrums such as rising and setting of the sun, victory, mourning, birth of a male baby etc. These were also called Kuskhåne or, in Indian languages, naubat-khāna.

=== Indian subcontinent ===
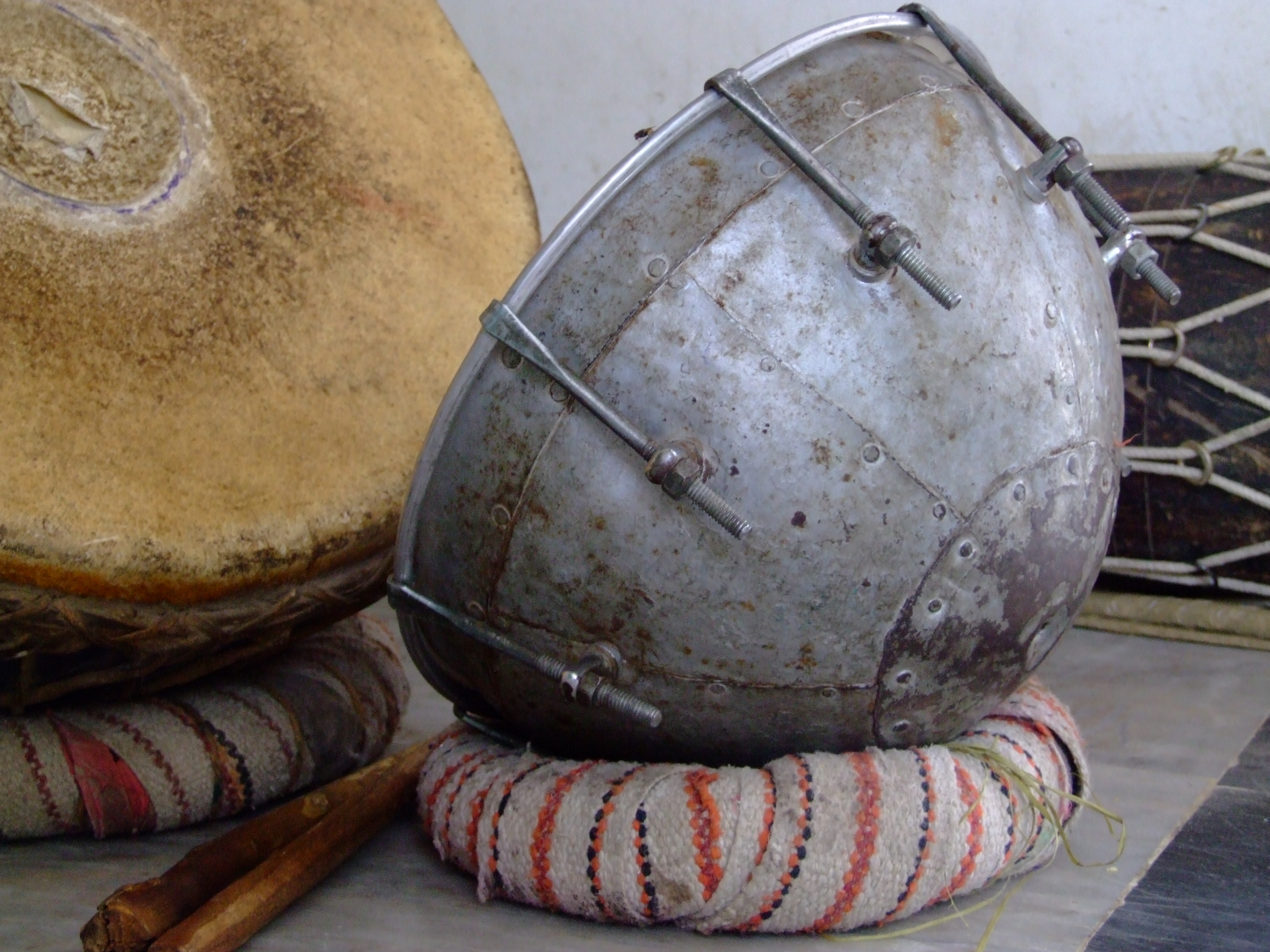
Dukar-Tikar, from Nagara genre, are kettledrums which accompany shehnai, an Indian woodwind instrument. Rajasthan.

Naqqara are also found in India, where the word is pronounced nagara or nagada. They are paired kettledrums traditionally used in the naubat "Nine Things", a traditional ensemble of nine instruments. Nagara are also played with sticks. Today, this instrument is usually used to accompany the shehnai or "Indian oboe", an indispensable component of any North Indian wedding.

It was also used during Guru Gobind Singh Ji’s time as a war drum (first mentioned in the Battle of Banghani). This was to infuse pride into the Sikh armies while charging. It can be seen now usually at a Sikh martial art display (Gatka display) playing in the background.

Rebecca Stewart's unpublished thesis, The Tabla in Perspective (UCLA, 1974) has suggested tabla was most likely a hybrid resulting from experiments with existing drums such as pakhawaj, dholak, and naqqara.

=== Azerbaijan ===
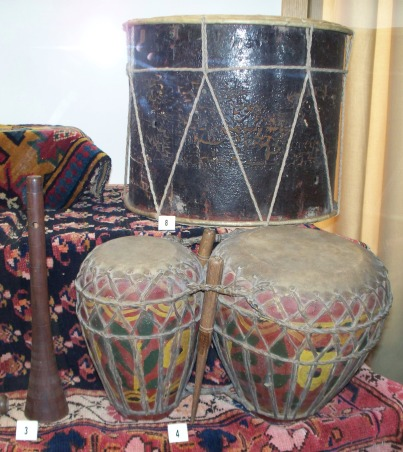
Ghosha Naqara with zurna and naqareh

In Azerbaijan there is a kind of kettledrum that is called goshanaghara (Azerbaijani: qoşanağara). Gosha (Azerbaijani: qoşa) means "pair".

=== Turkey ===
In Turkey, this word is pronounced nakkare and refers to small kettledrums beaten with the hands or two sticks. Kös, or giant kettledrums played on horseback, are a separate instrument. These drums and the davul or cylindrical drum were used in Ottoman mehter music.

=== Uzbekistan ===
In Uzbekistan the kettledrum is called naqara or nagora. Dulnaqara: a large kettledrum that gives a low and loud sound (i.e. "tum"). Reznaqara is a small kettledrum that gives a high and loud sound (i.e. "tak"). Koshnaqara is a small-paired kettledrum, a pair of clay pots with goatskin tops.

=== Europe ===
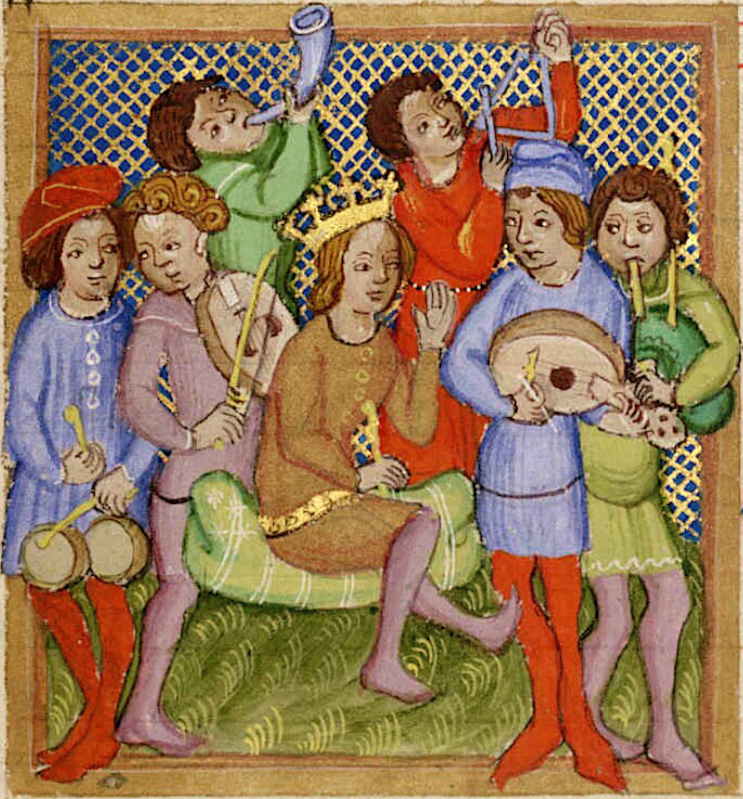
1417 A.D. German miniature, with nakers being played, far left.

Kettledrums were adopted in Europe during the 13th century Crusades, following contact with Saracen musicians who played the drums. The Arabic term naqqara became French nacaires, the Italian naccheroni and the English nakers. The instrument spread rapidly, reaching England in the 14th century; the nacaire was, according to Froissart and the Chronicles of Jean de Joinville, among the instruments used at the entry of Edward III into Calais in 1347. The instrument is very visible in European artwork and iconography of the period, before fading from view in the 17th century.

As the Grove Dictionary of Music describes them:

They were more or less hemispherical, 15-25cm in diameter, frequently with snares and usually played in pairs, suspended in front of the player. They were usually played with drumsticks, mainly for martial purposes but also in chamber music, dance and processional music and probably for accompanying songs.

Kettledrums in Europe today are called tympani or timpani, descended from the imported naqareh.

=== Georgia ===
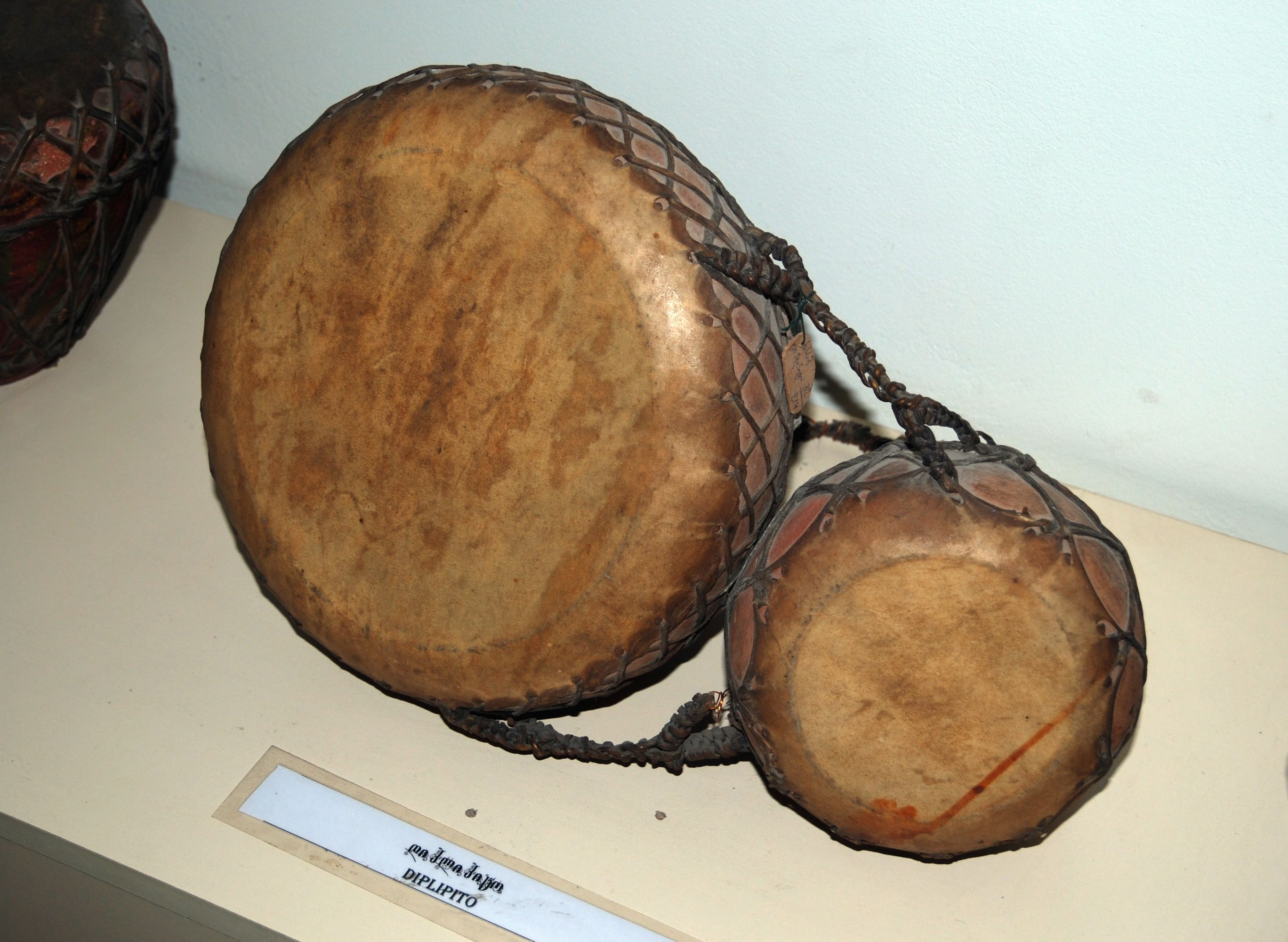
Diplipito

Diplipito is a widespread percussion instrument all over Georgia. It comprises two small cone-shaped clay pots (jars) of the same height, but different width, which are covered with leather. One of the clay pots is smaller than the other. A cord ties the two jars together. The height of the jars is 200–250 mm, and their diameters are 90mm and 170mm. The diplipito is played with two small sticks called "goat legs." The instrument is used to provide rhythms for vocal music and dance music. It is often combined with instruments such as duduki, buzika panduri, and salamuri. The diplipito is generally played by males, and plays an important role in Georgian folk ensembles.

== See also ==
- Nagara (drum)
- Dhol
- Diplipito
- Kudum
- Tassa
