= Kudüm =

Musical instrument

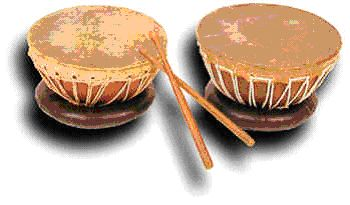
Kudüm

Kudüm is one of the most fundamental rhythm instruments in classical Turkish music. The person playing it is called kudümzen. It is grouped with the ney, rebap, and halile as one of the four main instruments in Mevlevi music. It consists of a pair of small, hemispherical drums. Traditionally kudüm was played in religious ceremonies; in a secular context, like in mehter music, its slightly bigger cousin nakkare is played.

The drums are some 28–30 cm. in diameter and about 16 cm high, growing narrower toward the bottom like a half-sphere. They are made of beaten copper, and resemble two bowls, one larger than the other. The difference in the thickness of the skin in the two bowls create a difference in pitch: the high-pitched drum (tek) is placed on the left, the other (düm) on the right. The tek, with its thinner skin, is slightly smaller than the düm. The tension in the skin can be adjusted to tune the instrument according to the makam of the music being played. Camel's skin is usually preferred, although sometimes cattle or llama is also used. The drums are placed on two leather links filled with cotton to prevent them from slipping and to avoid direct contact with the floor to get the right sound. The kudüm is played with two wooden sticks made of soft wood known as zahme. The metal body of the kudüm is generally covered with leather to prevent it giving off a tinny sound.

Historically, the kudüm was played and developed by the Mevlevis in religious ceremonies. In fact, it was not until the 20th century that the instrument was used in mainstream Turkish classical music. It was used in a nonreligious setting for the first time in 1947 in a concert organized by the Üsküdar Musical Association. In 1957, the first radio performance was performed by Kudümzen Hurşit Ungay. Cafer Açın was an instrument maker who made important changes in the making of the instrument in the latter half of the 20th century. Sadettin Heper is also an important composer whose music involved the instrument.

== See also ==
- Naqareh
- Nagara
- Doumbek
- Bendir
- Daf
