= Pseudolus =

Ancient Roman play by Plautus

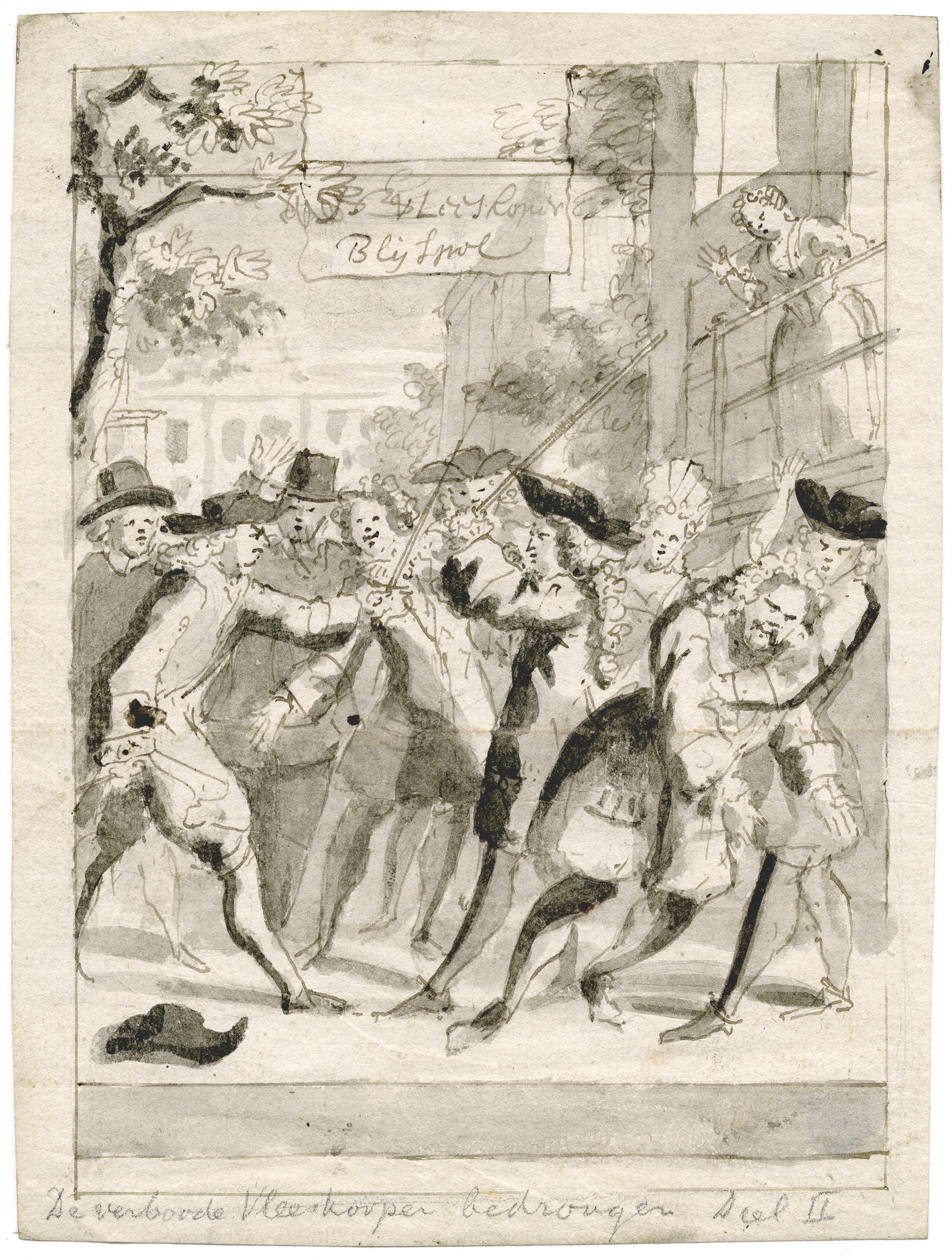
- Design for a frontispiece by Hendrik van Halmael
- Original language: Latin
- Written by: Plautus
- Characters: Simo, Athenian gentleman; Calidorus, son of Simo; Pseudolus, slave to Simo; Callipho, neighbor of Simo; Phoenicium, prostitute; Ballio, pimp; Harpax, slave of an officer; Slave boy belonging to Ballio; A cook, hired by Ballio; Charinus, friend of Calidorus; Simia, slave to Charinus
- Genre: Roman comedy
- Setting: a street in Athens, before the houses of Simo, Callipho, and Ballio

Premiere
- Date: 191 BC
- Place: Rome

Pseudolus is a play by the ancient Roman playwright Titus Maccius Plautus. It is one of the earliest examples of Roman literature and is a key example of the Fabulae Palliatae which are early Roman Comedies set in a Classical Greek setting. Pseudolus was first shown in 191 BC during the Megalesian Festival, which was a celebration for the Phrygian goddess Cybele. The temple for worship of Cybele in Rome was completed during the same year in time for the festival.

Pseudolus was written in Plautus's old age (he was probably over 60 at the time): Cicero mentions it in his book on Old Age as an example of a work written by older men. It proved to be very popular and was frequently revived. Cicero records that in his day the famous actor Roscius frequently took the part of Ballio.

Malcolm M. Willcock calls this play "Plautus' masterpiece". He adds: "For the special qualities of Plautus – vigour, wit, invention, the charm of low-class humanity – this play is supreme."

== Characters ==
- Simo – an Athenian gentleman
- Calidorus - Simo's son
- Pseudolus - Simo's chief slave
- Callipho - a neighbor and friend of Simo
- Charinus - a friend of Calidorus
- Ballio - a pimp
- Phoenicium - (mute) a girl in the possession of Ballio and loved by Calidorus
- Harpax - a soldier's slave
- Slave boy belonging to Ballio
- A cook hired by Ballio
- Simia - a cunning slave belonging to Charinus

== Plot synopsis ==
The play starts with a two-line prologue (incomplete and probably not by Plautus), which is a warning to the audience that the play is long and now is the time to stretch their legs because they are about to be sitting for a long time.

Act 1 Once the play starts Calidorus and Pseudolus enter the stage, Calidorus is visibly upset. After Pseudolus pushes his master's son to tell him what is wrong, Calidorus shows him a letter he received. Pseudolus first mocks the poor handwriting it is written in then reads the letter, which says that Calidorus' lover Phoenicium, a prostitute, has been sold and the man who is supposed to come with the last of the money to pay for her and pick her up for her new master is coming very soon. Calidorus obviously wants to save her but he has no money of his own and his father won't lend him any to help save her. He turns to Pseudolus, who is his father's chief slave, for help. Pseudolus doesn't have the money they require to buy her, but thinks he can improvise a plan to get it and to save Phoenicium. At this time, Calidorus tells Pseudolus to be quiet, saying he hears the pimp Ballio, Phoenicium's master, leaving his house. Ballio enters the stage addressing his slaves, telling them that they aren't worth their keep and that they don't know how to behave. He claims beating them hurts him more than it hurts them and that they will steal anything if given the chance.

Ballio begins organizing his slaves and making preparations for his own birthday celebration, and says he will be off to the market to strike a deal with the fishmonger. After he organizes his slaves and assigns them all specific tasks for the day, he calls his four courtesans out of the house. He orders them to make themselves the most desirable companions for the day, and to earn him supplies based on their status with men in different markets—specifically, grain, meat, oil, and farm produce. Ballio threatens to whip them and send them to work in a brothel if his demands are not met.

Calidorus and Pseudolus have been watching Ballio throughout this entire speech from a hidden corner, making comments about his corruption and tyranny, and generally loathing his entire existence. Calidorus is deeply concerned about the future of Phoenicium and asks Pseudolus what he should do in order to keep Ballio from putting her on the streets. Pseudolus tells Calidorus not to worry about it, and that he will take care of it by delivering Ballio "a nice fat packet of trouble." This uncertain prospect is torturous to Calidorus, who claims that it's only natural that a lover must behave like a fool.

Ballio departs from his house to go to the market, with one of his slaves leading. Pseudolus calls out to him from their hiding place, and asks him to come and talk. Ballio is dismissive of Pseudolus, and tries to avoid him several times. Pseudolus finally successfully intercepts him, but Ballio still refuses to truly listen. He hints that there must be a promise of money in order for him to open his ears to Pseudolus and Calidorus' pleas.

Having appealed to his business side to pull him into conversation, Pseudolus and Calidorus try to play nice, apologizing for the fact that Calidorus does not have the money to buy his love's freedom. Ballio insists that Calidorus could have found a way to get the money and says that he must care more for duty than for love. Pseudolus begs him to give them more time to find the money when Ballio informs them that Phoenicium has already been sold for 20 minae (2000 drachmae) to the Macedonian officer, Polymachaeroplagides. Pseudolus and Calidorus then call Ballio all the dirty names and curses they can think of. Untouched by their words, Ballio says that if Calidorus can bring him the money before the officer pays the final amount owed, 5 minae, the deal with the officer will be off and Calidorus can take his love. Ballio then goes to town for his birthday preparations and Pseudolus beseeches Calidorus to find a sharp-witted friend to assist in taking Phoenicium from Ballio.

Uncertain as to how to get the girl, Pseudolus hatches a plan to obtain the 20 minae by stealing it from Simo, the father of Calidorus. Pseudolus sees Simo coming with his neighbor Callipho, and hides and listens to their conversation. The two are discussing Simo's son, Calidorus, and the rumor that he wants to buy his true love's freedom. Simo doesn't think that it is proper for his son to be in love with a prostitute and doesn't want to believe the rumor. Callipho is trying to convince Simo to at least listen to his son to see if what they are hearing is true and to take pity on him because he is a man in love just as Simo was when he was young. Pseudolus decides to appear and greets them.

Simo asks Pseudolus about getting the money out of him by performing a "crafty and underhand trick." Pseudolus admits to wanting to get the money from him. Simo refuses to give Pseudolus the 20 minae. Pseudolus retorts, "You'll give it to me. I'm only telling you, so that you can be on your guard." Pseudolus also promises that he will wage war on Ballio and get the girl from him on that very day. He asks Simo to give him money so that he can give it to Ballio should he succeed in winning the girl from the pimp. At long last Simo agrees to the bet: the flour mill for Pseudolous if he fails to get the girl by day's end and 20 minae from Simo if he succeeds. Callipho promises Pseudolus that if he gets the girl and if Simo does not give him the money, he will himself because he does not want to see his plan fail. While Pseudolus goes away to think up a plan, there is a musical interlude.

Act 2 Pseudolus sees a stranger approaching and figures that this is his chance. Realising that this is the messenger sent by the Macedonian soldier to pay the balance for Phoenicium, Pseudolus tricks Harpax into thinking he is Surus (Syrus), a slave of Ballio, and tries to get the 5 minae from Harpax by telling him that his master Ballio is working on a court case and can't meet with him at this time. Pseudolus says he can receive the money on his behalf. Harpax refuses to give the money up to anyone but Ballio. Harpax says he will leave with the money and come back at a different time. He leaves Pseudolus with a sealed letter from his master, the Macedonian general. Harpax tells Pseudolus he is staying in town in a certain tavern and asks Pseudolus to send for him when Ballio is ready to meet. Harpax leaves and Calidorus arrives with his friend Charinus.

Right away Pseudolus and Charinus begin talking. Pseudolus is describing how he has pulled the wool over the Macedonian soldier's eyes, and boasts that the girl Calidorus loves will be in his arms today. The only problem is that Pseudolus requires a few things: a clever young man, a soldier's cloak, sword, and hat, and 5 minae. Charinus offers him the 500. Charinus and Calidorus say they know of just the clever slave who can help them. They then depart to go and collect the things that Pseudolus requires.

Act 3 As they depart a slave boy creeps out of Ballio's house and speaks to the audience. He says that he needs to find money to give Ballio, his boss, a present before the day is over or he will be tortured. Since he is small and ugly and cannot find a lover, he does not know what to do. Meanwhile, Ballio returns to his house with a cook. The two are arguing about how much the cook charges people for his services. Ballio is quite angry that he has to pay two drachmae instead of one to be able to have a cook for his birthday celebration. The cook is insulted and asks why he hired him. Ballio replies that he had to, because he was the only cook left. The cook immediately starts to make his own case, explaining in great detail why he is the best cook and that he doesn't even stand up for less than two drachmae. Ballio remains unconvinced and waits to see for himself what the cook can really do when the time for dinner comes.

Act 4 Charinus and Calidorus have gotten the clever boy Pseudolus is in need of: Simia, another clever slave. Pseudolus and Simia discuss plans for getting Phoenicium from Ballio. Pseudolus is a bit anxious about Simia succeeding in duping Ballio. Simia is confident to the point of arrogance and is annoyed by Pseudolus' anxieties. Pseudolus takes Simia to meet Ballio and the scene switches between their interaction and Pseudolus' commentary as he watches the events unfold. The plan threatens to come unraveled when Ballio asks Simia the name of his master (which Simia does not know). Simia turns the question around by demanding that Ballio inspect the letter's seal and tell him the name of the sender so that he knows that Ballio is who he claims to be. Ballio consents and gives the name, Polymachaeroplagides. Ballio breaks the seal and reads the letter. Simia hands over the money gotten by Pseudolus from Charinus. Ballio and Simia go inside to retrieve Phoenicium. Pseudolus frets as he waits for them to come out. Eventually they do. As they exit the house, Simia consoles Phoenicium, who thinks she is being led to the Macedonian general, Polymachaeroplagides, by telling her that he is in fact taking her to her boyfriend Calidorus. Pseudolus is triumphant.

Ballio is also triumphant, boasting to Simo that they have won the bet because he has finally and successfully sold Phoenicium to the Macedonian general and placed her safely in the hands of his soldier Harpax. He promises to give Simo 20 minae if he is found to be lying. As the two discuss the matter the real Harpax arrives. The two think that he is an impersonator hired by Pseudolus.

Ballio and Simo ridicule and poke fun at Harpax in the hopes that he will admit that he is an imposter sent by Pseudolus to steal Phoenicium from Ballio. Ballio indecently suggests that the soldier rapes him at night; and he asks how much it cost to hire his cloak and hat. Finally Ballio asks him how much Pseudolus has paid him. Harpax, of course, denies even knowing a Pseudolus and tells Ballio he delivered the letter with the seal to Ballio's servant earlier that day. Simo begins to realize that Pseudolus has been there first and has already tricked Harpax. He asks Harpax what the servant he gave the letter to looked like. As Harpax describes the slave, Ballio and Simo realize that Pseudolus has tricked them. Harpax and Simo then demand the money that is owed to them from Ballio. Ballio heads to the Forum to get the money to pay Harpax back and tells Simo he will pay him tomorrow. Simo admits that he has lost the bet he made with Pseudolus and goes to get the money from his house.

Act 5 Pseudolus celebrates his victory, returning to the home of his master drunk. He is so drunk that he constantly belches in Simo's face. Eventually Simo hands him the money, asking if Pseudolus will cut the debt down any. Pseudolus refuses. Pseudolus then tells Simo to follow him. Simo believes that Pseudolus is attempting to embarrass him and tries to refuse; but Pseudolus insists. Pseudolus then reveals that he plans to go drinking with Simo and has no intent of embarrassing him. The play ends when Simo asks if Pseudolus would like to invite the audience. Pseudolus declines because he believes they wouldn't invite him, but does invite them to applaud.

== Metrical structure ==
Plautus's plays were divided up into 5 acts, probably in Renaissance times. However, it is not thought that these divisions go back to Plautus's time, since no manuscript contains them before the 15th century. Also, the acts themselves do not always match the structure of the plays, which is more clearly shown by the variation in metres.

In Plautus's plays the usual pattern is to begin each section with iambic senarii (which were spoken without music), then a scene of music in various metres, and finally a scene in trochaic septenarii, which were apparently recited to the accompaniment of tibiae (a pair of reed pipes). Moore calls this the "ABC succession", where A = iambic senarii, B = other metres, C = trochaic septenarii. Pseudolus follows this scheme, except for the final canticum, the overall pattern being:

ABC, ABC, ABC, ABC, B

The Pseudolus is unusual in having no fewer than five polymetric cantica or song-passages, taking up a quarter of the play. (Only one play, the Casina, has a greater proportion.) The cantica in the Pseudolus are in a complex medley of metres: anapaestic, cretic, bacchiac, trochaic, iambic, and others, frequently changing from line to line. The analysis of these metres is difficult, and not always agreed on.

In the play as a whole (of 1699 lines), the commonest metres are the iambic senarius (649 lines) and trochaic septenarius (640 lines). Other metres are less commonly used: anapaests 127 lines, cretics 77 lines, bacchiacs 49 lines, trochaic octonarii 31 lines, iambic octonarii 22 lines, other iambic metres 42 lines, other trochaic metres 32 lines.

=== Calidorus's despair ===
- 1.1 (lines 1–132): iambic senarii (130 lines)

Pseudolus asks his young master Calidorus why he is so sad. Calidorus shows him a letter from his mistress Phoenicium, in which she says that she has been sold against her will to a certain soldier. Calidorus, who has no money to buy her freedom, says he wants to hang himself.

- 1.2–1.3 (133–264): polymetric canticum (132 lines)

Ballio, the pimp, brings out his slaves and chides them for their laziness, while whipping them. He orders them to prepare everything for his birthday party. Then he sets off for the market to buy fish and find a cook. Changing his mind, he calls out his four prostitutes, addressing by name: Hedyllium, Aeschrodora, Xystilis, and Phoenicium herself. He gives them orders to go to work, insisting that they persuade their lovers to provide presents (corn, meat, oil, and farm produce respectively). Then he sets off for the market again. Calidorus, who is listening, despairs, but Pseudolus says he has a plan. Pseudolus calls to Ballio and tries to stop him. When Ballio doesn't listen, Calidorus despairs again. Pseudolus at last stops Ballio by mentioning a deal.

- 1.3 (265–393): trochaic septenarii (129 lines)

Pseudolus pleads that Ballio has agreed to sell Phoenicium to Calidorus. Ballio taunts him and says Calidorus's promises are worthless. Then he reveals that in any case he has sold Phoenicium to a Macedonian officer and has already received part of the money. Pseudolus and Calidorus heap him with insults. Ballio eventually agrees to change his mind if Calidorus can bring the money quicker than the soldier. He leaves. Pseudolus tells Calidorus he has a plan and asks him to go and fetch a clever friend.

=== Pseudolus warns Simo and tricks Harpax ===
- 1.4–1.5 (394–573): iambic senarii (182 lines)

In a soliloquy, Pseudolus tells himself how he must find a plan; he had already tried to get the money from Calidorus's father Simo, but Simo had become suspicious and the plan had failed. Simo enters with his friend Callipho, telling him that he knows all about Calidorus's affair. Callipho tries to persuade Simo to be lenient with his son. Pseudolus addresses Simo and, when questioned, feely admits that the story is true. He boldly warns Simo that he will get the 20 minae out of him by the end of the day. He persuades Simo to promise to pay him 20 minae if he manages to get the girl free before then. Callipho promises to guarantee the wager and says he will stay to watch the fun. Simo and Callipho then leave, and Pseudolus confides to the audience that he doesn't actually have a plan as yet. He goes off to think one up, and while the stage is empty, the piper entertains the audience with music.

- 2.1–2.2 (574–603): polymetric canticum (32 lines)

Pseudolus comes back singing jubilantly that he has found a plan. He reminds himself that he must be bold if he is to succeed in defeating Ballio. Suddenly he sees Harpax arriving, sent by the soldier to collect Phoenicium. Pseudolus overhears him talking to himself, and realises that he must change his plan.

- 2.2–2.4 (604–766): trochaic septenarii (163 lines)

Pretending to be Ballio's butler, Surus (Syrus), Pseudolus tries to persuade Harpax to hand over the money. He fails in this but Harpax rather naively hands him the letter which the soldier had sent to Ballio. When Harpax has gone to rest in an inn, Pseudolus congratulates himself on his good fortune. Calidorus now enters with his friend Charinus. Pseudolus exuberantly greets his master in a mock-tragic style. He asks Charinus if he can find him a clever slave to help him with his trick. Charinus says he knows just the one; and he also promises to lend Pseudolus 5 minae which he needs for his trick.

=== Simia disguised as Harpax ===
- 3.1–3.2 (767–904): iambic senarii (137 lines)

A young slave boy comes out of Ballio's house. He bewails the fact that he will be punished if he does not bring money for his master's birthday, but that he is too young and too ugly to get a lover.

– Now Ballio returns from the market bringing a cook. He grumbles at the price charged by the cook; but the cook boasts that his cooking is exceptionally good. Ballio warns the boy to keep a sharp watch on the cook and his assistants to make sure they don't steal anything from the house. He then reveals that his neighbour Simo has warned him that he must be on his guard against Pseudolus, who is planning to abduct Phoenicium.

- 4.1 (905–950): polymetric canticum (58 lines)

Pseudolus enters saying that Simia (the slave he has dressed up as Harpax) is as much as a rascal as he is himself. But suddenly he is alarmed when he realises that Simia is not with him – he has dawdled behind. Simia catches him up and reassures him that he will play the part well.

- 4.1–4.2 (951–997): trochaic septenarii (45 lines)

Simia asks Pseudolus to point out Ballio's house. Ballio comes out, and Simia accosts him rudely. He hands over the letter. He is almost caught out when he realises he doesn't know the soldier's name, but tricks Ballio into revealing it.

=== Ballio is defeated ===
- 4.2–4.6 (998–1102): iambic senarii (102 lines)

Ballio reads the soldier's letter aloud. Satisfied, he takes Simia inside the house. Left behind, Pseudolus is frantic with anxiety in case something goes wrong. He is afraid Simia may trick him, or that his master Simo or the real Harpax may arrive at any moment. At last Simia comes out with Phoenicium, telling her not to weep. They go off with Pseudolus to find Calidorus. Ballio comes out laughing triumphantly at having got the better of Pseudolus. Simo arrives and Ballio congratulates him that Pseudolus hasn't won. He even pledges to give Simo 20 minae if he is found to be lying.

- 4.7 (1103–1134): polymetric canticum (34 lines)

The real Harpax enters, complaining that Ballio's slave Surus never came to fetch him from the inn where he is staying. Ballio tells Simo that he is sure the stranger is a potential customer.

- 4.7–4.8 (1135–1245): trochaic septenarii (109 lines)

Harpax knocks on Ballio's door and says he is looking for Ballio. He informs Ballio that he has come for Phoenicium and hands over 5 minae. At first Ballio and Simo are convinced he is an imposter sent by Pseudolus. They question him rudely, making indecent insinuations, to which Harpax protests angrily. They accuse him of having been coached by Pseudolus. But gradually it dawns on them that they have been tricked, especially when Harpax describes the slave "Surus" to whom he gave the letter as "A certain red-haired fellow, pot-bellied, with thick calves, swarthy, with a big head, sharp eyes, red face, and very large feet", clearly a description of Pseudolus. Simo and Harpax both insist that Ballio pays them the money that he owes them. Ballio in defeat goes off to the forum with Harpax to raise the cash. Simo, remaining alone, also admits defeat and resolves to pay Pseudolus the 20 minae he promised.

=== Pseudolus celebrates ===
- 5.1–5.2 (1246–1335): polymetric canticum (90 lines)

Pseudolus enters drunk and singing; he has been enjoying a wild party with Calidorus and a girlfriend. He knocks on Simo's door. Simo comes to the door with the promised money, while Pseudolus belches rudely in his master's face. Simo hands over the money and asks if Pseudolus will share it with him, but he refuses. Finally Pseudolus invites Simo to the party, promising him half the money if he agrees to come. The two go off together.

== Themes ==
The clever slave: Pseudolus and Simia are both slaves in this play and are both the smartest characters. Pseudolus comes up with a plan to get Phoenicium for Calidorus, and Simia helps carry out the plan. Pseudolus's plan is successful, and as a result of wagers made along the way, he gains 2,000 drachmae in the process. Pseudolus's machinations show that wisdom and ability are blind to strictures of class. The theme of the clever slave is one that transcends time and place because even though slaves are the lowest on the class system they still are intelligent and successful. The theme of the clever slave is essentially an underdog story. The clever slave character is one whose origins lie in stories told among members of the slave class; Plautus has here adopted this stock character for his own story.

The contemptible pimp: As in many other comedies of both Plautus and Terence, the leno (trafficker in courtesans) is a character universally held in contempt. This is evident not only from Ballio's behaviour towards his slaves but also from the insults which Pseudolus and Calidorus pile on his head ("shameless! criminal! deserving a whipping! tomb-robber! sacrilegious! perjurer!" and so on), Simia's insulting description ("I am looking for a man who is law-breaking, impure, a perjurer, and impious"), and the insulting addition to the soldier's letter ("if I thought you deserving of greetings, I would send them").

Class does not equal intelligence: With the stock character, the clever slave (played by Pseudolus), the audience gets a glimpse that, despite the assumptions that Pseudolus, a slave, cannot possibly outwit the upperclass citizens, Ballio and Simo, this indeed does occur. Pseudolus is able to prove just how clever he is by fooling multiple others in order to help his owner's son, Calidorus. This play, a part of Roman popular culture, would have wide appeal in a society where there was much discrepancy of wealth. Those of the less wealthy would be happy to see Pseudolus the slave outwit his monied owners.

True love crossing boundaries: True love has the ability to cross boundaries, meaning that money, poverty, and class cannot restrict the feelings one person has for another. Throughout this play, Pseudolus does everything he can to rescue his master's son's true love, the prostitute Phoenicium, so that they can be together. Calidorus is of the upper classes, while Phoenicium is a slave and prostitute and is owned by the pimp Ballio. At play's end the two are united, showing that true love indeed can cross all boundaries. (Plautus, The Pot of Gold and Other Plays, Pseudolus)

Objectification of Women: Objectification of women in Pseudolus is represented mainly through the pimp Ballio's treatment of his slave and prostitute, Phoenicium. Ballio sells her, though he has promised to sell her to her true love, like an object of property, to the Macedonian soldier, Polymachaeroplagides, in exchange for 2000 drachmae. His treatment of her and of his other slave prostitutes whom he threatens to whip and send to a brothel if they do not provide enough goods show the abuse of his power and authority over them. Certainly slavery is legal at this time. But Ballio could still show some consideration and care for his charges as fellow human beings. Such is not the case. His abuse would most likely have resonated with other women in his audience. (Nathan Johnston).

The evils of greed: Ballio, the local pimp, exemplifies the concept of greed manifested in man. He constantly asserts that anything not involving the exchange of money is not worth his time, even insisting that he will halt in the process of offering a sacrifice to Jove if he comes across a proposition worth his time. This greed has stained his reputation, his personal relationships, and even his view of himself, considering that he revels in his own wickedness. An example of his far-reaching greed makes its appearance at the beginning of the play when he agrees to sell Phoenicium to the Macedonian officer, Polymachaeroplagides. Although he has a previous arrangement with Calidorus, a promise that Calidorus can buy Phoenicium when he saves enough money, in the face of another offer, Ballio shows no loyalty or consideration for Calidorus, the person who truly loves the girl. Later when Ballio finds out that Pseudolus plans on winning the girl and his bet with Simo that he will indeed do so that very day, Ballio also agrees to a wager with Pseudolus with very little thought. His arrogance and greed make him willing to make a bet without giving it any consideration. He has ears for the money and greed has made him deaf.

Companionship as salvation: Phoenicium is a slave girl who is owned by Ballio. Calidorus, the son of Simo, a power individual, is in love with Phoenicium. The hero, Calidorus, does not have the money to save Phoenicium. A cunning slave, Pseudolus, finds out Calidorus's problem and convinces the two to unite. This unification is necessary for the hero Calidorus to be successful. Pseudolus uses his cunning and crafty brains to not only get the money from Simo, where Calidorus had failed, but furthermore to trick Ballio into freeing Phoenicium. Therefore, without Pseudolus Calidorus is not able to achieve the salvation of getting Phoenicium. Their unification and forthcoming companionship lead to the hero's happiness.

== Adaptations ==
- A Funny Thing Happened on the Way to the Forum shares basic plot, with a protagonist named Pseudolus
