= The Reading Aulos =

Ancient Greek musical artifact

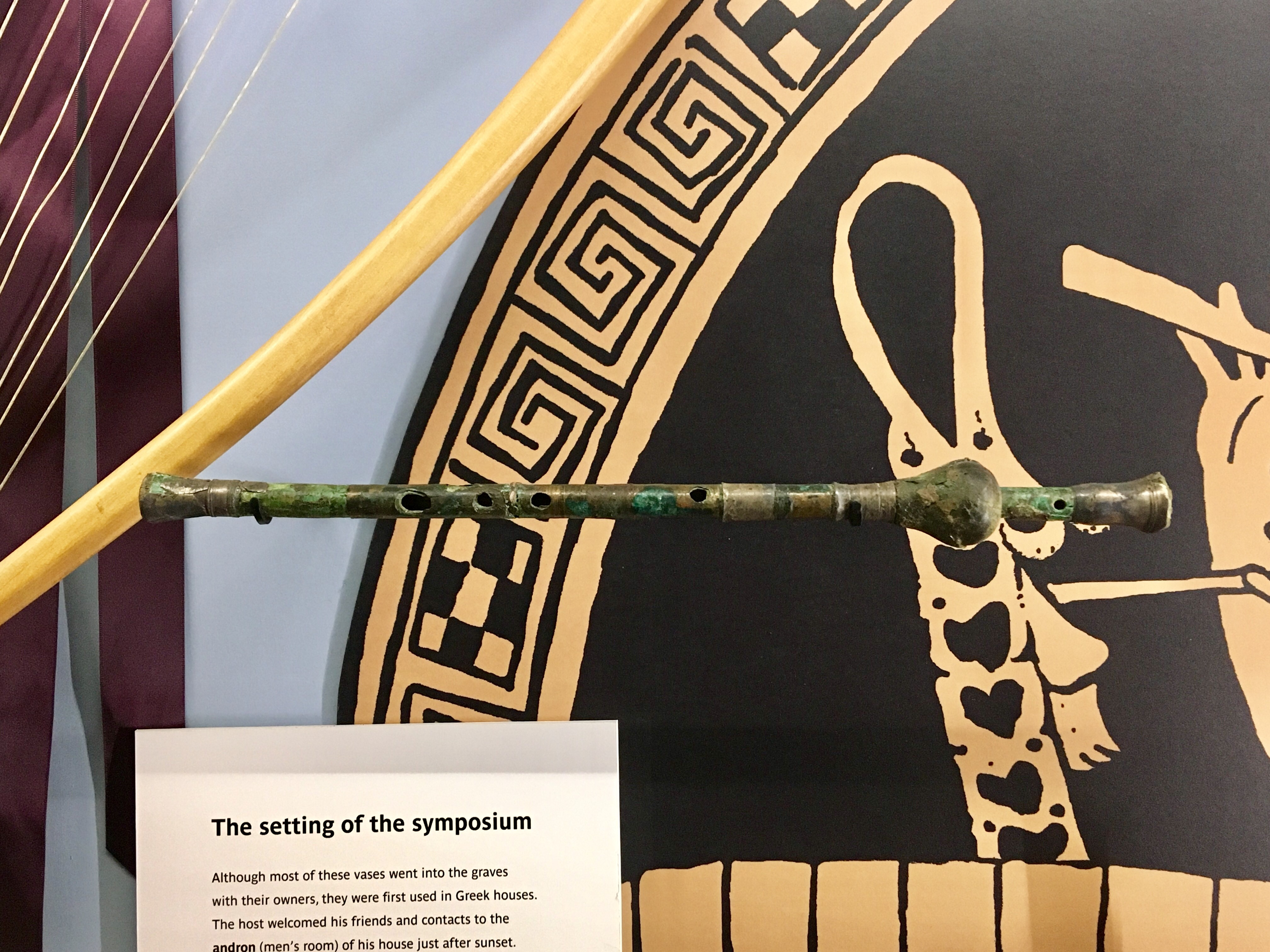
The Reading Aulos on display at the Ure Museum of Greek Archaeology

The Reading Aulos is the surviving half of an ancient Greek aulos (reed-blown double pipe). It is much more complete than other examples found to date, and is on permanent display at the Ure Museum of Greek Archaeology in Reading, England.

== Structure ==
The aulos has a length of 38 centimetres and is made of wood clad in bronze with sections decorated in silver. The bell-shaped top, missing the (detachable) reed required for playing, is made from bone or ivory and is covered in silver.

The top half features a prominent pear-shaped bulb which following water-damage has split revealing the make-up of the wooden core and the bronze cladding. Below this section the decoration of one of the silver foil bands can be clearly seen: elaborate ridges and grooves.

The lower half contains most of the holes used for playing the instrument and features further silver foil decoration (atop the bronze cladding); the end terminates in a similar bell-shaped form as the top.

Unlike other auloi, the Reading Aulos's bronze cladding appears to be the method for holding the sections securely together rather than the more common use of spigot-and-socket joints. Due to corrosion the bronze cladding has lost all its original finish.

Since acquisition by the museum restorative work has been performed to correctly align the lower section of the lower half with the rest of the instrument.

== Acquisition ==
The aulos was purchased by the museum from a Sotheby's auction in 1967 for the sum of £100 (with financial aid from The Trustees of the Victoria & Albert Museum). As was also the case with the museum's acquisition of the Etruscan amphora showing Troilos, it was considered an undervalued item – its original clumsy restoration is believed to have been the primary reason for this.

Little, if anything, is known of its provenance. Dr J G Landels, an expert in ancient music and a member of the University of Reading's Department of Classics, dated the instrument to no earlier than the 4th century BC, and believed it to be most likely from Asia Minor.

Following purchase, Landels completed a detailed study of the instrument in 1968 and published his findings in The Annual of the British School at Athens.

== Display ==
The Reading Aulos, as it later became known, is a prominent item in the museum's collection, and is on permanent display, freely available to view by the public. In 2018 it was selected, along with other items from the Ure and the British Museum, to be a central feature of the major exhibition 'Music and Materiality' held at the museum.
