= Wilhelm Siegmund Teuffel =

German classical scholar (1820–1878)

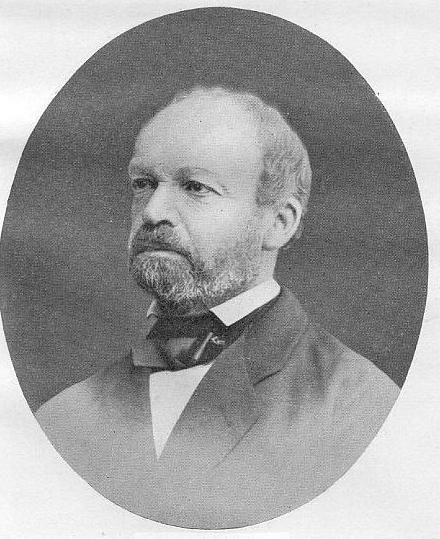
Wilhelm Siegmund Teuffel

Wilhelm Siegmund Teuffel (German: [ˈtɔɪfəl]; September 27, 1820 – March 8, 1878), German classical scholar, was born at Ludwigsburg in the Kingdom of Württemberg. In 1849 he was appointed extraordinary, in 1857 ordinary professor in the University of Tübingen, which post he held till his death in Tübingen.

== Works ==
Teuffel's most important work was his Geschichte der römischen Litteratur (1870); revisions by Ludwig Schwabe, Wilhelm Kroll and Franz Skutsch carried this to a 6th–7th edition (1913–1920).

An English translation of the 5th edition by George Charles Winter Warr was published in 1891–1892, as Teuffel's History of Roman Literature. The Encyclopædia Britannica Eleventh Edition described Teuffel's history as "written in an unattractive style" but "indispensable to the student" especially for its "bibliographical information", and Warr's translation is described in the 1996 Oxford Classical Dictionary as "still useful on details".

After the death of August Pauly, the editor of the well-known Realencyclopädie der classischen Altertumswissenschaft, Teuffel, at first assisted by Ernst Christian Walz, undertook the completion of the work, to which he also contributed numerous articles.

He was also the author of

- "Prolegomena zur Chronologie der horazischen Geschichte" (in Zeitschrift für die Altertumswissenschaft, 1842)
- Charakteristik des Horaz (Leipzig, 1842)
- Horaz, eine litterar-historische Übersicht (Tübingen, 1843),

and of editions of

- The Clouds of Aristophanes (1856)
- The Persians of Aeschylus (1866).

His Studien und Charakteristiken (1871; 2nd ed., 1889) contain valuable contributions to the history of Greek and Roman literature.
