= Professor of Latin (University College London) =

The Professorship in Latin at University College London (UCL) is one of the original professorships at UCL. Along with the Professorship in Greek, the chair dates back to the foundations of the university in the 1820s. The first holder was the Rev. John Williams, "but he resigned in June, 1828, in deference to the opposition of his ecclesiastical superiors to the secular character of the university". Williams was succeeded by T. Hewitt Key, who was a founder of University College School and served as Head Master as well as Professor. The chair, which is a full-time position, has been occupied by a series of distinguished scholars including J. R. Seeley, Robinson Ellis, A. E. Housman, H. E. Butler, Otto Skutsch, George Goold, and Malcolm Willcock.

== List of holders ==
The following have held the chair of Latin:

- J. Williams, 1826–1828
- Thomas Hewitt Key, 1828–1842
- George Long, 1842–1846
- Francis William Newman, 1846–1863
- John Robert Seeley, 1863–1870
- Robinson Ellis, 1870–1876
- Alfred Goodwin, 1876–1880 (also Professor of Greek, 1879–1892)
- A. J. Church, 1880–1889
- Alfred Goodwin, 1889–1892 (second tenure)
- A. E. Housman, 1892–1911
- Harold Edgeworth Butler, 1911–1942
- Otto Skutsch, 1951–1972
- G. P. Goold, 1973–1978
- Malcolm Willcock, 1980–1991
- Gerard O'Daly, 1991–2004
- Maria Wyke, 2005–present

== See also ==
- Corpus Christi Professor of Latin, University of Oxford
- Giger Professor of Latin, Princeton University
- Kennedy Professor of Latin, University of Cambridge
- Professor of Greek, University College London
- Sather Professorship of Classical Literature, University of California, Berkeley

== Sources ==
- H. Hale Bellot, University College, London, 1826-1926, London, 1929.
- R. B. Todd, ed., The Dictionary of British Classicists, 3 vols., Bristol, 2004.
- P. G. Naiditch, A. E. Housman at University College, London: the election of 1892, Leiden, 1988.
- [W. P. Ker, ed.], Notes and materials for the history of University College, London, London, 1898
- Christopher Stray, Classics Transformed: Schools, Universities, and Society in England, 1830-1960, Oxford, 1998.
- University of London Calendar
