= Johann Heinrich Christian Schubart =

German writer and classical philologist

Johann Heinrich Christian Schubart (28 February 1800, Marburg – 1 May 1885, Kassel) was a German classical philologist and librarian.

From 1816 to 1820 he studied ancient history at the University of Marburg, then continued his education at Heidelberg as a student of Friedrich Creuzer and Friedrich Christoph Schlosser. He obtained his doctorate in Marburg with the dissertation thesis De Hyperboreis, and for several years worked as a private tutor for various families of nobility in Württemberg and Austria. During this time period, he was also associated with the Heidelberger Jahrbücher (from 1825) and the Wiener Jahrbücher (from 1829).

In 1834 he was named secretary at the Landesbibliothek Kassel, where he later obtained the positions of second librarian (1850) and first librarian (1874). In 1834 he was co-founder of the Verein für hessische Geschichte und Landeskunde (Association for Hessian history and geography), of which he was also an editor of its journal.

== Published works ==
He is best remembered for his studies of Pausanias, and with Ernst Christian Walz, he published a three-volume edition on the ancient Greek geographer, titled Pausaniae Descriptio Graeciae (1838–39). Later on, he published a smaller version (2 volumes, 1854–55) and also an edition that was translated into German as Beschreibung von Griechenland (1857–63).

- De Hyperboreis : commentatio inauguralis, (dissertation) 1825.
- Quaestiones genealogicae historicae in antiquitatem heroicam graecam, 1832.
- Pausaniae Descriptio Graeciae, (with Ernst Christian Walz) 3 volumes, 1838-39.
- Leben und thaten des durchleuchtigsten fursten und herren Philippi Magnanimi : Landgraffen Zu Hessen (edition of Wigand Lauze; with Karl Bernhardi, 2 volumes in 5) 1841-47.
- Bruchstücke zu einer Methodologie der diplomatischen Kritik, 1855.
- Ueber den zweiten und dritten Hauptabschnitt des Platonischen Theätet, 1869 – a treatise involving Plato's Theatetus.
