= Ernst Christian Walz =

German classical philologist (1802–1857)

Ernst Christian Walz (February 28, 1802 – April 5, 1857) was a German classical philologist and archaeologist born in Münklingen, in present-day Baden-Württemberg.

He was a student and later a teacher at Tübinger Stift in Tübingen. In 1832 he became an associate professor, and in 1836 a full professor of classical philology at the University of Tübingen as well as director of the archaeological collection of the Philological Seminar.

Walz made several contributions in the field of classical Greek philology, being remembered for an edition of a series of ancient Greek rhetorical works known as "Rhetores Graeci" (1832–36, nine volumes). In 1838-39, with Johann Heinrich Christian Schubart, he published an edition of Pausanias ("Pausianae Descriptio Graeciae"). After the death of August Pauly in 1845, Walz, along with encyclopedist Wilhelm Siegmund Teuffel (1820-1858), took over publication of the "Realencyclopädie der Classischen Altertumswissenschaft", an encyclopedia in which he was an author of various archaeological and mythological subjects.
