= Wilhelm Kroll =

German classicist (1869–1939)

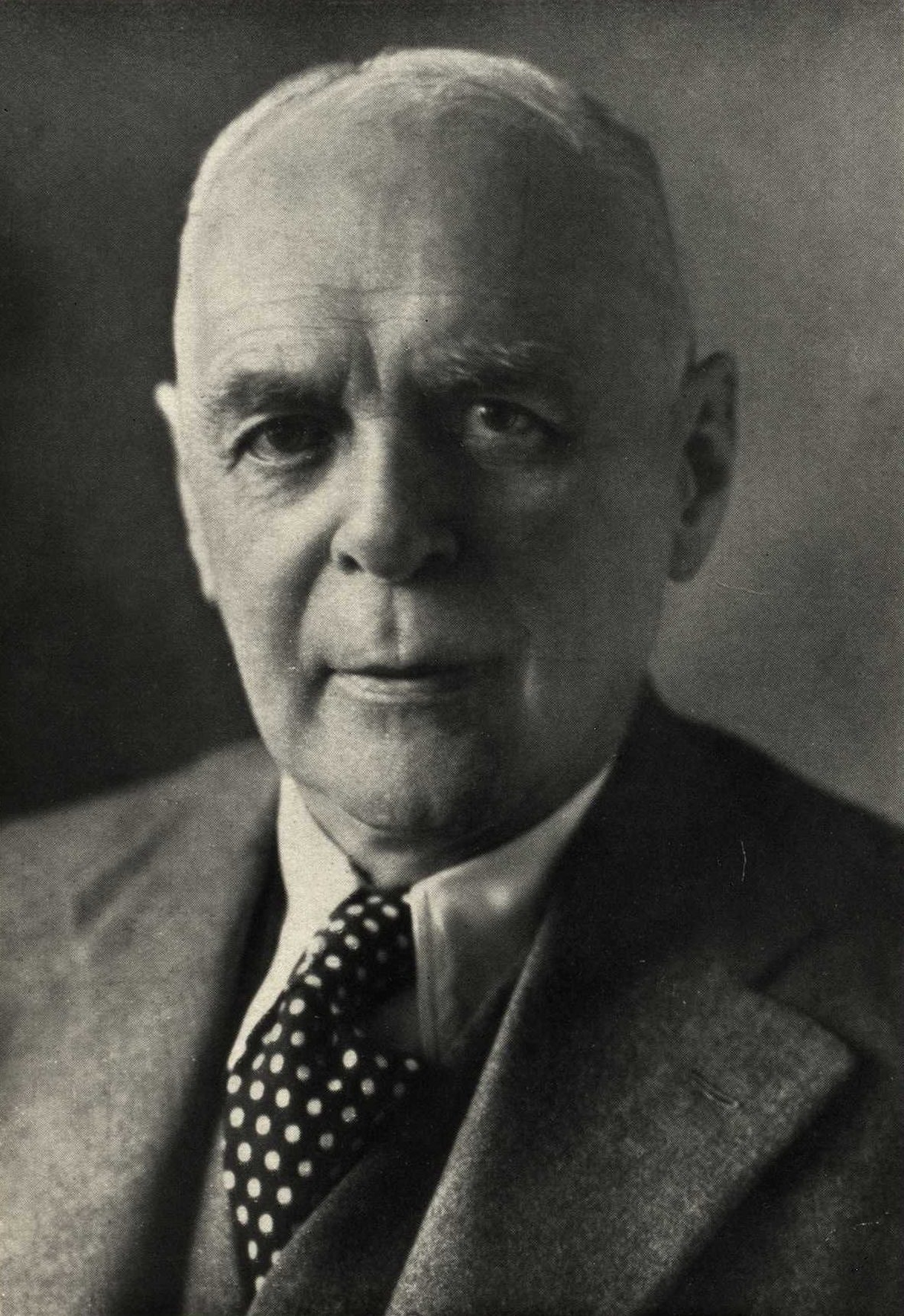
Wilhelm Kroll

Wilhelm Kroll (/kroʊl/; German: [kʁɔl]; October 7, 1869 – April 21, 1939) was a German classicist who was a full professor at the Universities of Greifswald (1899–1906), Münster (1906–1913) and Breslau (1913–1935).

== Education and career ==
Kroll was born in the town of Frankenstein in the Prussian Province of Silesia and brought up in Breslau, the capital city. From 1887 to 1891 he studied Classics, Archeology, History and Sanskrit at the universities of Breslau and Berlin. After obtaining his Ph.D. in 1891, Kroll went to Italy for the first of many times to study Greek manuscripts in Florence and Venice and continued his studies at the University of Bonn in the summer term of 1892.

Before the end of the term, he was awarded a four-year scholarship by the Prussian Academy of Sciences that gave him the means to further his academic career. Kroll returned to Italy where he continued and expanded his research from September 1893 until April 1894. Having obtained his habilitation at Breslau University in 1894, he continued to teach and publish as Privatdozent. After five years he was appointed full professor of Classics at the University of Greifswald where he started teaching in April 1899. A year later he married Katharina Wegener, the daughter of a schoolmaster.

In March 1906, Kroll moved to the University of Münster, a newly adorned university with a significant number of students. In Münster, Kroll strove to enhance the quality of studying for his students. His efforts to cooperate with his colleagues led to the foundation of the Institut für Altertumskunde (Institute for Antiquity Studies) which included the departments of classics, ancient history and linguistics (the archaeology department followed suit in 1914). Building upon his success Kroll tried to secure a better position for himself and in 1913 finally obtained a chair at his alma mater in Breslau.

Apart from his teaching and publications, Kroll was an important agent for international collaboration in the classics. As an editor of important journals (Bursian’s Jahresbericht über die Fortschritte der klassischen Altertumswissenschaft, 1898–1912; Glotta, 1913–1936) and the Realencyclopädie der Classischen Altertumswissenschaft (1906–1939, as successor to Georg Wissowa) he collaborated with hundreds of scholars from all over Europe and the United States. He was one of the first German scholars to be invited to lecture in the United Kingdom after World War I, and was awarded a visiting professorship at the Princeton University in 1930/31.

His last years were overcast by the rise of Nazism in Germany. In 1934 he resigned as president of the Silesian Society for Patriotic Culture, a learned association that he had headed since 1927. In 1935, under new legislation, Kroll retired earlier than usual. As his successor, he opted for his long-time colleague Hans Drexler who had been an active supporter of the Nazi party. Drexler would later write Kroll's obituary in the Gnomon, apologising for his predecessor's alleged lack of a positive worldview.

While not being a victim of the Nuremberg Laws himself, Kroll witnessed the removal of his colleagues from office and the persecution of his former pupils, some of whom he aided in finding work abroad. He also continued to collaborate with Jewish scholars in editing the Realencyclopädie. For this Kroll was assaulted in the Nazi newspaper Der Stürmer, after he had already relocated to Berlin with his wife early in 1937.

Meanwhile, academic institutions continued to appreciate and honor Kroll's achievement. He was elected ordinary member of the German Archeological Institute in 1934, corresponding member of the Austrian Academy of Sciences in 1935 and Fellow of the British Academy in 1937. He was also awarded honorary degrees by the universities of Oxford (1935) and Cambridge (1938).

After an operation, Kroll died of an embolism on April 21, 1939 in Berlin. He was survived by his wife, his daughter and three sons, one of whom had emigrated to Japan in 1936 and later became a renowned physicist at the University of Taipei.

== Literary works ==
- An editor of the "Realencyclopädie der Classischen Altertumswissenschaft" (since 1906; after August Pauly, Georg Wissowa)
- Geschichte der klassischen Philologie. 1908;
  2. verb. Aufl. Vereining. wissenschaftl. Verl., Berlin und Leipzig 1919 (Sammlung Göschen, 367)
- C. Valerius Catullus. 1922;
  7. Aufl. Teubner, Stuttgart 1989, ISBN 3-519-24001-7
- Die wissenschaftliche Syntax im lateinischen Unterricht. Weidmann, 1925
- Studien zum Verständnis der römischen Literatur. Metzler, Stuttgart 1924
  Nachdruck Garland, New York und London 1978, ISBN 0-8240-2972-0
- Die Kultur der ciceronischen Zeit. 2 Teile. Dieterich, Leipzig 1933
  Nachdruck Wissenschaftliche Buchgesellschaft, Darmstadt 1975, ISBN 3-534-01542-8
- Rhetorik, 1937

== Critical editions ==
- Vettii Valentis Anthologiarum Libri, Guilelmus Kroll, Weidman, Berlin, 1908.
- Matheseos Libri VIII, 2 vols., ed. W. Kroll, F. Skutsch and K. Ziegler, Teubner, Stuttgart, 1897–1913.
- Historia Alexandri Magni, ed. W. Kroll, vol. 1. Weidmann, Berlin, 1926.

== See also ==
- Cicero
- August Pauly
- Wilhelm Siegmund Teuffel
- Vettius Valens
- Georg Wissowa
