= Double flute =

Ancient Wind Instrument

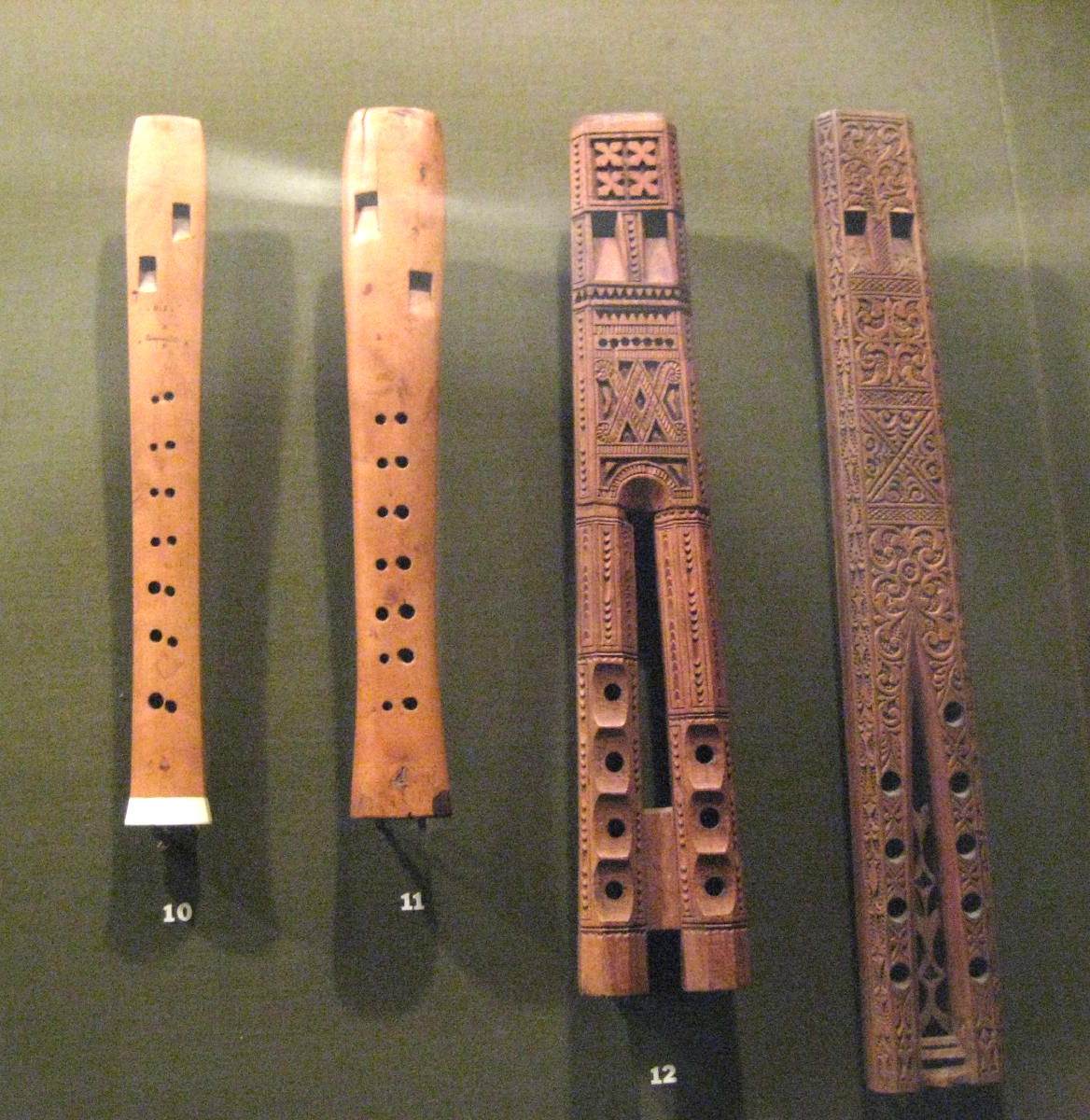
European double flutes

The double flute is an ancient category of wind instrument, a set of flutes that falls under more than one modern category in the Hornbostel Sachs system of musical instrument classification. The flutes may be double because they have parallel pipes that are connected with a single duct. They may be "double vertical flutes" without a duct. There are also double-transverse flutes.

Double flutes are not the same as double pipes, which are reed instruments.

== Background ==
Flutes use resonant pipes to make their sound, whereas pipes use vibrating reeds. The sounding mechanisms for the two types of instrument are different.

Double flutes can be divided into instruments that consist of a melody pipe matched with a drone pipe, and chord flutes in which the instruments can play the same melody at the same time in two different pitches.

Some forms of double flute include:

- some types of Native American flutes
- the Albanian Cylja Dyjare, still played in southern parts of the country by shepherds.
- the Bulgarian dvoyanka
- the Croatian dvojnice
- the Indian and Pakistani Alghoza
- the Iranian and Pakistani Donali, pair of fipple flutes
- the Russian double svirel, pair of fipple flutes

Some forms that are reed pipes, not double flutes include:

- the ancient Greek aulos or Roman tibia (double-reed) pipes, played in pairs.
- the Indian and Pakistani pungi, reed pipes
- Mijwiz

== Gallery ==
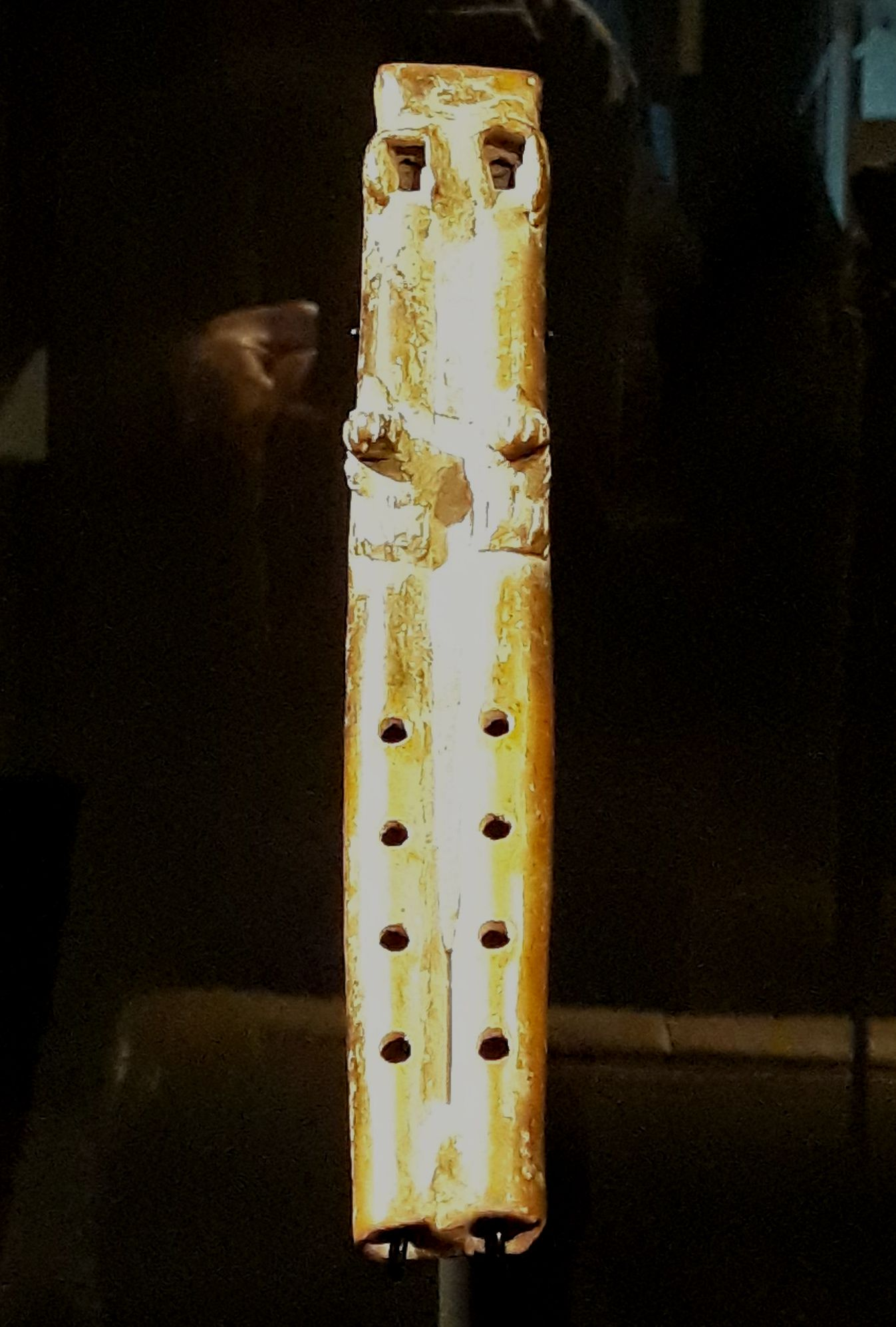
Aztec double flute uses an air duct to produce sound through the holes in the top of each pipe.

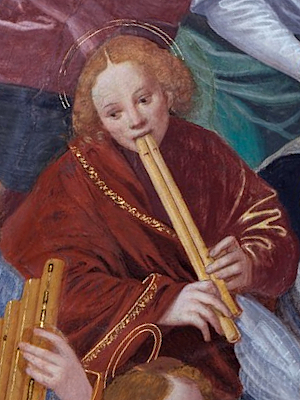
European variant from the Renaissance.

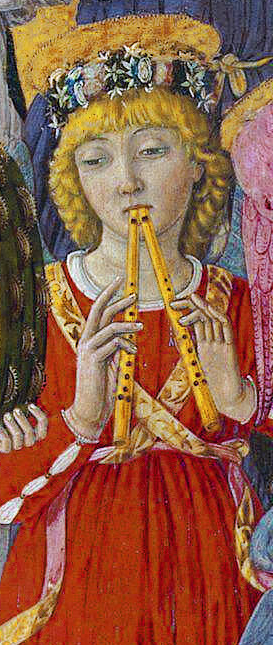
Renaissance recorders played double.

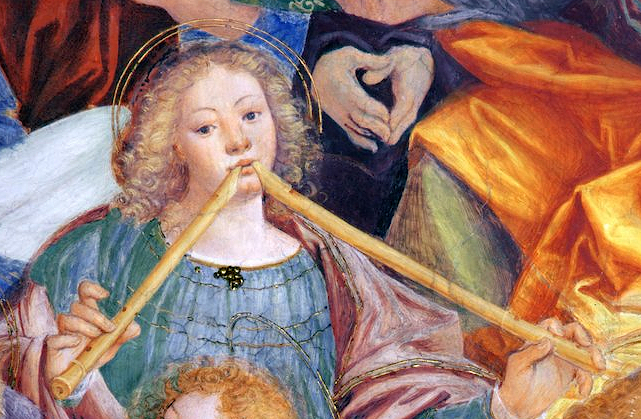
3-hole tabor-pipes played in a pair, Renaissance.
