= Franz Skutsch =

German classical philologist and linguist (1865–1912)

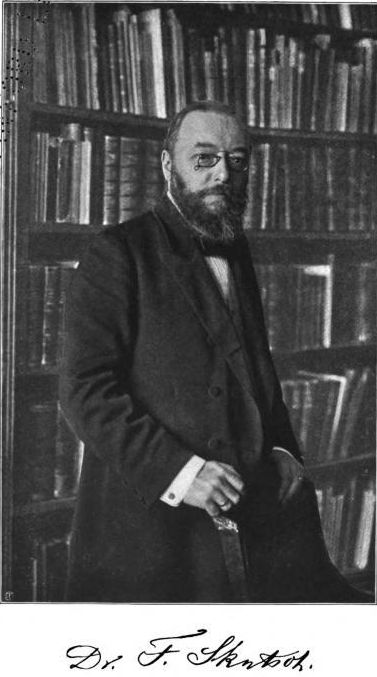
Franz Skutsch (1865–1912)

Franz Skutsch (6 January 1865 – 29 September 1912) was a German classical philologist and linguist born in Neisse. He was the father of classical philologist Otto Skutsch (1906–1990).

He studied classical philology and Indo-European studies at the Universities of Heidelberg and Breslau, where he was a student of Georg Wissowa (1859–1931). In 1888 he earned his doctorate at the University of Bonn, later obtaining his habilitation at Breslau in 1890. In 1896 he became a full professor at the University of Breslau and the successor to Friedrich Marx (1859–1941).

Skutsch is remembered for his expert linguistic/philological treatment of the Roman playwright Plautus, being the author of the acclaimed "Plautinisches und Romanisches" (1892). With linguist Paul Kretschmer (1866–1956) he was co-founder of the journal Glotta.

He was an honorary member of the Gesellschaft der Wissenschaften in Athen (Society of Sciences in Athens), and a corresponding member of the Bavarian Academy.

== Selected written works ==
- Plautinisches und Romanisches. Forschungen zur lateinischen Grammatik und Metrik (Plautine and Romanesque; Research on Latin grammar and metrics), volume 1, 1892.
- Aus Vergils Frühzeit (From the early days of Virgil), 1901.
- Gallus und Vergil (Cornelius Gallus and Virgil), 1906.
- Kleine Schriften (Smaller works; edited by Wilhelm Kroll), 1914.
