= Otto Skutsch =

German classical philologist

Otto Skutsch (6 December 1906 – 8 December 1990) was a German-born British classicist and academic, specialising in classical philology. He was Professor of Latin at University College London from 1951 to 1972.

== Early life ==
Skutsch was born on 6 December 1906 in Breslau, then in the German Empire. He was the third child of Franz Skutsch, a German classical philologist. He was six years old when his father died. He was educated at the Friedrichs-Gymnasium in Breslau. He then studied at the University of Breslau, the University of Kiel, the University of Berlin, and the University of Göttingen. He completed his Doctor of Philosophy (PhD) degree at Göttingen in 1934. Because his father was Jewish, Skutsch saw the rise of the Nazi Party as a threat to himself, and so he left Germany for the United Kingdom sometime in 1934 or 1935.

== Academic career ==
Having arrived in the United Kingdom, Skutsch secured a post at the University of St Andrews as a research assistant working on the compilation a dictionary of Latin. This was achieved through W. M. Lindsay, a professor at St Andrews who had had great respect for Skutsch's father. From 1938 to 1939, he was a senior assistant at Queen's University Belfast. With the outbreak of World War II in September 1939, he was interned for the extent of the war as an enemy alien. He was granted British citizenship in 1946.

In 1949, he joined the University of Manchester as a senior lecturer in classics. In 1951, he was appointed Professor of Latin at University College London. In 1972, he retired and was appointed professor emeritus. From 1972 to 1973 and again in 1981, he was Visiting Andrew Mellon Professor of Classics at the University of Pittsburgh.

== Personal life ==
In 1938, Skutsch married Gillian Stewart. She was the daughter of Sir Findlater Stewart, a senior civil servant. Together, they had four children; one son and three daughters.
