= Aulos =

Ancient Greek wind instrument

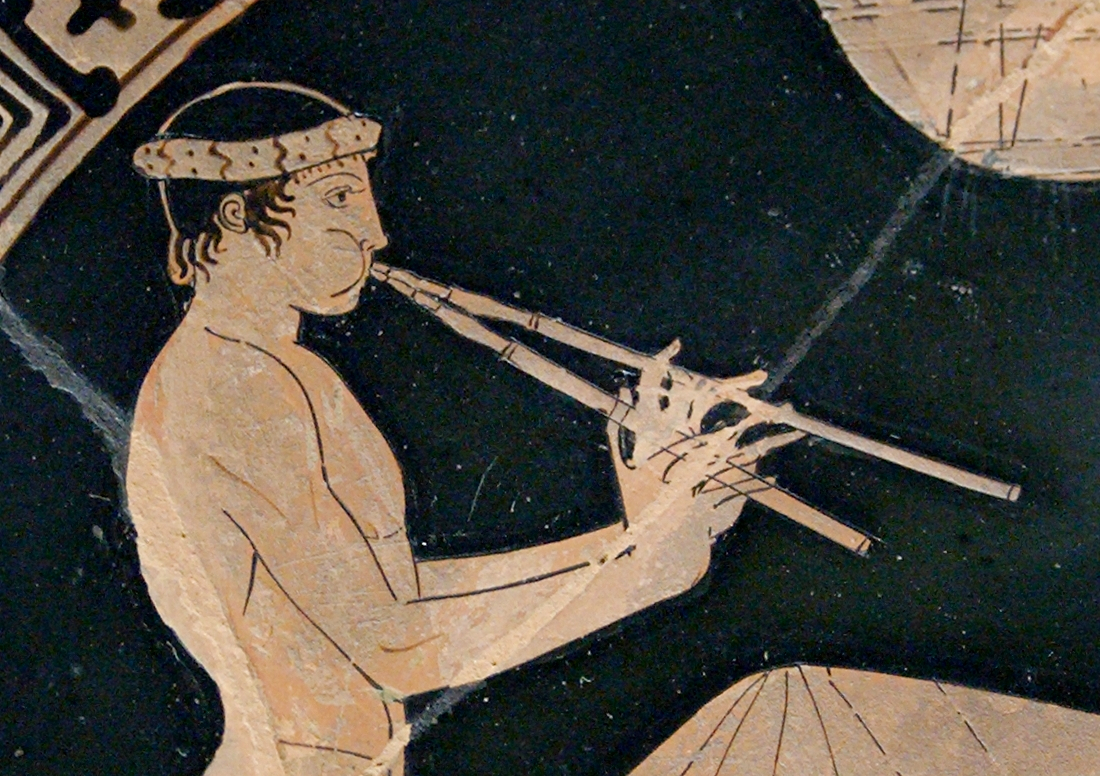
- Man playing an aulos: Attic red-figure cup painted by the Euaion Painter, 460 B.C.–450 B.C.

Woodwind instrument
- Classification: woodwind
- Hornbostel–Sachs classification: Reed aerophones: 422.121.2 (Double reed instruments – two lamellae beat against one another, double oboes with fingerholes.)

Related instruments
- Launeddas · Rhaita · Shawm · Sopila; Sorna · Suona · Tibia · Tsampouna · Tulum · Zampogna · Zurna

Sound sample

In Ancient Greek music, an aulos (Ancient Greek: αὐλός; plural auloi, αὐλοί) was a wind instrument often depicted in art and also attested by archaeology.

Though the word aulos is often translated as "flute" or as "double flute", the instrument was usually double-reeded, and its sound—described as "penetrating, insisting and exciting"—was more akin to that of modern woodwind instruments such as oboes or bagpipes with a chanter and (modulated) drone.

An aulete (αὐλητής) was the musician who performed on an aulos. The ancient Roman equivalent was the tibicen (plural tibicines), who played the tibia. The neologism aulode is sometimes used by analogy with rhapsode and citharode (citharede) to refer to an aulos-player, who may also be called an aulist; however, aulode more commonly refers to a singer who sang the accompaniment to a piece played on the aulos.

== Background ==
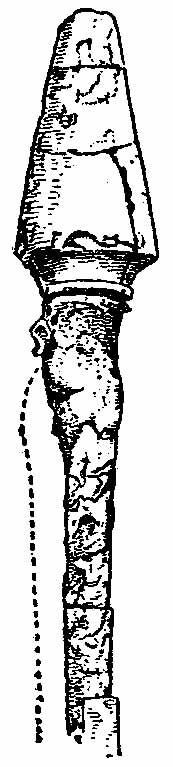
Drawing of the mouthpiece of an aulos.

There were several kinds of aulos, single or double. The most common variety was a reed instrument. Archeological finds, surviving iconography and other evidence indicate that it was double-reeded, like the modern oboe, but with a larger mouthpiece, like the surviving Armenian duduk. A single pipe without a reed was called the monaulos (μόναυλος, from μόνος "single"). A single pipe held horizontally, as the modern flute, was the plagiaulos (πλαγίαυλος, from πλάγιος "sideways"). A pipe with a bag to allow for continuous sound (a bagpipe) was the askaulos (ἀσκαυλός from ἀσκός askos "wineskin").

Like the Great Highland Bagpipe, the aulos has been used for martial music, but it is more frequently depicted in other social settings. A normal flute would produce insufficient volume to be of any use in military application, where a double-reed could be heard over larger distances, and over the clamour of marching whilst wearing armour. It was the standard accompaniment of the passionate elegiac poetry. It also accompanied physical activities such as wrestling matches, the broad jump, the discus throw and to mark the rowing cadence on triremes, as well as sacrifices and dramas. Plato associates it with the ecstatic cults of Dionysus and the Korybantes, banning it from his Republic but permitting it in his Laws.

Players of the aulos used a tool known as the Phorbeia or the Capistrum. It was a device that consisted of two straps. One was placed on top of the head and another was placed on the back of the head and stretched from ear to ear to support the cheeks. It was used by ancient musicians to play the aulos by allowing them to create noise through circular breathing and steady the instrument. It may have also been used to prevent the reeds of the instrument from falling down the throat of the player. Another potential use for the phrobeia was holding the lips in place, taking some strain off of the lip muscles.

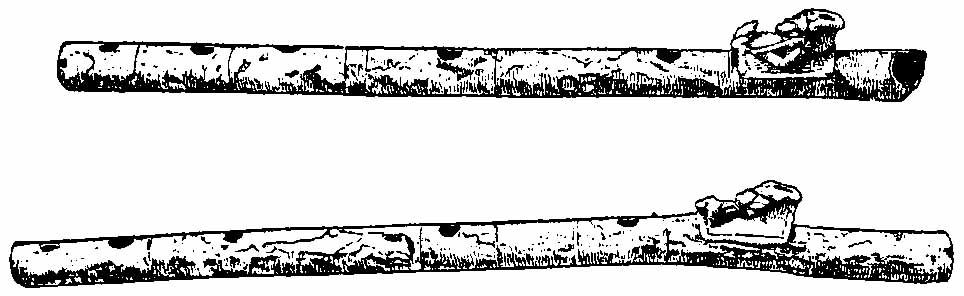
Drawing of a plagiaulos.

Although aristocrats with sufficient leisure sometimes practiced aulos-playing as they did the lyre, after the later fifth century the aulos became chiefly associated with professional musicians, often slaves. Nevertheless, such musicians could achieve fame. The Romano-Greek writer Lucian discusses aulos playing in his dialogue Harmonides, in which Alexander the Great's aulete Timotheus discusses fame with his pupil Harmonides. Timotheus advises him to impress the experts within his profession rather than seek popular approval in big public venues. If leading musicians admire him, popular approval will follow. However, Lucian reports that Harmonides died from excessive blowing during practicing.

== Mythic origin ==
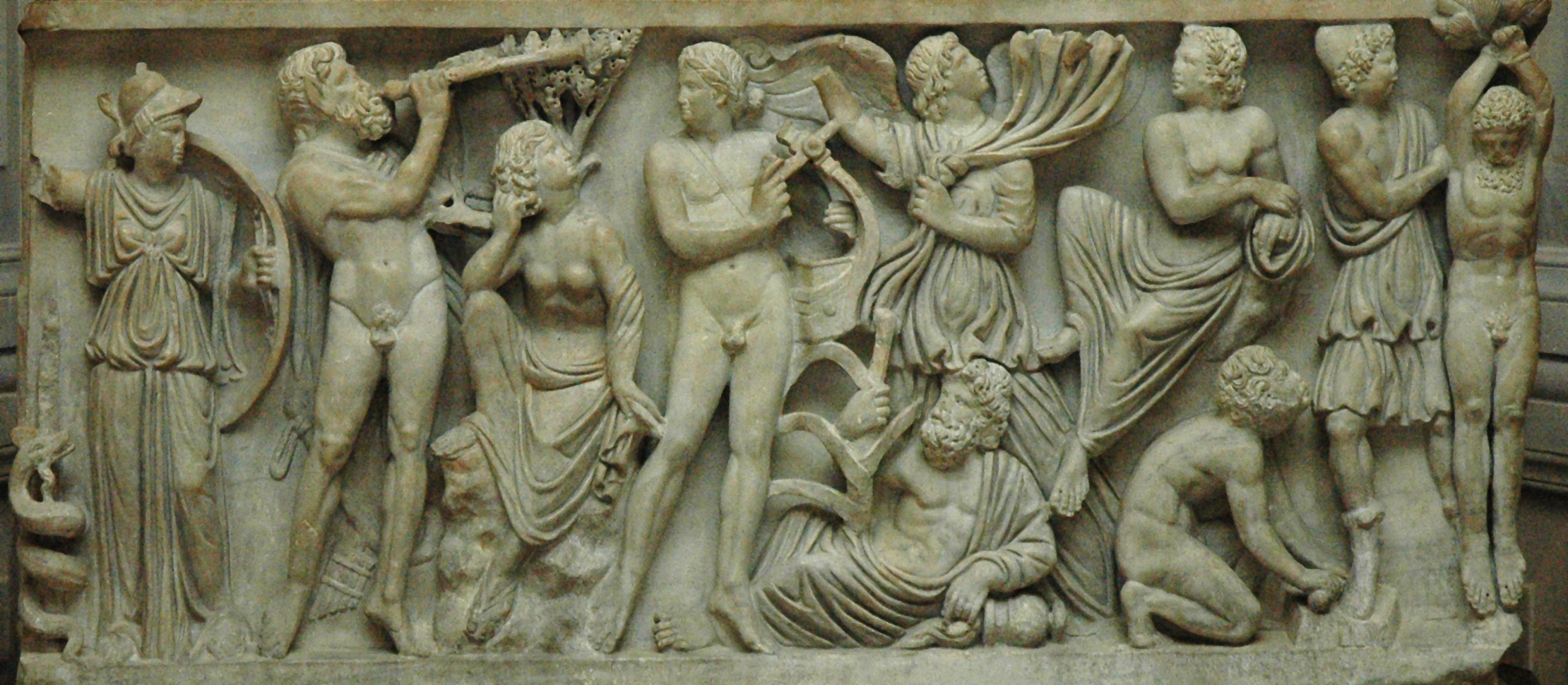
The competition between Marsyas and Apollo on a Roman sarcophagus (290–300)

In myth, Marsyas the satyr was supposed to have invented the aulos, or else picked it up after Athena had thrown it away because it caused her cheeks to puff out and ruined her beauty. In any case, he challenged Apollo to a musical contest, where the winner would be able to "do whatever he wanted" to the loser—Marsyas's expectation, typical of a satyr, was that this would be sexual in nature. But Apollo and his lyre beat Marsyas and his aulos.

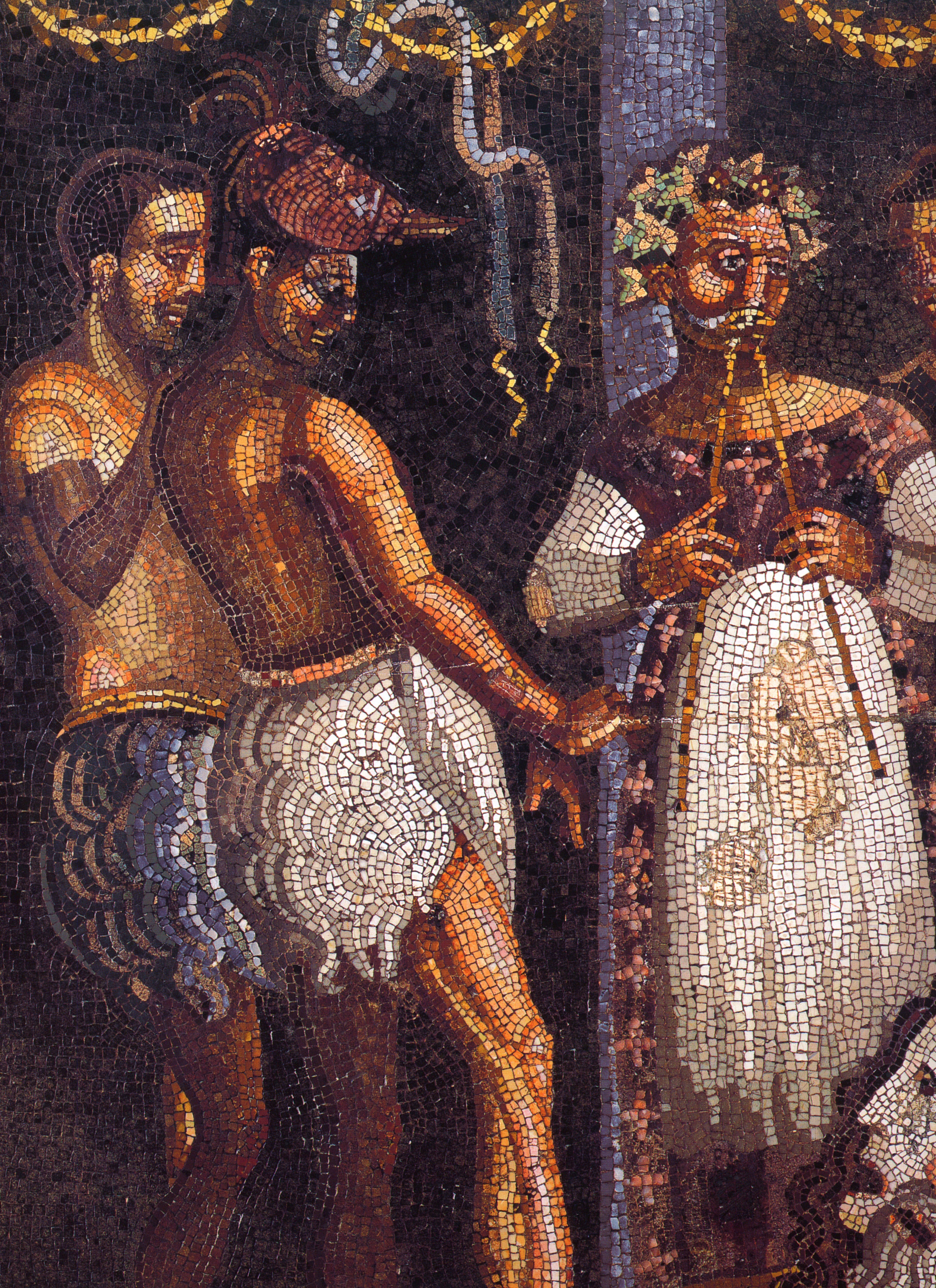
Theatrical scene from a Pompeiian mosaic showing a performer with an aulos and phorbeiá.

Marsyas's blood and the tears of the Muses formed the river Marsyas in Asia Minor.

This tale was a warning against committing the sin of "hubris", or overweening pride, in that Marsyas thought he might win against a god. Strange and brutal as it is, this myth reflects a great many cultural tensions that the Greeks expressed in the opposition they often drew between the lyre and aulos: freedom vs. servility and tyranny, leisured amateurs vs. professionals, moderation (sophrosyne) vs. excess, etc. Some of this is a result of 19th century AD "classical interpretation", i.e. Apollo versus Dionysus, or "Reason" (represented by the kithara) opposed to "Madness" (represented by the aulos). In the temple to Apollo at Delphi, there was also a shrine to Dionysus, and his Maenads are shown on drinking cups playing the aulos, but Dionysus is sometimes shown holding a kithara or lyre. So a modern interpretation can be a little more complicated than just simple duality.

This opposition is mostly an Athenian one. It might be surmised that things were different at Thebes, which was a center of aulos-playing. At Sparta—which had no Bacchic or Korybantic cults to serve as contrast—the aulos was actually associated with Apollo, and accompanied the hoplites into battle.

== Depiction in art ==
=== Chigi vase ===
The battle scene on the Chigi vase shows an aulos player setting a lyrical rhythm for the hoplite phalanx to advance to. This accompaniment reduced the possibility of an opening in the formation of the blockage; the aulete had a fundamental role in ensuring the integrity of the phalanx. In this particular scene, the phalanx approaching from the left is unprepared and momentarily outnumbered four to five. More soldiers can be seen running up to assist them from behind. Even though the front four are lacking a fifth soldier, they have the advantage because the aulete is there to bring the formation back together.

=== Herakles in his tenth labor ===
An amphora from c. 540–530 BC depicts Herakles in the process of completing his tenth labor. Auletes can be seen playing in a procession going around on the neck of the amphora.

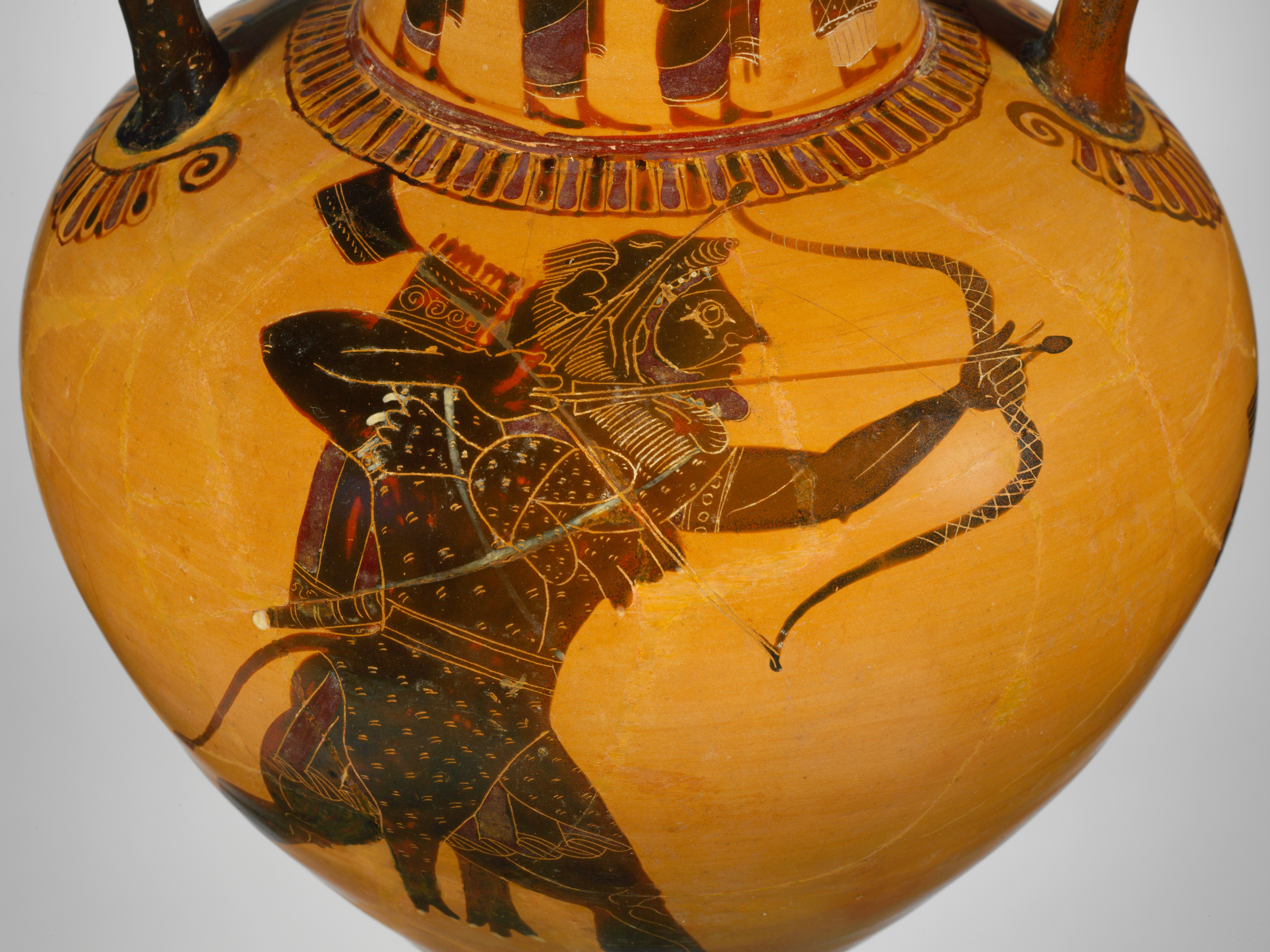
Herakles tenth labor

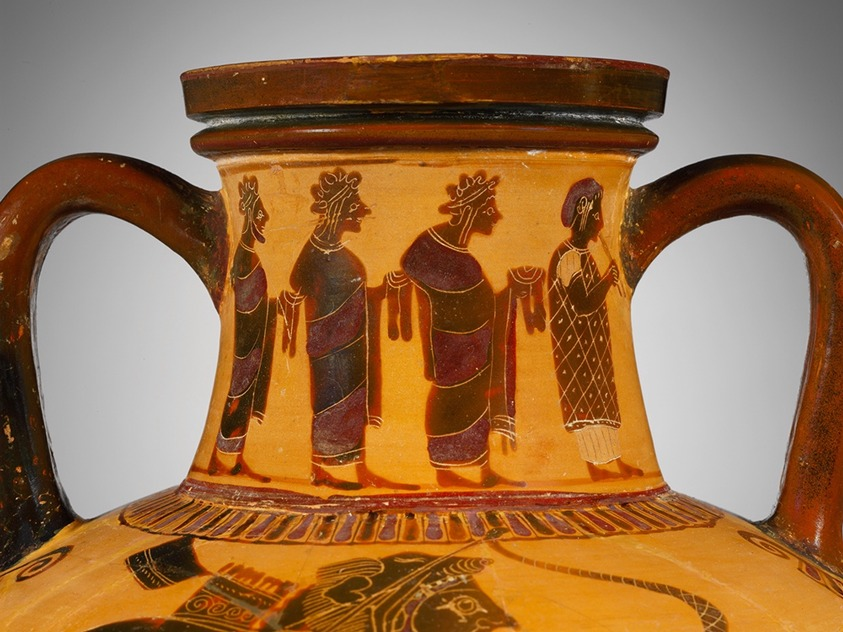
Neck of Herakles' tenth labor amphora

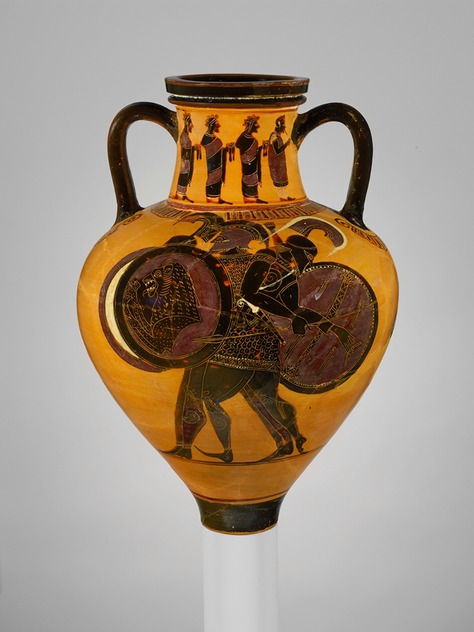
Geryon side of Herakles' tenth labor

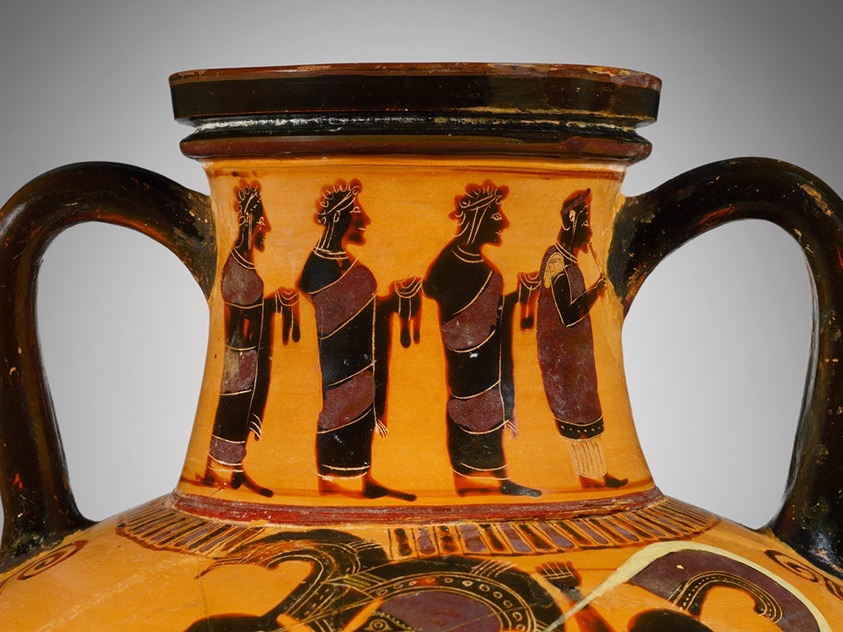
Neck of Geryon side of Herakles' tenth labor amphora

== Modern use and popular culture ==
The sounds of the aulos are being digitally recreated by the Ancient Instruments Sound/Timbre Reconstruction Application (ASTRA) project which uses physical modeling synthesis to simulate the aulos sounds. Due to the complexity of this process the ASTRA project uses grid computing to model sounds on hundreds of computers throughout Europe simultaneously.

The aulos is part of the Lost Sounds Orchestra, alongside other ancient instruments which ASTRA have recreated the sounds of, including the epigonion, the salpinx, the barbiton and the syrinx.

Various double flutes still exist in Southeastern Europe. In southern Albania, a double non-free aerophone – called the cula diare or cyla dyjare – is still played in the Labëria region to accompany Albanian iso-polyphony. It has been claimed that this instrument shares a history with the aulos. These instruments are primary fipple flutes, not double-reeded like the aulos of antiquity.

The aulos was also featured in the 2009 movie Agora, wherein a character performs a solo in an amphitheatre. It is also visible in the 2007 movie 300.

Composer Ludwig Göransson used a replica aulos created by Max Brumberg and played by Callum Armstrong for the score of the 2026 film adaptation of the Odyssey.

== Gallery ==
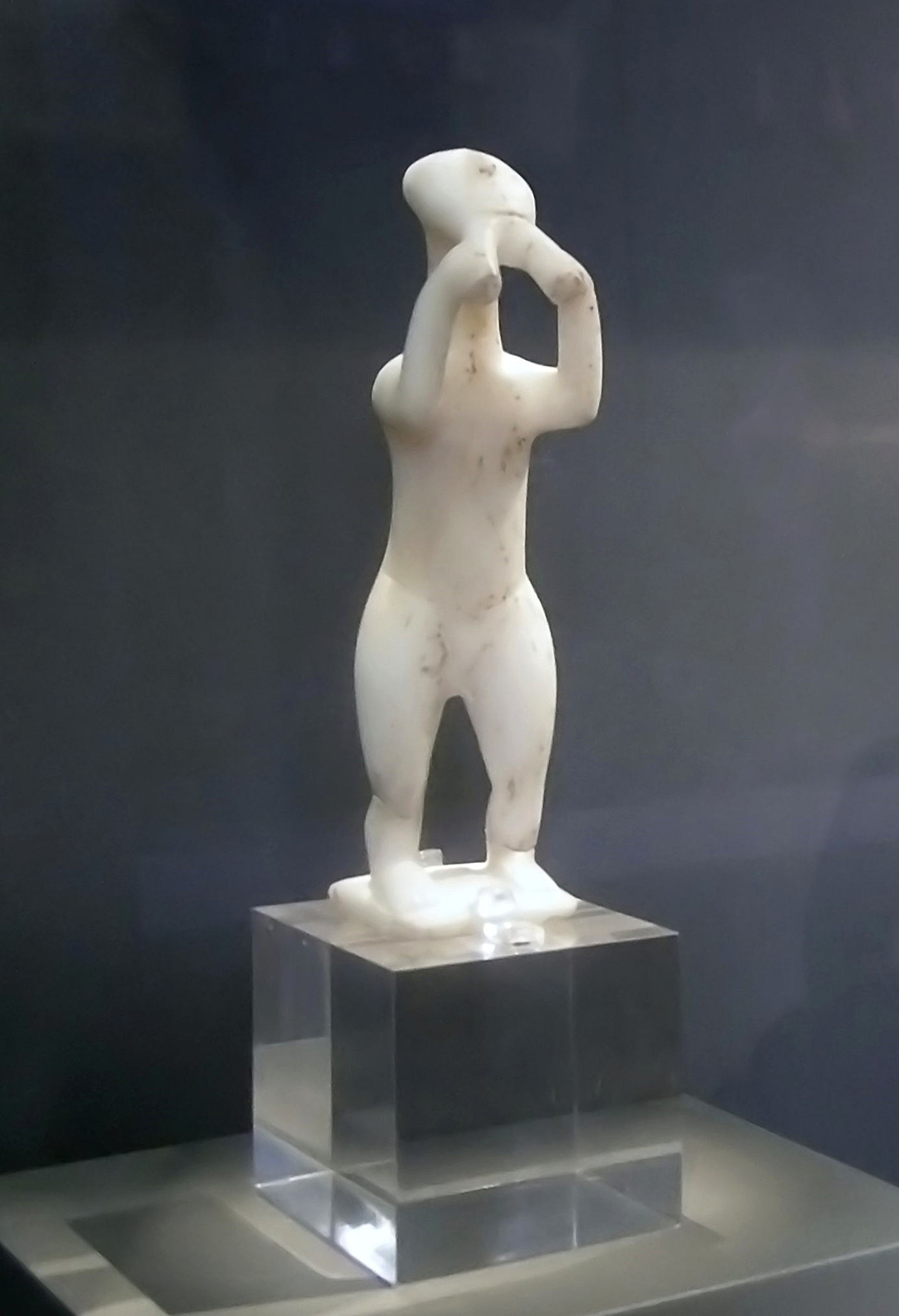
Marble sculpture of an aulos player, Cycladic civilization, c. 2600 BC

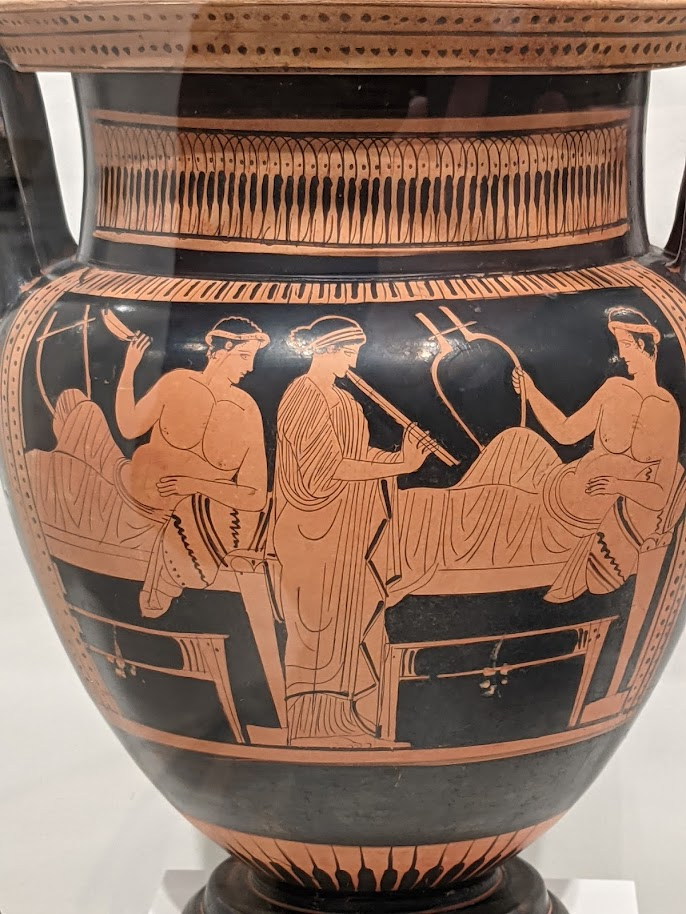
Attic red-figure column-krater attributed to the Hephaistos Painter, dating c. 450 – c. 425 BCE, depicting a hetaira playing the aulos at a symposium for two men holding lyres, Eskenazi Museum of Art

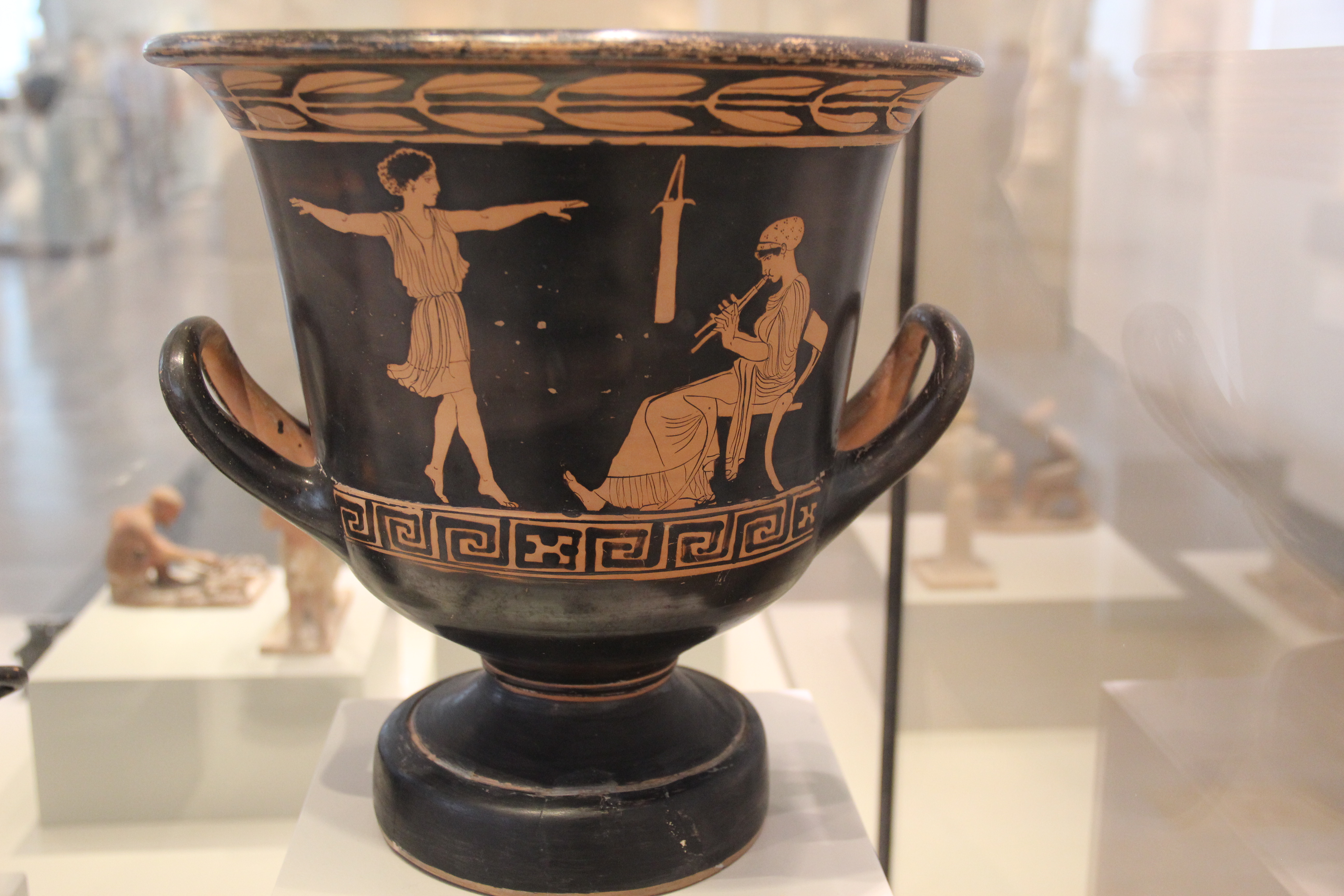
440-430 BC, Greece. Greek Red-figure Ceramic Calyx Crater. Girl dancing to aulos.

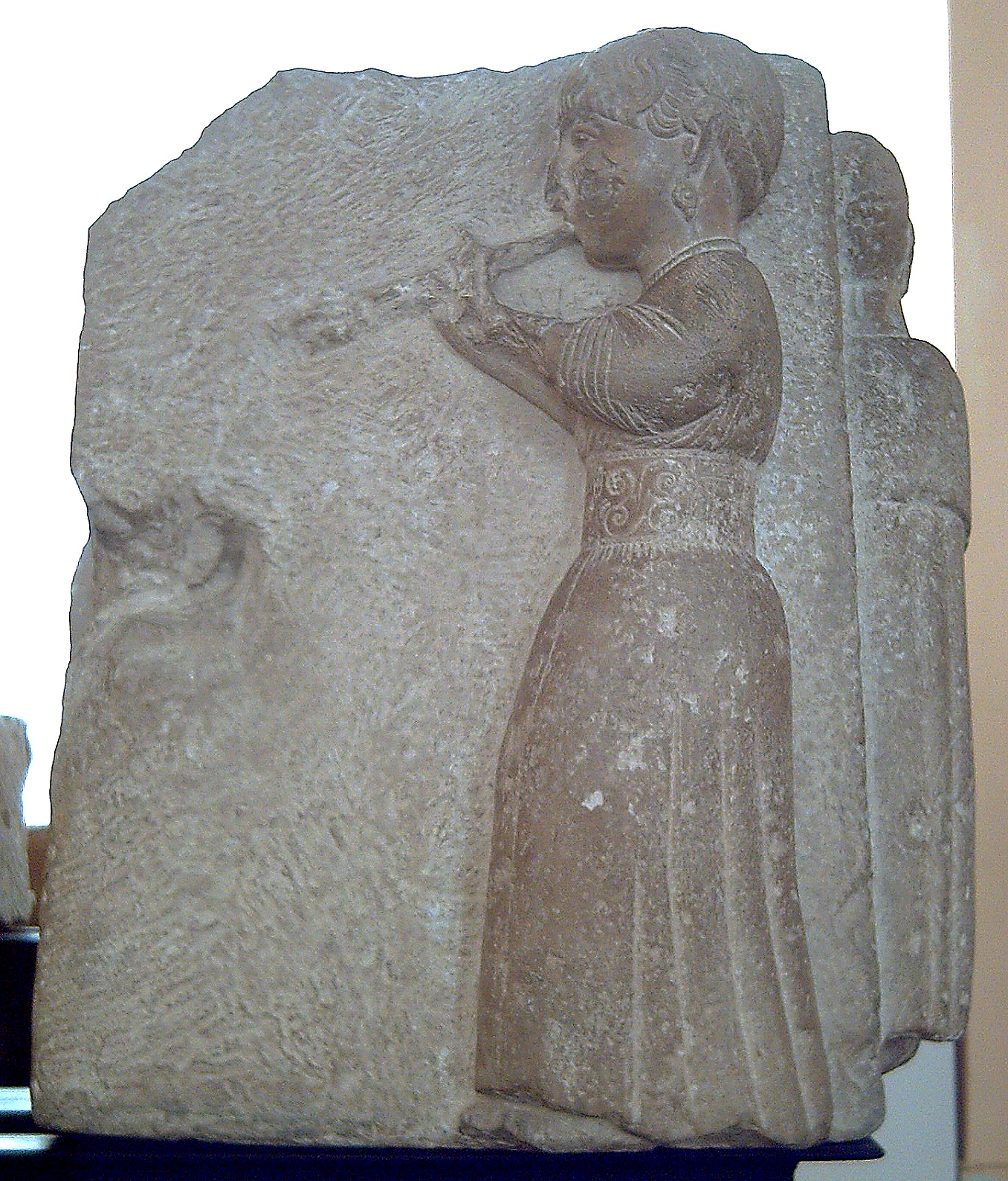
225-175 B.C., Osuna, Greek settlement in Iberian peninsula. Iberian high-relief showing an auletris (woman playing an aulos). It's part of the Sculptures of Osuna.

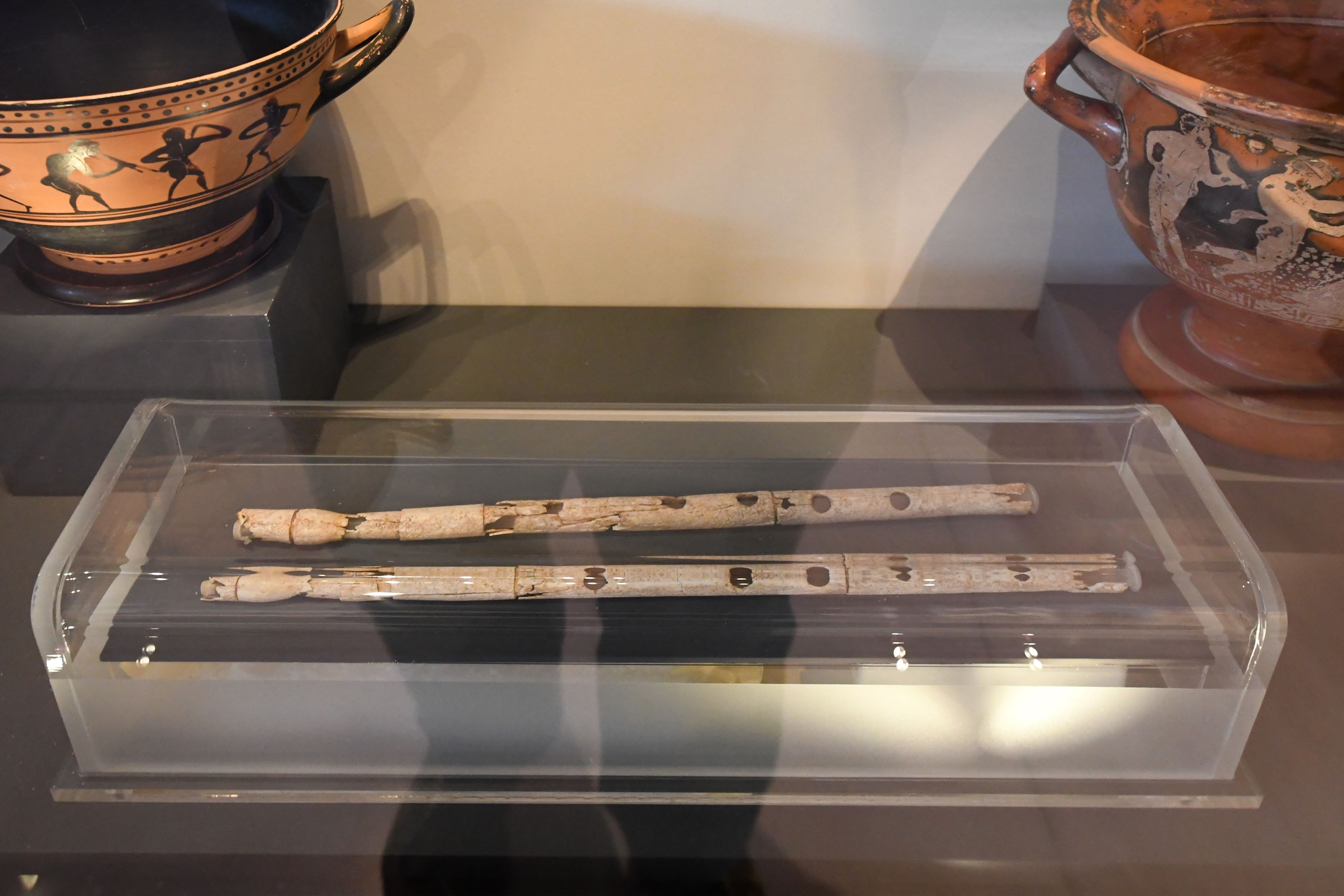
Aulos bodies made of bone. Archäologisches Museum Thessaloniki.

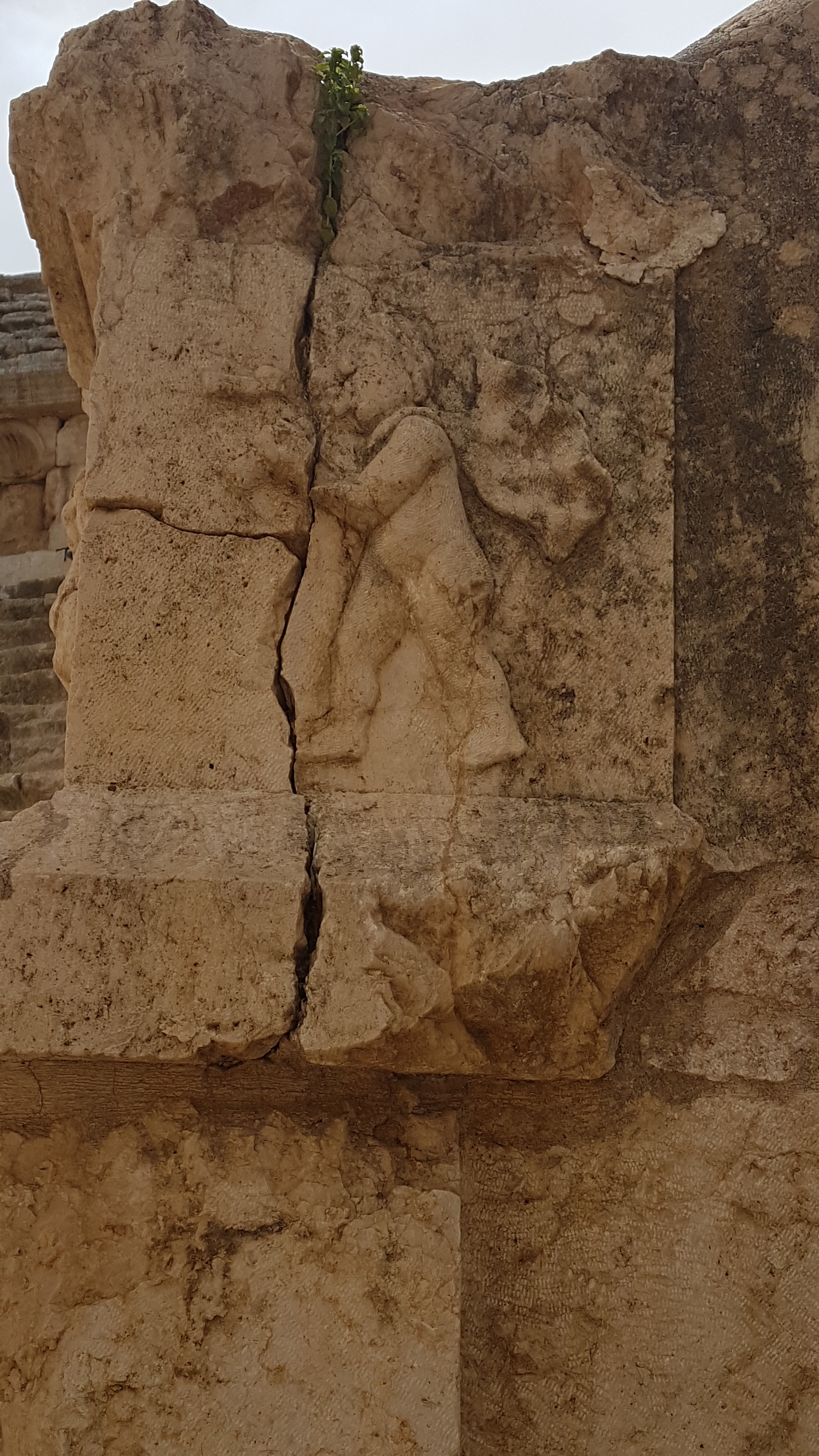
A male figure playing aulos. Southern theatre at Jerash.

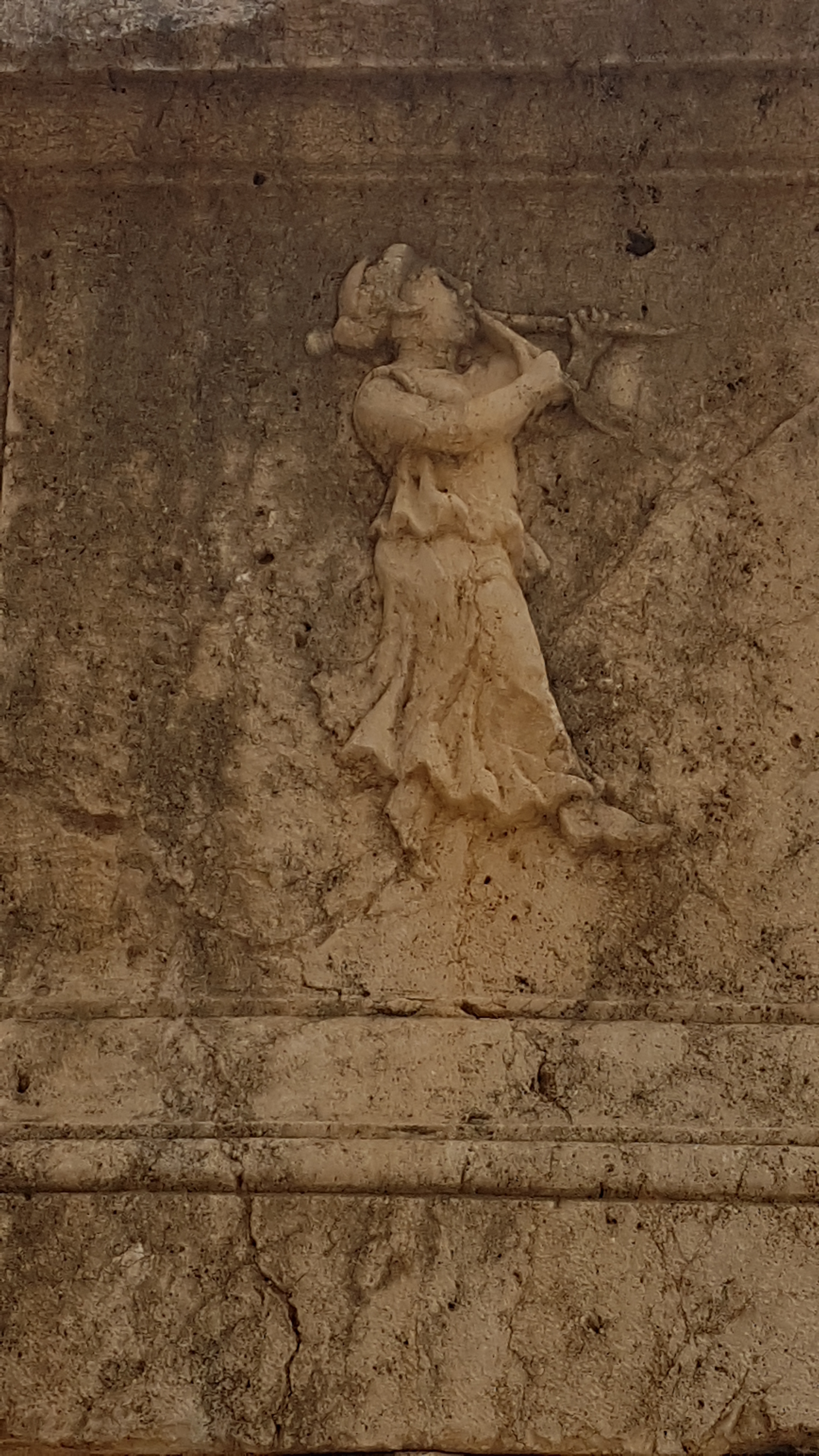
A woman playing aulos. Southern theatre at Jerash.

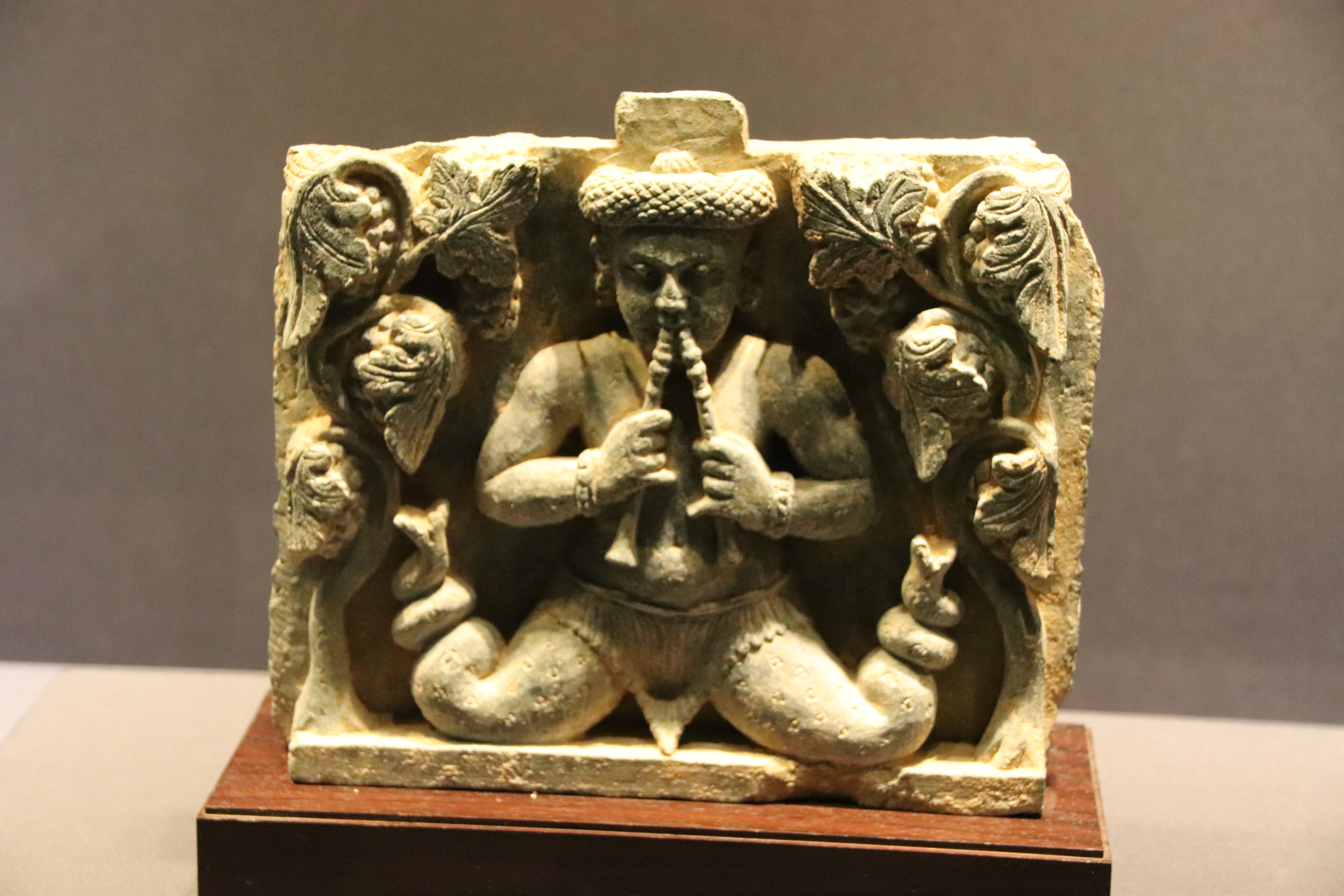
Helenistic depiction of Aulos, from Gandhara, 1st-3rd centuries BCE.

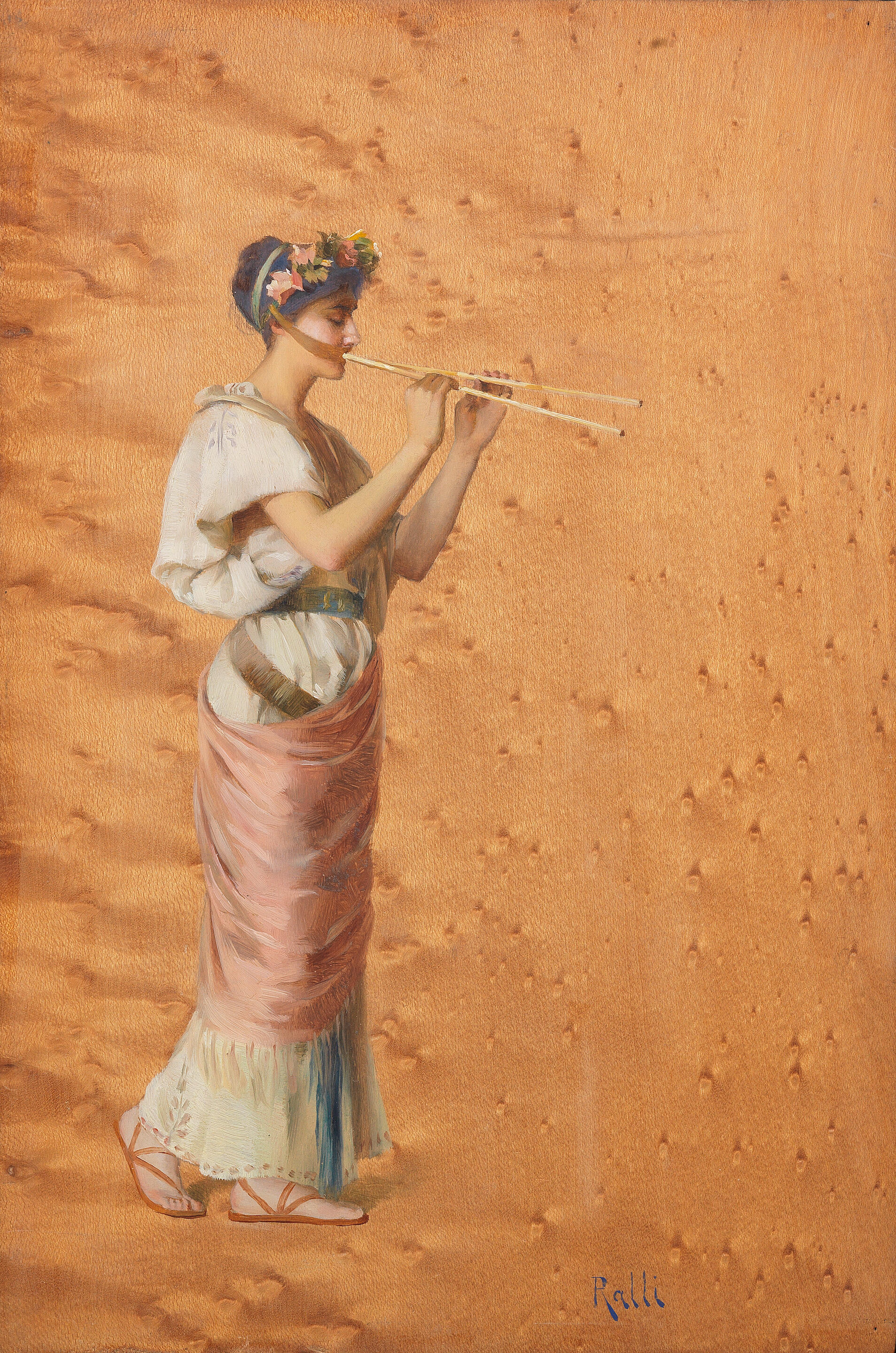
Modern 19th Century depiction by Theodoros Rallis

== See also ==
- The Reading Aulos
- Launeddas
- Zampogna
- Arghul
- Triple pipes
