= Malcolm Willcock =

British classical scholar (1925–2006)

- Born: Malcolm Maurice Willcock; 1 October 1925
- Died: 2 May 2006 (aged 80)

Academic background
- Education: Fettes College, Edinburgh; Pembroke College, Cambridge

Academic work
- Institutions: Pembroke College, Cambridge; Sidney Sussex College, Cambridge; University of Lancaster; University College London
- Military career
- Allegiance: United Kingdom
- Service: Royal Air Force
- Service years: 1944–1947

Malcolm Maurice Willcock (1 October 1925 – 2 May 2006) was a British classical scholar. He specialised in Ancient Greek poetry, particularly the Homeric poems, but also published on other Greek and Latin literature, including the Greek authors Pindar and Xenophon and the Roman poet Virgil. After reading classics at Pembroke College, Cambridge, he undertook National Service in the Royal Air Force before commencing his academic career at Cambridge. He moved to the newly founded University of Lancaster in 1965 as its first professor of classics, before taking up the professorship of Latin at University College London (UCL) in 1980.

Willcock served frequently as an academic administrator, including as senior tutor of Sidney Sussex College, Cambridge; as a college principal and university pro-vice-chancellor at Lancaster; and as vice-provost of UCL. He was a founding member of the Joint Association of Classical Teachers, which promoted the teaching of classics in schools and universities, and developed university courses to allow those without experience in Latin or Greek to study the subject. He developed a series of classical commentaries for the Aris & Phillips publishing house, and declined the presidency of the Virgil Society, since he did not consider himself a scholar of Virgil.

An obituary in The Daily Telegraph called Willcock "one of the finest Homeric scholars of his generation". He argued for the single authorship of the Homeric poems, though analysed them using techniques developed by those seeing the poems as oral compositions by many poets over time. He was credited with reconciling the tradition of "oralist" scholarship on the poems with that of neoanalysis, by which they are seen as coherent artistic unities. A review of his commentary on Pindar called it "traditionally British" in focusing on philological and metrical questions while making little use of art, archaeology or literary theory.

== Biography ==
Malcolm Maurice Willcock was born on 1 October 1925. (Note: The Telegraph, 23 May 2006. For Willcock's middle name, see "Willcock, Malcolm Maurice (1925–2006), Classical Scholar". Trinity College, Cambridge, Archives.) He was educated at Fettes College, a private boarding school in Edinburgh, and read classics at Pembroke College, Cambridge. During his time as an undergraduate he won the Porson Prize, awarded by the university for the best composition of an original verse in Ancient Greek. After completing National Service in the Royal Air Force from 1944 until 1947, during which he worked as an air traffic controller in ground-controlled approach, he returned to Pembroke as a research Fellow from 1951 until 1952. In the latter year, he moved to Sidney Sussex College, Cambridge as a full Fellow. In 1957, he married Sheena Gourlay, with whom he went on to have four daughters.

Willcock became senior tutor at Sidney Sussex in 1962. He was a founding member of the Joint Association of Classical Teachers, an organisation created in 1963 to promote the teaching of classics in schools and universities. In 1965, he was appointed as the first professor of classics at the University of Lancaster, which had been established the previous year. Unusually among the university's staff, he elected to wear his academic gown while lecturing into the 1970s. While at Lancaster, he was responsible for organising programmes which allowed students with no prior experience in Latin or Greek to study classics – then rare in British universities. He served as principal of the university's Bowland College from 1966, and was a pro-vice-chancellor of the university between 1975 and 1979.

Willcock was appointed Professor of Latin at University College London (UCL) in 1980, though his appointment was controversial among the university's management, as he was known primarily for his work on the Ancient Greek poetry attributed to Homer. While at UCL, Willcock taught only Latin for most of his tenure, and was involved in the development of the Ancient World Studies course, which, like the courses he had designed at Lancaster, was open to those without training in the classical languages. He was also involved in the first production, in 1980, of UCL's annual classical play, of the Roman playwright Plautus's comedic Casina (of which he had co-published an edition in 1976). Between 1988 and 1991, he served as vice-provost of UCL.

Willcock was an academic consultant to the publishing house Aris & Phillips from 1979, and developed its series of classical texts and commentaries. He served as treasurer of the Virgil Society, dedicated to the study of the Roman poet Virgil, from 1982 until 2003: Dennis Blandford, the society's archivist, credited him with saving it from extinction. (Note: Proceedings of the Virgil Society 2008, p. 120. On Blandford, see editor's note on Blandford 2017, p. 117.) He presented two papers on Virgil's Aeneid at its meetings, but declined the presidency of the society, since he did not consider himself a Virgilian scholar.

Willcock retired from UCL in 1991, though he continued to publish academic work. He chaired the Virgil Society's first schools' conference for students in September 1993, and was made an honorary vice president of the society in 2003. After receiving a quadruple heart bypass in 2002, Willcock died of a stroke on 2 May 2006.

== Classical scholarship ==
An obituary in The Daily Telegraph later called him "one of the finest Homeric scholars of his generation". He believed in the authorship of the Homeric poems by a single poet, though argued that that poet employed the techniques of oral poetry often used by scholars to argue for multiple authorship. (Note: Willcock 1990, pp. 2, 11, with review at Patterson 2000, p. 28.) He wrote that characters in the Iliad tend to act in consistent ways, which he attributed to a "theme" or "mental mould" constructed by the poet of attributes and actions befitting each character. Anna Stelow, in 2020, described Willcock's approach to Homer as an early illustration that two schools of thought usually opposed to each other, that of oralism (which considers the Homeric poems to have been composed gradually through improvisatory performance) and of neoanalysis (through which the poems are interpreted as coherent poetic wholes), could be mutually compatible.

Erwin Cook, in 2009, considered his arguments on the importance of Book 8 of the Iliad to be based in the oralist position, while Martin West named him in 2003 among the British scholars who had "accepted Neoanalytic thinking with decisiveness". In a 1997 review, Hans van Wees credited him with arguing decisively for the unity of the Iliad with respect to its battle scenes, writing that "centuries worth of ingenuity applied to ridding the 'original' poem of some of those boring old fighting sequences is utterly undone in the space of a mere eight pages ... but he makes it look simple".

Reviewing Willcock's commentary on selected works of the archaic Greek poet Pindar, Malcolm Slater called it "full of good sense and judgement", though also accused Willcock of a "traditionally British" over-emphasis on matters of philology and poetic metre at the expense of comparanda from art, archaeology or epigraphy, and of insights from the field of literary theory.

== Published works ==
- Willcock, Malcolm M. (1964). "Mythological Paradeigmata in the Iliad". The Classical Quarterly. 14 (2): 141–154. JSTOR 637720.
- — (1970). A Commentary on Homer's Iliad: Books I–VI. London: Macmillan. SBN 333-11307-1 – via Internet Archive.
- — (1973). "The Funeral Games of Patroclus". Bulletin of the Institute of Classical Studies. 20: 1–11. JSTOR 43646305.
- — (1976). A Companion to the Iliad, Based on the Translation by Richard Lattimore. University of Chicago Press. ISBN 0-226-89854-7 – via Internet Archive.
- Willcock, Malcolm M.; MacCary, W. T., eds. (1976). Plautus: Casina. Cambridge Greek and Latin Classics. Cambridge University Press. ISBN 0-521-21041-0.
- Willcock, Malcolm M. (1983). "Battle Scenes in the Aeneid". Proceedings of the Cambridge Philological Society. 29 (209): 87–99. JSTOR 44696898.
- — (1983). "Antilochus in the Iliad". In Delebecque, Édouard (ed.). Mélanges Édouard Delebecque. Aix-en-Provence: Université de Provence. pp. 477–485. ISBN 2-85399-076-1.
- — (1983). "Homer Today". In Winnifrith, Tom; Murray, Penelope (eds.). Greece Old and New. London: Palgrave Macmillan. pp. 25–38. ISBN 0-333-27836-4.
- — (1988) [1987]. "Homer's Chariot Race and Virgil's Boat Race" (PDF). Proceedings of the Virgil Society. 19: 1–14.
- — (1990). "The Search for the Poet Homer". Greece & Rome. 37 (1): 1–13. JSTOR 643238.
- —, ed. (1991). Plautus: Pseudolus. Bristol Classical Press. ISBN 0-86292-089-2.
- — (1995). "The Importance of Iliad 8". In Andersen, Øivind; Dickie, Matthew (eds.). Homer's World: Fiction, Tradition, Reality. Papers From the Norwegian Institute at Athens. Vol. 3. Jonsered: Norwegian Institute at Athens. pp. 113–121.
- —, ed. (1995). Pindar: Victory Odes. Cambridge Greek and Latin Classics. Cambridge University Press. ISBN 0-521-43636-2.
- — (1997). "Neoanalysis". In Morris, Ian; Powell, Barry B. (eds.). A New Companion to Homer. Mnemosyne, Supplements. Vol. 163. Leiden: Brill. pp. 174–189. ISBN 90-04-20608-6.
- —, ed. (1996). Cicero: Letters of January to April 43 BC. Aris & Phillips Classical Texts. Warminster: Aris & Phillips. ISBN 0-85668-632-8.
- —, ed. (1998). Homer: Iliad I–XII. Bristol Classical Press. ISBN 1-85399-507-X.
- —, ed. (1999). Homer: Iliad XIII–XXIV. Bristol Classical Press. ISBN 1-85399-595-9.
- —, ed. (1999). Xenophon and Arrian on Hunting. Aris & Phillips Classical Texts. Warminster: Aris & Phillips. ISBN 0-85668-706-5. JSTOR jj.38238748.
- — (2002). "A New Commentary on the Iliad". The Classical Review. 52 (2): 229–231. doi:10.1093/cr/52.2.229.
- Albracht, Frantz (2004) [1886–1895]. Battle and Battle Description in Homer: A Contribution to the History of War. Edited and translated by Jones, Peter; Wright, Gabriele; and Willcock, Malcolm. Bristol Classical Press. ISBN 0-7156-3241-8.

== Works cited ==
- Blandford, Dennis W. (2017). Hadas, Daniel (ed.). "The Virgil Society from 1993 to the Present" (PDF). Proceedings of the Virgil Society. 29: 187–217.
- Cook, Erwin F. (2008). "On the 'Importance' of Iliad 8". Classical Philology. 104 (2): 133–161. JSTOR 10.1086/605340.
- Minchin, Elizabeth (2011). "'Themes' and 'Mental Moulds': Roger Schank, Malcolm Willcock and the Creation of Character in Homer". The Classical Quarterly. New Series. 61 (2): 323–343. JSTOR 41301540.
- Patterson, Eoin (2000). "Review: Homer (Greece and Rome Studies)". JACT Review: 28.
- "Professor Malcolm Willcock". The Telegraph. 23 May 2006.
- "Professor Malcolm Willcock". The Times. 16 June 2006.
- R. G. M. (2008). "Malcolm Willcock" (PDF). Proceedings of the Virgil Society. 26: 120.
- Slater, William (3 February 1996). "Review: Willcock, 'Pindar: Victory Odes'". Bryn Mawr Classical Review.
- Stelow, Anna R. (2020). Menelaus in the Archaic Period: Not Quite the Best of the Achaeans. Oxford University Press. doi:10.1093/oso/9780199685929.001. ISBN 978-0-19-968592-9.
- Van Wees, Hans (1997). "Review: Homer's World: Fiction, Tradition, Reality, by Ǿ. Andersen, M. Dickie". The Journal of Hellenic Studies. 117: 216–217. JSTOR 632567.
- West, Martin L. (2003). "Iliad and Aethiopis". The Classical Quarterly. New Series. 53 (1): 1–14. JSTOR 3556478.
