= Etruscan amphora showing Troilos =

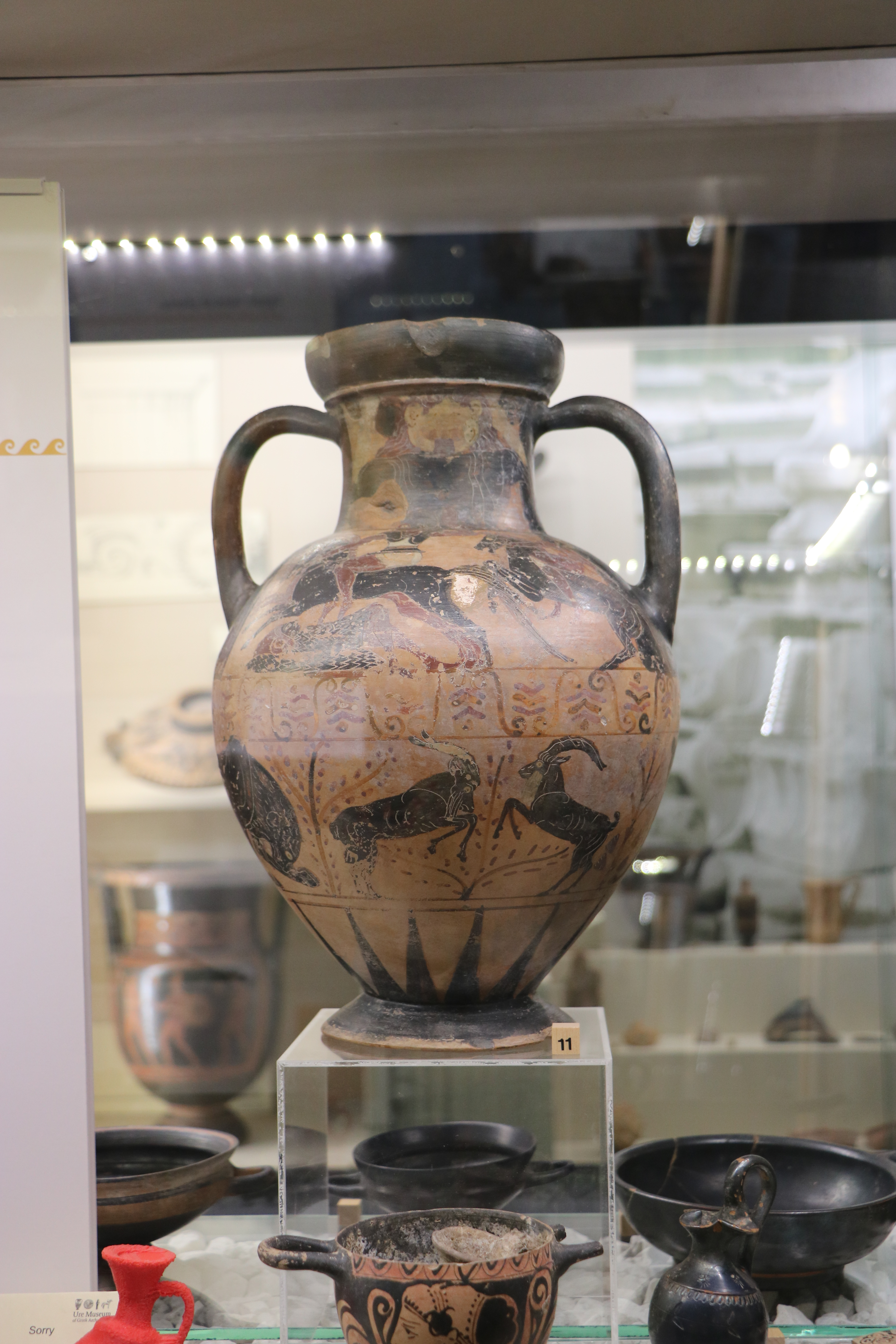
Side of the Achilles' attack on Troilos

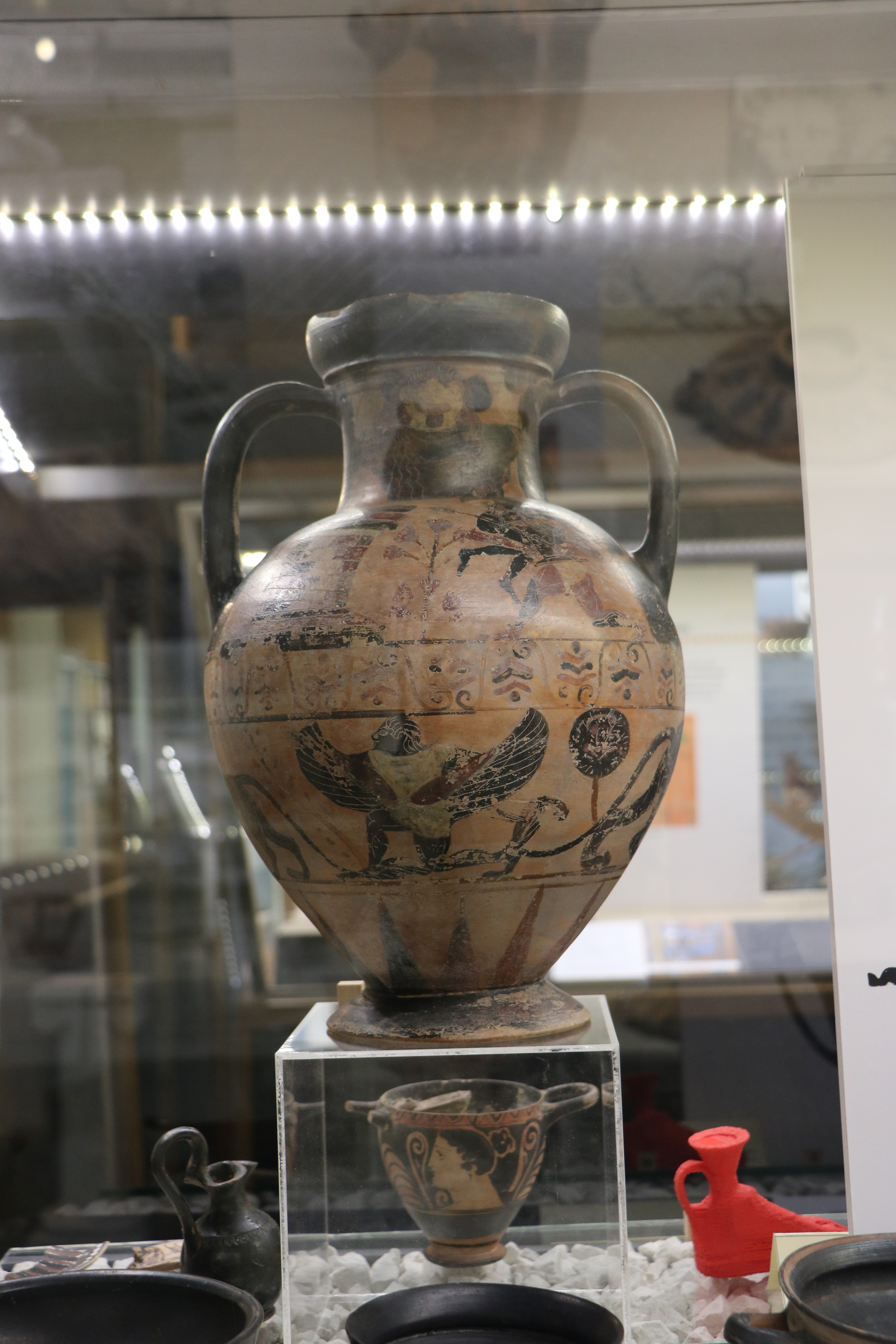
Side of Achilles' carrying of Troilos

The Ure Museum's Etruscan amphora showing Troilos is a mid to late 6th century black-figure terracotta amphora of the 'Pontic' type attributed to the Tityos Painter. The main decoration is a depiction of the ambush of the Trojan Troilos by the Greek hero Achilles.

== Decoration ==
Both sides of the neck of the amphora feature demi-Gorgons. The upper half of the main body depicts the ambush of the Trojan prince Troilos by the Greek hero Achilles, with the two sides depicting differing scenes of the event.

One side has Achilles seizing Troilos outside the well-house, or, as Professor Percy Ure suggested, carrying him to the shrine. Achilles is shown fully armoured – with ornate crested helmet, cuirass and greaves – while Troilos appears almost completely undressed.

The other side has two riders and an unmounted horse passing a fallen man. The lead rider next to the unmanned horse and above the fallen man is shown armoured with helmet and cuirass; the second rider and fallen man are clothed in a Thracian style, with soft caps and patterned cloaks. Ure believed this to be an illustration of Achilles's attack on Troilos, with the following rider coming to Troilos's aid.

It has been suggested that the changes to the normal Greek telling of the story, for example the lack of a depiction of Polyxena, by the Etruscan decorator may be a muddling of the tale as it travelled to Etruria or even a deliberate change to better suit local tastes.

The lower half of the amphora is decorated with wild animals: two male goats on their hind legs (as if rutting), two lions (one licking its paw) and a winged humanoid.

The middle of the amphora features a band of palmettes, and the base a simple geometric triangle pattern.

Both Ure and Professor Brian A. Sparkes noted that it is the rarity of the amphora opposed to its quality that marks it as an important example of the 'Pontic' type.

== Acquisition ==
Ure acquired the amphora for the museum, then the Museum of Greek Archaeology, at auction in London in 1947. Then, as now, very little was known of the amphora's provenance. It is thought to originate from the Etruscan city of Vulci, north-west of Rome – Ure noted that the scene of Achilles' ambush of Troilos was a popular one for decorating tombs in the area. A poorly written description in the auction catalogue enabled Ure, after seeking advice from Sir John Beazley, to acquire it at a relatively economic price.

== Current display ==
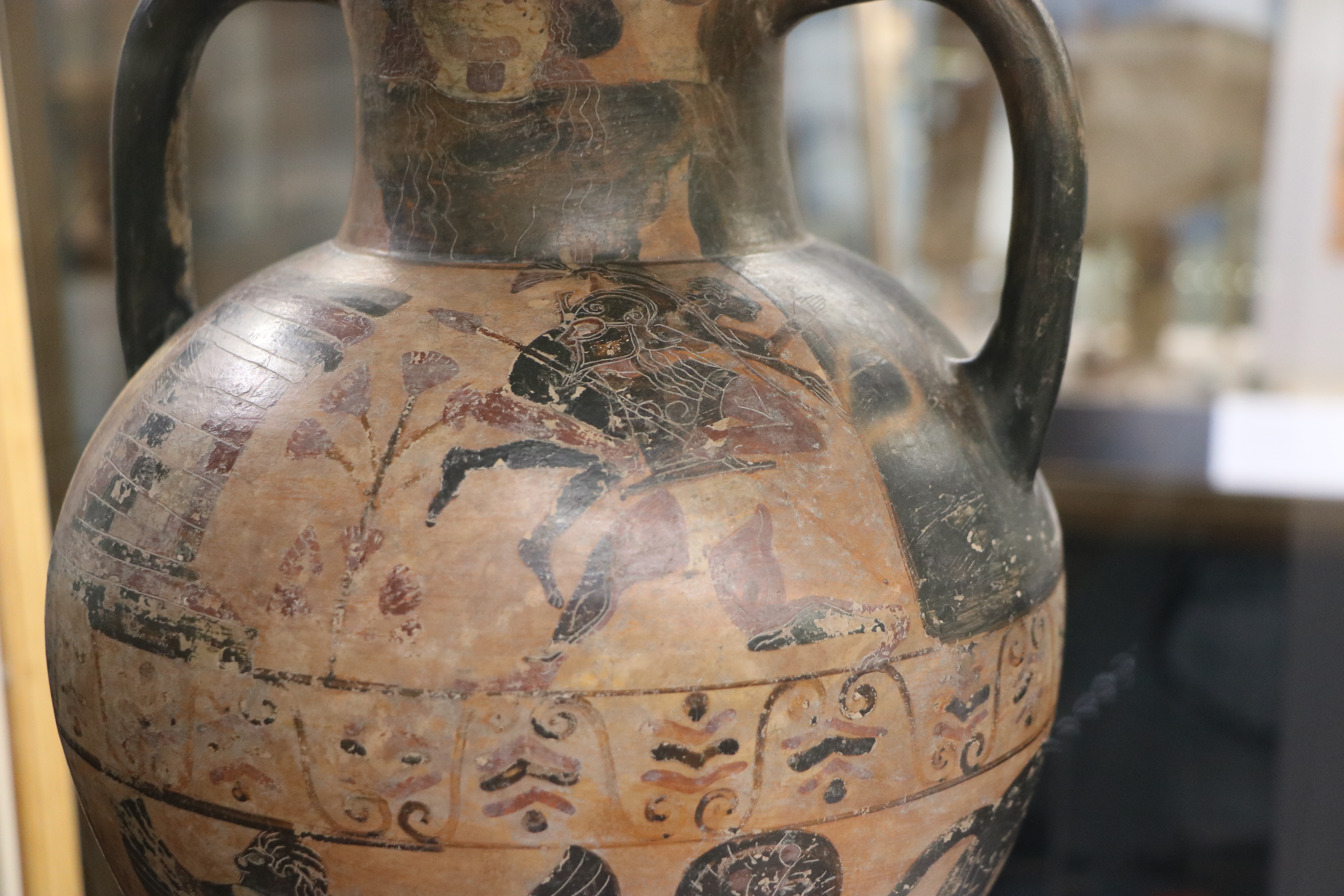
Detail of Achilles carrying Troilos

The amphora is now on permanent display at the Ure Museum. It is one of the more prominent items in the museum's large collection, and is a popular attraction for both scholars and members of the general public.
