= August Pauly =

German classical scholar (1796–1845)

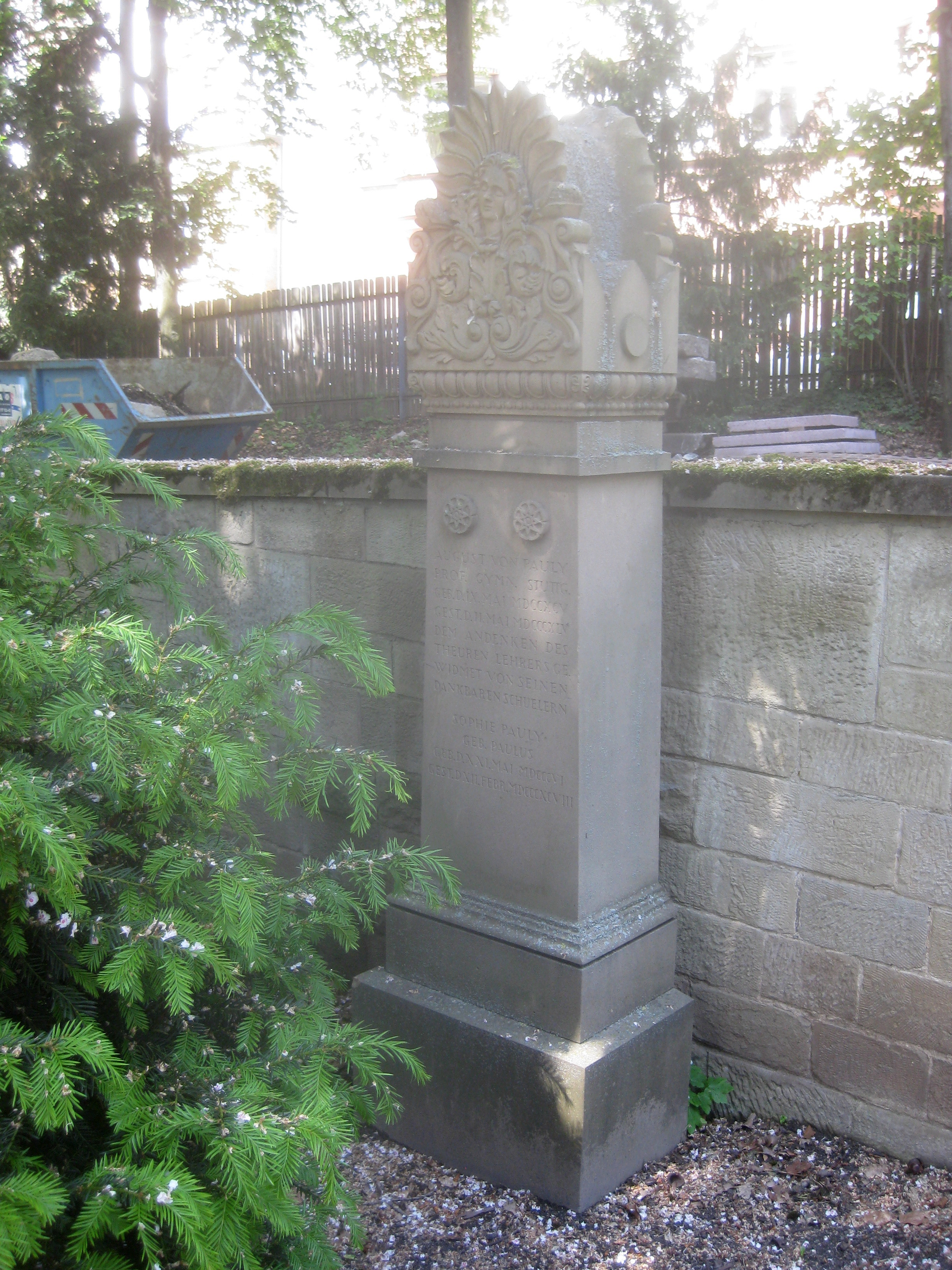
- Gravesite of Pauly at the Fangelsbachfriedhof
- Born: August Friedrich Pauly; 9 May 1796; Benningen am Neckar
- Died: 2 May 1845 (aged 48); Stuttgart
- Other name: August Friedrich von Pauly
- Occupations: Educator, classical philologist

Academic background
- Education: Tübinger Stift

August Friedrich von Pauly (/ˈpɔːli/; German: [ˈpaʊli]; 9 May 1796 – 2 May 1845) was a German educator and classical philologist.

From 1813 to 1818 he studied at the Tübinger Stift, then furthered his education at Heidelberg as a student of Georg Friedrich Creuzer. Beginning in 1822, he served as rector of the Latin school in Biberach, followed by work as a gymnasium professor in Heilbronn (1828). From 1830 until his death in 1845, he was an educator at the gymnasium in Stuttgart.

In 1837 began the first edition of the classical encyclopedia Realencyclopädie der classischen Altertumswissenschaft, whose later editions are commonly known as the Pauly–Wissowa. Pauly died prior to publication of the fourth volume of the initial edition. After his death, Ernst Christian Walz and Wilhelm Siegmund Teuffel continued to edit the encyclopedia (first edition 1837–1852, six volumes). He also published an edition involving the works of the Greek satirist Lucian of Samosata called Lucians Werke (1827–1832).
