= 1st millennium BC in music =

2nd millennium BC in music - 1st millennium BC in music - 1st millennium in music

== Events ==
- 586 BC – Sakadas of Argos wins the prize for aulos playing at the Pythian Games, the first of three times. His aulos nomoi, especially one portraying the victorious combat of Apollo with the Python, remained popular for over two hundred years (Anderson and Mathiesen 2001).
- 405 BC – Aristophanes, in The Frogs, defends Aeschylus' treatment of poetry and music against the brilliance of Euripides, whom he criticizes for many musical transgressions, and charges Socrates with having advocated the destruction of the musical and literary traditions of tragedy (Anderson, Mathiesen, and Anderson 2001a).

== Classical music ==
- 138 or 128 BC - Athenios son of Athenios composes the First Delphic Hymn (Bélis 1992, 48–49 and 53–54; Pöhlmann and West 2001, 71).
- 128 BC - Limenios, son of Thoinos composes a "Paean and Prosodion to the God" (i.e., Apollo), today called the Second Delphic Hymn (Pöhlmann and West 2001, 71).
- between 200 BC and 100 AD – the Seikilos epitaph, "Hoson zēs, phainou", inscribed on a stone funerary monument

== Musical theatre ==
- 408 BC – Euripides – Orestes (one of the earliest surviving fragments of ancient Greek music is from this play)
- 409 BC – Euripides – Iphigenia in Aulis

== Births ==
- ca. 485 BC – Euripides
- ca. 375–360 BC – Aristoxenos of Tarentum
- 2nd century BC – Athenios, son of Athenios
- 2nd century BC – Limenios, son of Thoinos

== Deaths ==
- ca. 406 BC – Euripides
- ca. 300 BC – Aristoxenos of Tarentum
- 2nd or early 1st century BC – Athenios son of Athenios
- 2nd or early 1st century BC – Limenios, son of Thoinos

== See also ==
- Timeline of musical events

== Sources ==
- Anderson, Warren, and Thomas J. Mathiesen. 2001. "Sacadas [Sakadas] of Argos". The New Grove Dictionary of Music and Musicians, edited by Stanley Sadie and John Tyrrell. London: Macmillan Publishers.
- Anderson, Warren, Thomas J. Mathiesen, and Robert Anderson. 2001a. "Aristophanes". The New Grove Dictionary of Music and Musicians, edited by Stanley Sadie and John Tyrrell. London: Macmillan Publishers.
- Anderson, Warren, Thomas J. Mathiesen, and Robert Anderson. 2001b. "Euripides". The New Grove Dictionary of Music and Musicians, edited by Stanley Sadie and John Tyrrell. London: Macmillan Publishers.
- Bélis, Annie (ed.). 1992. Corpus des inscriptions de Delphes, vol. 3: "Les Hymnes à Apollon". Paris: De Boccard. ISBN 2-86958-051-7
- Pöhlmann, Egert, and Martin L. West. 2001. Documents of Ancient Greek Music: The Extant Melodies and Fragments, edited and transcribed with commentary by Egert Pöhlmann and Martin L. West. Oxford: Clarendon Press. ISBN 0-19-815223-X
