= Music of ancient Greece =

Musical traditions of ancient Greece

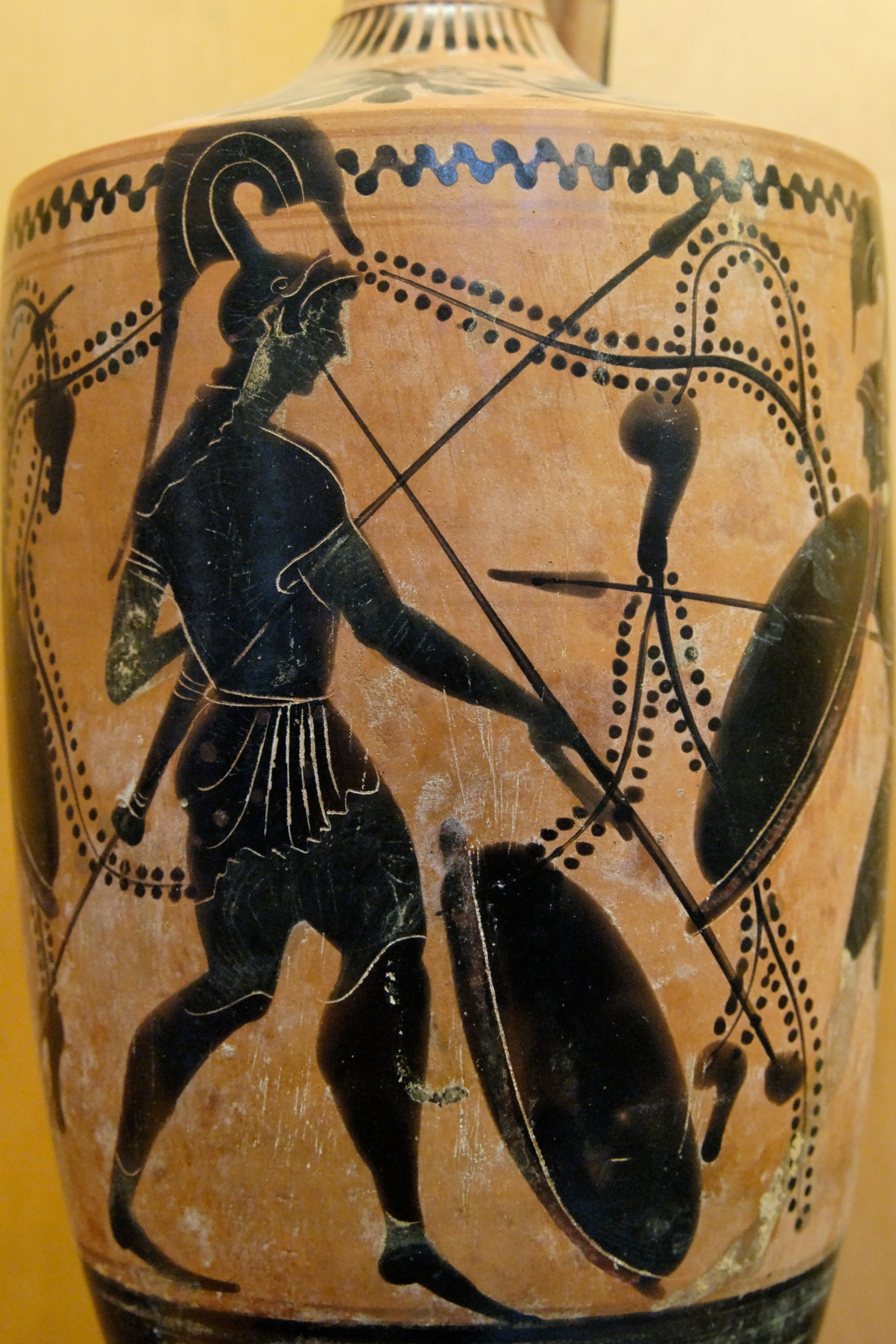
Ancient Greek warrior playing the salpinx, late 6th–early 5th century BC, Attic black-figure (lekythos)

Music was almost universally present in ancient Greek society, from marriages, funerals, and religious ceremonies to theatre, folk music, and the ballad-like reciting of epic poetry. This played an integral role in the lives of ancient Greeks. There are some fragments of actual Greek musical notation, many literary references, depictions on ceramics and relevant archaeological remains, such that some things can be known—or reasonably surmised—about what the music sounded like, the general role of music in society, the economics of music, the importance of a professional caste of musicians, etc.

The word music comes from the Muses, the daughters of Zeus and patron goddesses of creative and intellectual endeavours.

Concerning the origin of music and musical instruments: the history of music in ancient Greece is so closely interwoven with Greek mythology and legend that it is often difficult to surmise what is historically true and what is myth. The music and music theory of ancient Greece laid the foundation for western music and western music theory, as it would go on to influence the ancient Romans, the early Christian church and the medieval composers. Our understanding of ancient Greek music theory, musical systems, and musical ethos comes almost entirely from the surviving teachings of the Pythagoreans, Plato, Aristoxenus, Philodemus, Ptolemy, and Aristides.

Some ancient Greek philosophers discussed the study of music in ancient Greece. Pythagoras in particular believed that music was subject to the same mathematical laws of harmony as the mechanics of the cosmos, evolving into an idea known as the music of the spheres. The Pythagoreans focused on the mathematics and the acoustical science of sound and music. They developed tuning systems and harmonic principles that focused on simple integers and ratios, laying a foundation for acoustic science. It can be demonstrated that all surviving music written in ancient instrumental notation can be played with pure intervals of this type. Aristoxenus, who wrote several musicological treatises, was one of multiple theorists who studied music connecting theory and empiricism. Aristoxenus believed that intervals should be both judged by ear and described with mathematical ratios; he was influenced by Pythagoras and used mathematical terminology and measurements in his research. However, playful engagement with musical intervals is documented in music written in vocal notation, which goes beyond the limitations of harmonics.

== Music in society and religion ==
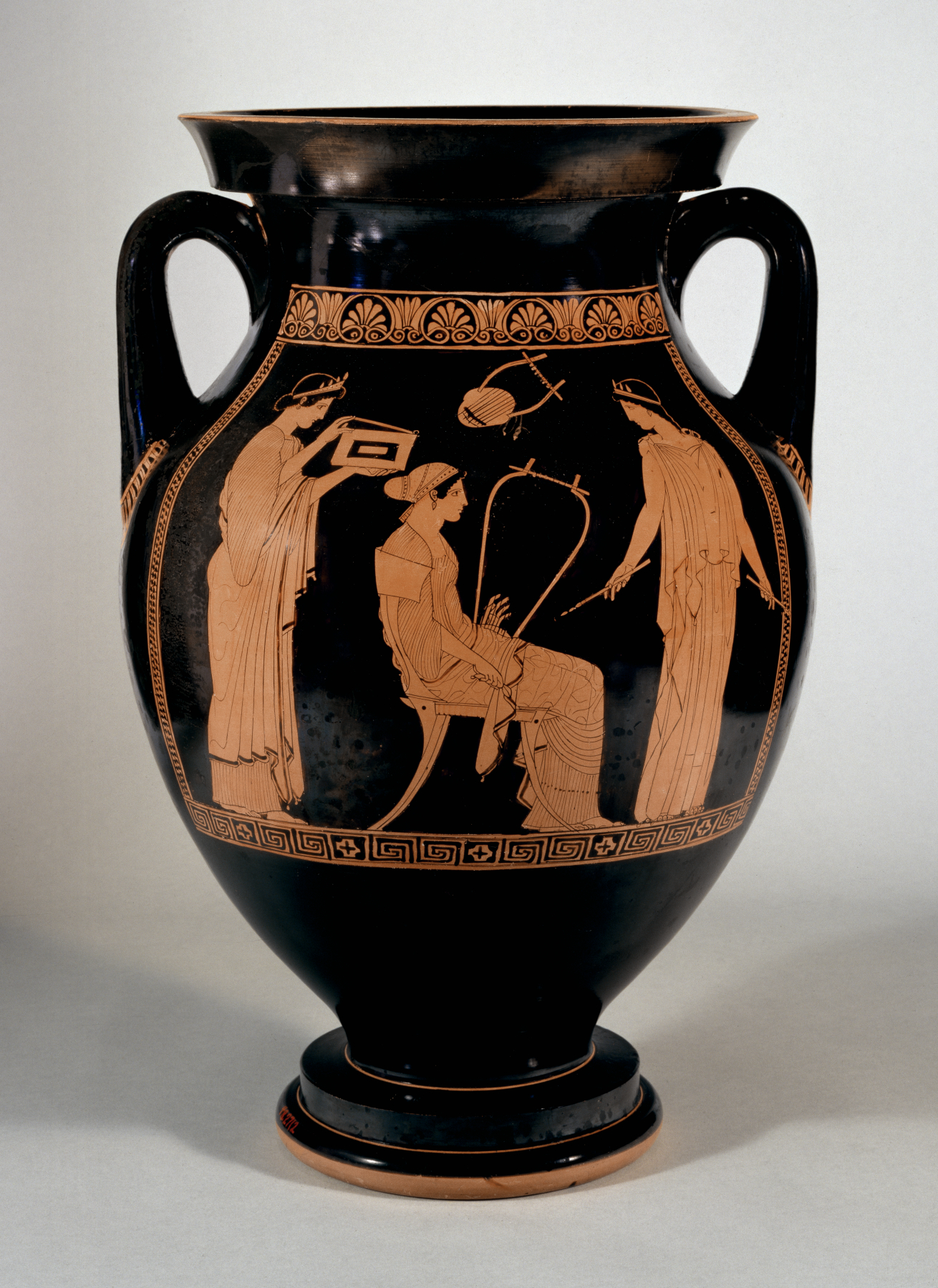
Musical scene with three women painted by the Niobid painter. Side A of a red-figure amphora, Walters Art Museum

Music played an integral role in ancient Greek society. Damon said, according to Plato in the Republic, "when fundamental modes of music change, the fundamental modes of the state change with them." Music and gymnastics comprised the main divisions in one's schooling. "The word 'music' expressed the entire education".

Instrumental music served a religious and entertaining role in ancient Greece as it would often accompany religious events, rituals, and festivals. Music was also used for entertainment when it accompanied drinking-parties or symposia. A popular type of piece to be played while drinking at these drinking parties was the skolion, a piece composed to be heard while drinking. Before and after the Greek drinking parties, religious libations, or the religious act of partaking and pouring out drink, would be made to deities, usually the Olympic gods, the heroes, and Zeus. The offering of libations were often accompanied by a special libation melody called the spondeion, which was often accompanied by an aulos player.

Music occupied an important role in the Greek sacrificial ceremonies. The Hagia Triada Sarcophagus shows that the aulos was present during sacrifices as early as 1300 BC. Music was also present during times of initiation, worship, and religious celebration, playing very integral parts of the sacrificial cults of Apollo and Dionysus.

Music (along with intoxication of potions, fasting, and honey) was also integral in preparing for and catalysing divination, as music would often induce prophets into religious ecstasy and revelation, so much so that the expression for "making music" and "prophesying" were identical in ancient Greek.

Instruments were also present in wartime, though it may not have been considered music entirely. Specific notes of the trumpet were played to dictate commands to soldiers on the battlefield. The aulos and percussion instruments also accompanied the verbal commands given to oarsmen by the boatswain. The instruments were used mainly to help keep the oarsmen in time with one another.

=== Popular song types ===
- Hymn

A hymn is a metric composition whose text addresses a god, either directly or indirectly. They are the earliest formal type in Greek music, and survive in relatively large numbers.

- Paean

Paeans were most commonly sung in honor or worship of Apollo as well as Athena. They usually solemnly expressed the hope for deliverance from a peril, or were sung in thanksgiving after a victory or escape.

- Prosodion

A type of hymn or processional that invoked or praised a god. Prosodions were usually sung on the road to an altar or shrine, before or after a paean.

- Hyporchema

Hyporchema was a dance-song with a marked rhythmic movement, commonly associated with the paean, and often difficult to distinguish from it. For example, the First Delphic Hymn is titled "Paean or Hyporchema".

- Dithyrambs

Usually merrily sung in celebration at festivals, performed especially in dedication to Dionysus, the god of wine. Dithyrambs featured choirs (choros) of men and boys who were accompanied by an aulos player.

=== Poetry and drama ===
Whether or not long narrative poetry, or epic poetry like those of Homer, was sung is not entirely known. As in Plato's dialogue Ion, Socrates uses both the words "sing" and "speak" in connection with the Homeric epics, however there are heavy implications that they have been at least recited unaccompanied by instruments, in a sing-song chant.

Music was also present in ancient Greek lyric poetry, which by definition is poetry or a song accompanied by a lyre. Lyric poetry eventually branched into two paths, monodic lyric which were performed by a singular person, and choral lyric which were sung and sometimes danced by a group of people choros. Famous lyric poets include Alkaios and Sappho from the Island of Lesbos, Sappho being one of the few women whose poetry has been preserved.

Music was also heavily prevalent in ancient Greek Drama. In his Poetics, Aristotle links the origins of tragic drama to dithyrambs. The leaders of dithyrambs were the ones who led the song and dance moves, which would then be responded to by the group. Aristotle implies that this relationship between a single person and a group began the tragic drama, which in its earliest stages had a single actor who played all the parts through either song or speech. The single actor engaged in dialogue with the choros. The choros narrated most of the story through song and dance. In ancient Greece, the playwright was expected to not only write the script but also expected to compose the music and dance moves.

=== Mythology ===
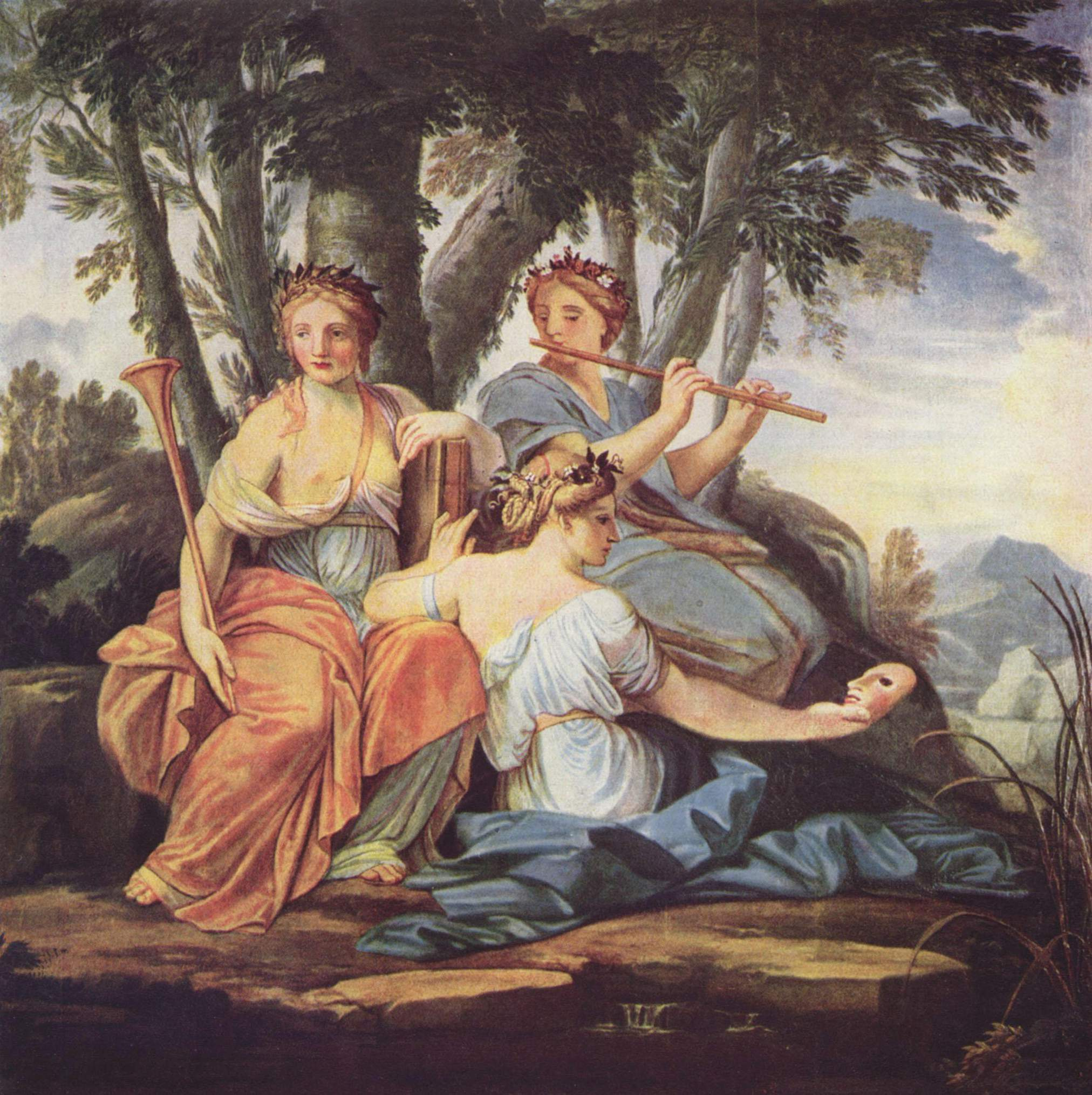
A 17th-century representation of the Greek muses Clio, Thalia, and Euterpe playing a transverse flute, presumably the Greek photinx.

The ancient Greek myths were never codified or documented into one form; what exists are several different versions from several different authors, across multiple centuries, which can lead to variations and even contradictions among authors and even the same author. According to Greek mythology, music, instruments, and the aural arts are attributed to divine origin, and the art of music was gift of the gods to men.

Although Apollo was prominently considered the god of music and harmony, several legendary gods and demigods were purported to have created some aspect of music as well as contributed to its development. Some gods, and especially the Muses, represented specific aspects or elements of music. The 'inventions' or 'findings' of all ancient Greek instruments were accredited to the gods as well. The performance of music was integrated into many different modes of Greek story-telling and art related to mythology, including drama, and poetry, and there are a large number of ancient Greek myths related to music and musicians.

In Greek mythology: Amphion learned music from Hermes and then with a golden lyre built Thebes by moving the stones into place with the sound of his playing; Orpheus, the master-musician and lyre-player, played so magically that he could soothe wild beasts; the Orphic creation myths have Rhea "playing on a brazen drum, and compelling man's attention to the oracles of the goddess"; or Hermes [showing to Apollo] "... his newly-invented tortoise-shell lyre and [playing] such a ravishing tune on it with the plectrum he had also invented, at the same time singing to praise Apollo's nobility that he was forgiven at once ..."; or Apollo's musical victories over Marsyas and Pan.

There are many such references that indicate that music was an integral part of the Greek perception of how their race had even come into existence and how their destinies continued to be watched over and controlled by the Gods. It is no wonder, then, that music was omnipresent at the Pythian Games, the Olympic Games, religious ceremonies, leisure activities, and even the beginnings of drama as an outgrowth of the dithyrambs performed in honor of Dionysus.

It may be that the actual sounds of the music heard at rituals, games, dramas, etc. underwent a change after the traumatic fall of Athens in 404 BC at the end of the first Peloponnesian War. Indeed, one reads of the "revolution" in Greek culture, and Plato's lament that the new music "... used high musical talent, showmanship and virtuosity ... consciously rejecting educated standards of judgement." Although instrumental virtuosity was prized, this complaint included excessive attention to instrumental music such as to interfere with accompanying the human voice, and the falling away from the traditional ethos in music.

==== Mythical origins ====
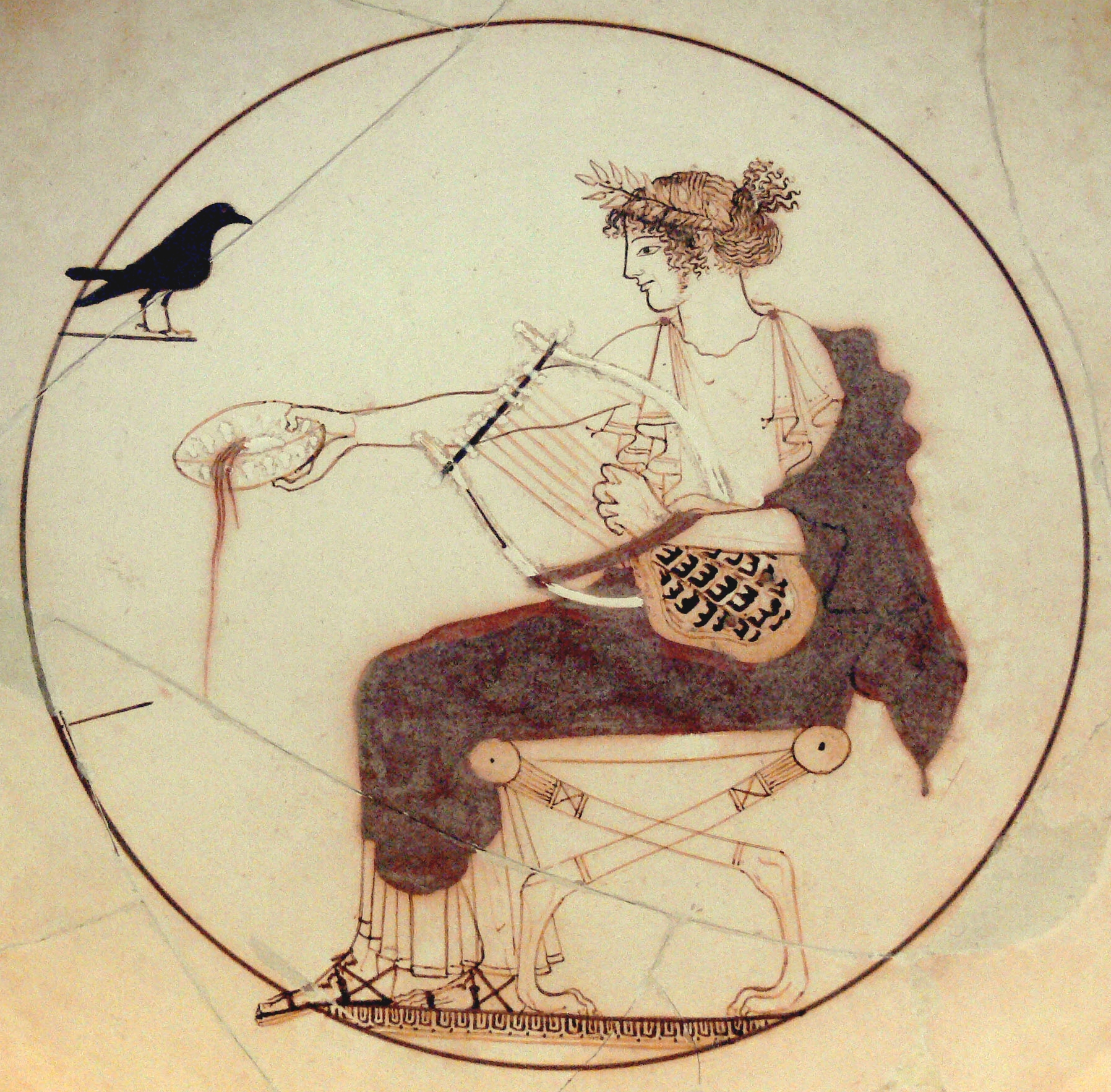
The Cylix of Apollo with the tortoise-shell (chelys) lyre, on a 5th century BC drinking cup (kylix)

- Lyre

According to the Homeric Hymn to Hermes, after stealing his brother Apollo's sacred cattle, Hermes was inspired to build an instrument out of a tortoise shell; he attached horns, and gut-string, to the shell and invented the first lyre. Afterwards, Hermes gave his lyre to Apollo, who took interest in the instrument, in repayment for the stolen cattle. In other accounts, Hermes gave his newly invented lyre to Amphion, a son of Zeus and a skilled musician.

- Aulos

According to Pindar's Twelfth Pythian Ode, after Perseus beheaded Medusa, Athena 'found' or 'invented' the aulos in order to reproduce the lamentation of Medusa's sisters. Since the same Greek word is used for 'find' and 'invent', it is unclear; however, the writer Telestes in the 5th century states that Athena found the instrument in a thicket. In Plutarch's essay On the Restraint of Anger, he writes that Athena, after seeing her reflection while playing the aulos, threw the instrument away because it distorted her facial features when played, after which Marsyas a satyr, picked up her aulos and took it up as his own.

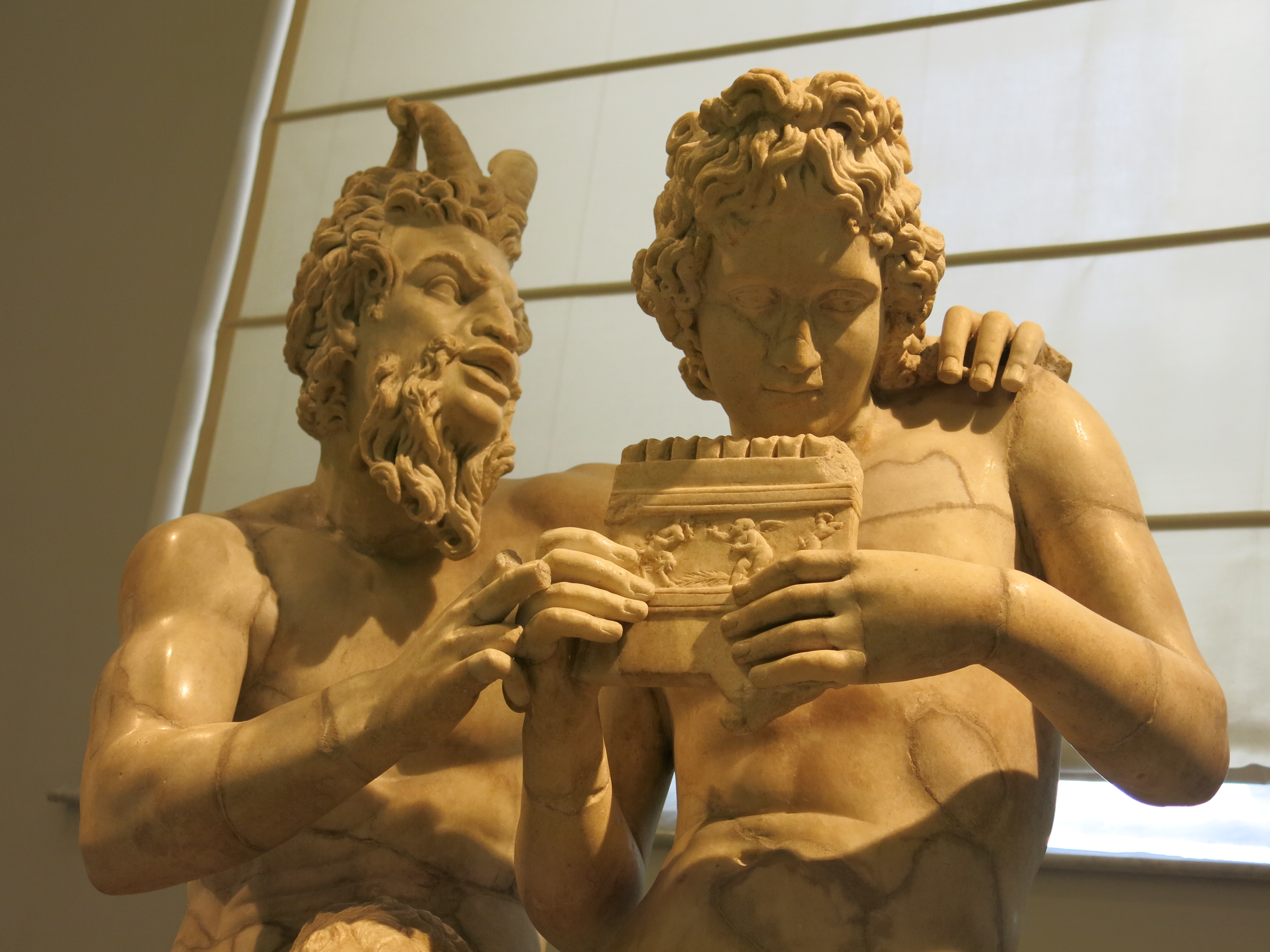
Pan instructing Daphnis on the syrinx

- Syrinx / Pan flute

According to Ovid's Metamorpheses, the original Syrinx was a Naiad, a water nymph, who ran away from Pan after he tried to woo her. While she fled, she came upon an uncrossable river and prayed to her sisters to transform her so that she may escape Pan. Her Nymph sisters transformed Syrinx into a bundle of reeds which Pan found and fashioned an instrument out of, the Pan flute or syrinx.

==== Orpheus myth ====
Orpheus is a significant figure in the ancient Greek mythology of music. Orpheus was a legendary poet and musician, his lineage is unclear as some sources note him as the son of Apollo, the son of the Muse Calliope, or the son of mortal parents. Orpheus was the pupil and brother of Linus. Linus, by some accounts, is the son of Apollo and the Muse Urania; Linus was the first to be gifted the ability to sing by the Muses, which he passed to Orpheus. Other accounts state that Apollo gave Orpheus a golden lyre and taught him to play, while the muses taught Orpheus to sing.

Orpheus was said to be such a skilled musician that he could charm inanimate objects. According to the Argonautica, Orpheus in his adventures with Jason and the Argonauts, was able to play music more beautiful and louder than the bewitching sirens, allowing the Argonauts to travel safely without being charmed by the sirens. When Orpheus' wife, Eurydice, died, he played a song so mournful that it caused the gods and all the nymphs to weep. Orpheus was then able to travel to the underworld, and with music, softened the heart of Hades enough that he was allowed to return with his wife; however, under the condition that he must not set eyes upon his wife until they finished their travel out of the underworld. Orpheus was unable to fulfill this condition and tragically, his wife vanished forever.

==== Marsyas myth ====
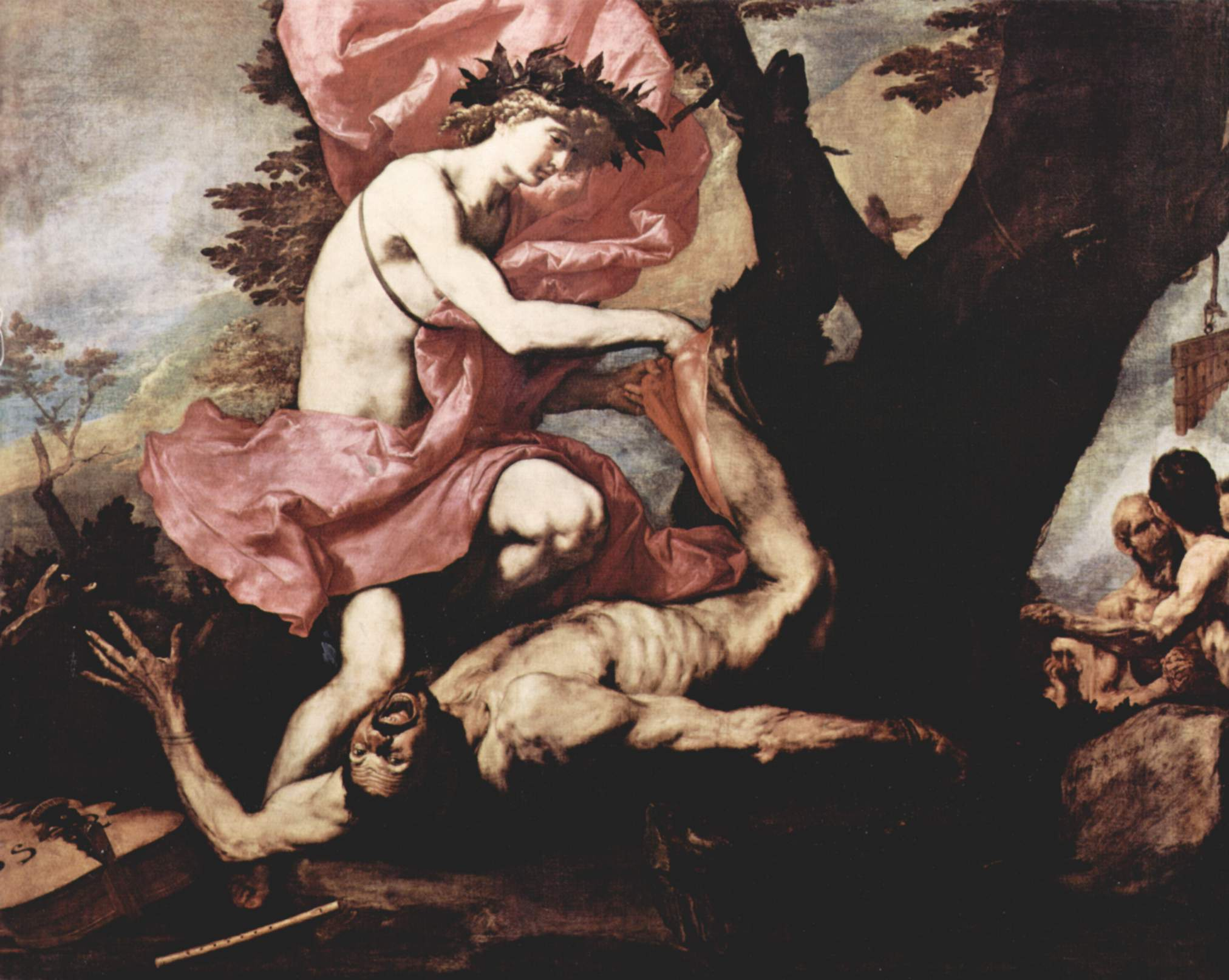
Apollo flaying Marsyas in Apollo and Marsyas by José de Ribera

According to Pseudo-Apollodorus in Bibliotheca, Marsyas the Phrygian satyr once boasted of his skills in the aulos; a musical contest between Marsyas and Apollo was then conducted, where the victor could do "whatever they wanted" to the loser. Marsyas played his aulos so wildly that everyone burst into dance, while Apollo played his lyre so beautifully that everyone cried.

The muses judged the first round to be a draw. According to one account, Apollo then played his lyre upside down, which Marsyas could not do with the aulos. In another account Apollo sang beautifully, which Marsyas could not do. In another account, Marsyas played out of tune and accepted defeat. In all accounts, Apollo then flayed Marsyas alive for losing.

== Greek musical instruments ==
The following were among the instruments used in the music of ancient Greece. The lyre, cithara, aulos, barbiton, hydraulis, and salpinx all found their way into the music of ancient Rome.

=== String ===
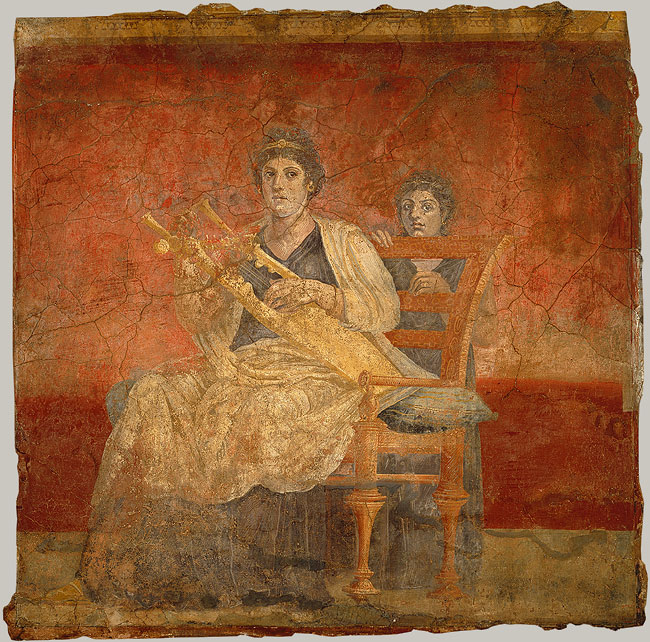
A later vivid Roman representation of a woman playing the kithara, fresco painting, c. 30-40 BC

- Lyre

A strummed and occasionally plucked string instrument, essentially a hand-held zither built on a tortoise-shell (chelys) frame, generally with seven or more strings tuned to the notes of one of the modes. The lyre was a folk-instrument, associated with the cult of Apollo. It was used to accompany others or even oneself for recitation and song, and was the conventional training-instrument for an aristocratic education.

- Skindapsos / Kindapsos

Skindapsos (or kindapsos), generally regarded by modern scholarship as a lyre-like stringed instrument.

- Cithara

Cithara was a professional version of the lyre used by paid musicians. The kithara had a box-type frame with strings stretched from the cross-bar at the top to the sounding box at the bottom; it was held upright and played with a plectrum. The strings were tunable by adjusting wooden wedges along the cross-bar. In the Politics, Aristotle describes the cithara as an "organon technikon", or an artist's instrument, requiring training.

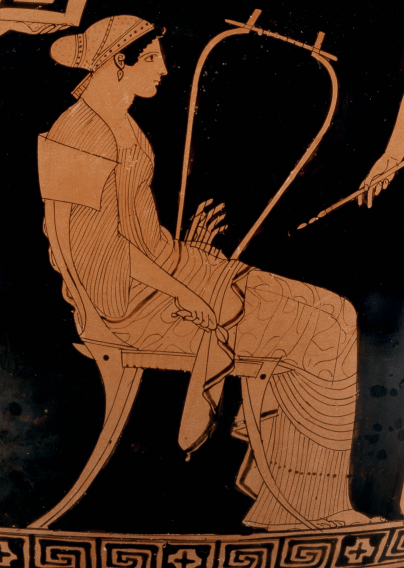
A seated woman playing the barbiton (detail), Attic red-figure amphora, c. 460 BC

- Barbiton

A larger, bass-version of the cithara, considered to be east-Ionian, an exotic and somewhat foreign instrument. The barbiton was the primary instrument of the highly regarded ancient lyricist Sappho, as well as often associated with satyrs.

- Kanonaki

A trapezoidal psaltery, invented by the Pythagoreans in the 6th century BC, however, may have had Mycenaean origins. The kanonaki was held on the thighs of the player, and plucked with both hands with bone pickings.

- Harp

Harps are among the oldest known string instruments, and were in use by Sumerians and Egyptians long before they were present in Greece. The ancient version of the harp resembles a bow, with the strings connecting to the top and bottom of the arch. The strings are perpendicular to the soundbox, while the strings on a lyre are parallel.

=== Wind ===
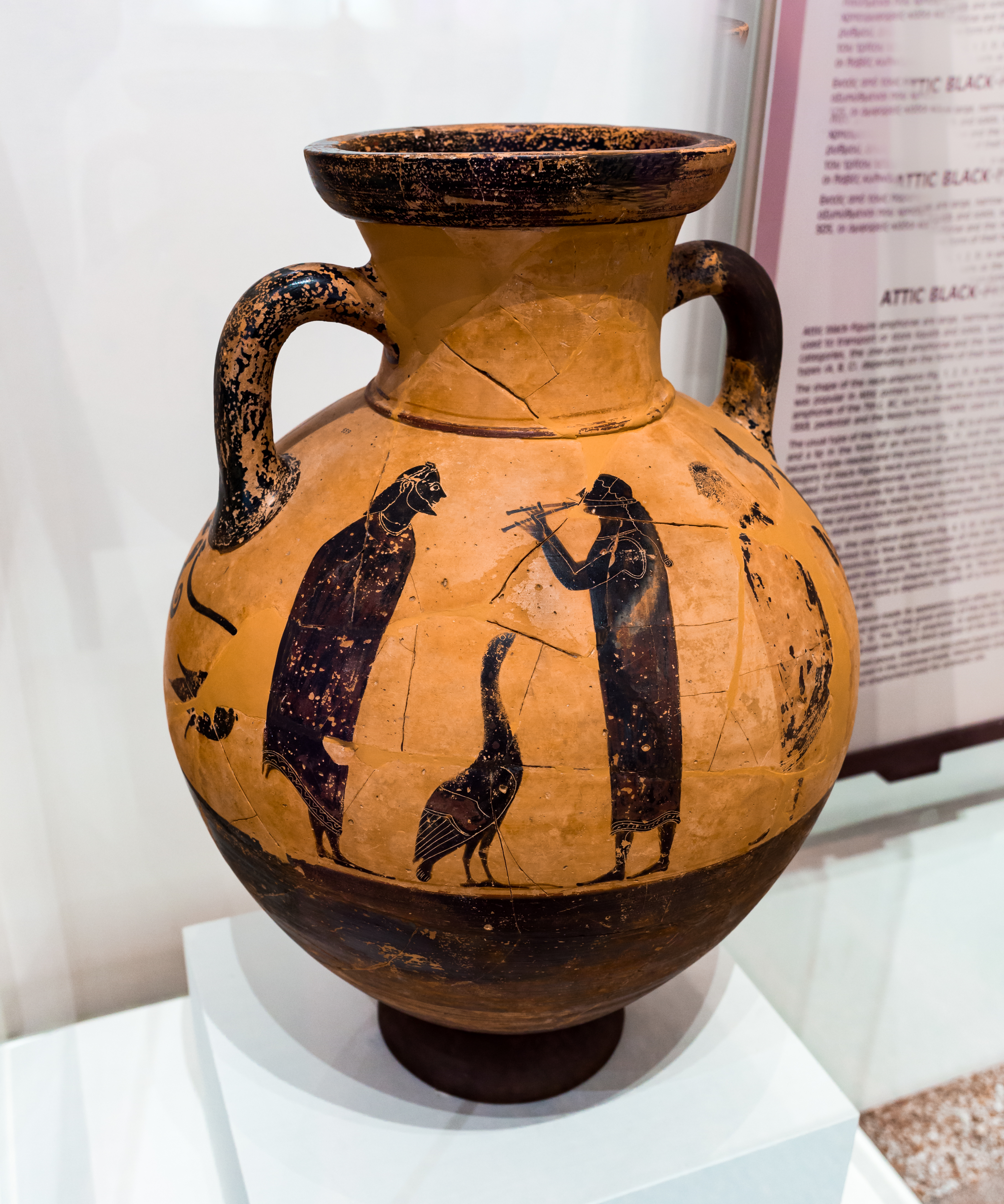
A youth playing the aulon to a bearded man and his goose. Attic black-figure amphora, c. 560 BC.

- Aulos

Usually double, consisting of two double-reed (like an oboe) pipes, not joined but generally played with a mouth-band to hold both pipes steadily between the player's lips. Modern reconstructions of the aulos indicate that they produced a low, clarinet-like sound. There is some confusion about the exact nature of the instrument; alternate descriptions indicate single-reeds instead of double reeds. It was associated with the cult of Dionysus.

- Syrinx or Pan flute

Syrinx (σύριγξ), also known as Pan flute, is an ancient musical instrument based on the principle of the stopped pipe, consisting of a series of such pipes of gradually increasing length, tuned (by cutting) to a desired scale. Sound is produced by blowing across the top of the open pipe (like blowing across a bottle top).

- Hydraulis

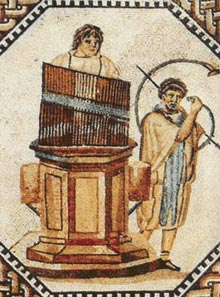
The hydraulis. Note the presence of the curved trumpet, called the bukanē by the Greeks and, later, cornu by the Romans.

A keyboard instrument, the forerunner of the modern pipe organ. As the name indicates, the hydraulis used water to supply a constant flow of pressure to the pipes. Two detailed descriptions have survived: that of Vitruvius and Heron of Alexandria. These descriptions deal primarily with the keyboard mechanism and with the apparatus that supplied the instrument with air. (Note: A well-preserved Hydraulis model made of pottery was found at Carthage in 1885. Essentially, the air to the pipes that produce the sound comes from a wind-chest connected by a pipe to a dome; air is pumped in to compress water, and the water rises in the dome, compressing the air, and causing a steady supply of air to the pipes.)

- Salpinx

A brass trumpet used for military calls, and even contested in the Olympics. A number of sources mention this metal instrument with a bone mouthpiece.

=== Percussion ===
- Tympanum

Tympanum, also called tympanon, is a type of frame drum or tambourine. It was circular, shallow, and beaten with the palm of the hand or a stick.

- Crotalum

The crotalum was a kind of clapper or castanet used in religious dances by groups.

- Koudounia

The Koudounia are bell-like percussion instruments made of copper.

- Xylyphion (twig or beater)

The Suda preserves an account of a percussion instrument made of clay saucers and earthenware vessels, played by striking them with a xylyphion (ξυλύφιον), a small wooden twig or beater.

== Music and philosophy ==
=== Pythagoras ===
The enigmatic ancient Greek figure of Pythagoras with mathematical devotion laid the foundations of our knowledge of the study of harmonics—how strings and columns of air vibrate, how they produce overtones, how the overtones are related arithmetically to one another, etc. It was common to hear of the "music of the spheres" from the Pythagoreans. After studying the sound hammers made in a blacksmith's forge, Pythagoras invented the monochord, which has a movable bridge along with a string stretched over a sounding board. Using the monochord, he found the association between the vibrations and the lengths of the strings.

=== Plato ===
At a certain point, Plato complained about the new music:

Our music was once divided into its proper forms ... It was not permitted to exchange the melodic styles of these established forms and others. Knowledge and informed judgment penalized disobedience. There were no whistles, unmusical mob-noises, or clapping for applause. The rule was to listen silently and learn; boys, teachers, and the crowd were kept in order by threat of the stick. ... But later, an unmusical anarchy was led by poets who had natural talent, but were ignorant of the laws of music ... Through foolishness they deceived themselves into thinking that there was no right or wrong way in music, that it was to be judged good or bad by the pleasure it gave. By their works and their theories they infected the masses with the presumption to think themselves adequate judges. So our theatres, once silent, grew vocal, and aristocracy of music gave way to a pernicious theatrocracy ... the criterion was not music, but a reputation for promiscuous cleverness and a spirit of law-breaking.

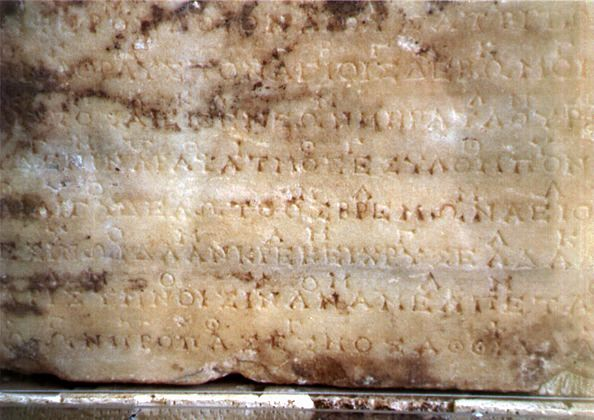
Photograph of the original stone at Delphi containing the second of the two hymns to Apollo. The music notation is the line of occasional symbols above the main, uninterrupted line of Greek lettering.

From his references to "established forms" and "laws of music" we can assume that at least some of the formality of the Pythagorean system of harmonics and consonance had taken hold of Greek music, at least as it was performed by professional musicians in public, and that Plato was complaining about the falling away from such principles into a "spirit of law-breaking".

Playing what "sounded good" violated the established ethos of modes that the Greeks had developed by the time of Plato: a complex system of relating certain emotional and spiritual characteristics to certain modes (scales). The names for the various modes derived from the names of Greek tribes and peoples, the temperament and emotions of which were said to be characterized by the unique sound of each mode. Thus, Dorian modes were "harsh", Phrygian modes "sensual", and so forth. In his Republic, Plato talks about the proper use of various modes, the Dorian, Phrygian, Lydian, etc. It is difficult for the modern listener to relate to that concept of ethos in music except by comparing our own perceptions that a minor scale is used for melancholy and a major scale for virtually everything else, from happy to heroic music.

The sounds of scales vary depending on the placement of tones. Modern Western scales use the placement of whole tones, such as C to D on a modern piano keyboard, and half tones, such as C to C-sharp, but not quarter-tones ("in the cracks" on a modern keyboard) at all. This limit on tone types creates relatively few kinds of scales in modern Western music compared to that of the Greeks, who used the placement of whole-tones, half-tones, and even quarter-tones (or still smaller intervals) to develop a large repertoire of scales, each with a unique ethos. The Greek concepts of scales (including the names) found its way into later Roman music and then the European Middle Ages to the extent that one can find references to, for example, a "Lydian church mode", although name is simply a historical reference with no relationship to the original Greek sound or ethos.

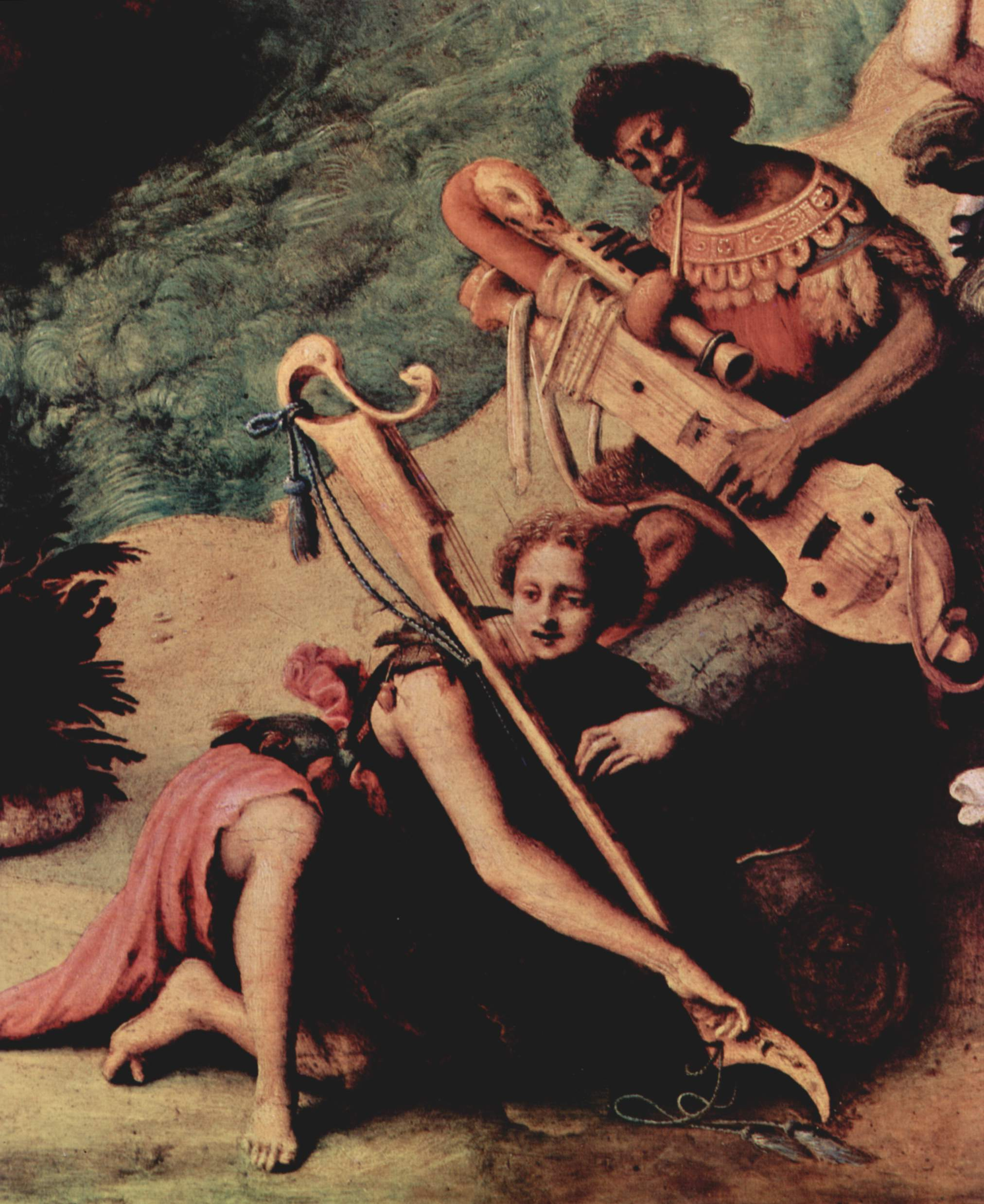
Detail from Piero di Cosimo's 16th-century version of Perseus rescuing Andromeda. The instrument in the hands of the musician is an anachronism and appears to be an imaginary combination of a plucked string instrument and bassoon.

From the descriptions that have come down to us through the writings of those such as Plato, Aristoxenus and, later, Boethius, we can say with some caution that the ancient Greeks, at least before Plato, heard primarily monophonic music; that is, music built on single melodies based on a system of modes/scales, themselves built on the concept that notes should be placed between consonant intervals. It is a commonplace of musicology to say that harmony, in the sense of a developed system of composition, in which many tones at once contribute to the listener's expectation of resolution, was invented in the European Middle Ages and that ancient cultures had no developed system of harmony—that is, for example, playing the third and seventh above the dominant, in order to create the expectation for the listener that the tritone will resolve to the third.

Plato's Republic notes that Greek musicians sometimes played more than one note at a time, although this was apparently considered an advanced technique. The Orestes fragment of Euripides seems to clearly call for more than one note to be sounded at once. Research in the field of music from the ancient Mediterranean—decipherings of cuneiform music script—argue for the sounding of different pitches simultaneously and for the theoretical recognition of a "scale" many centuries before the Greeks learned to write, which they would have done before they developed their system for notating music and recorded the written evidence for simultaneous tones. All we can say from the available evidence is that, while Greek musicians clearly employed the technique of sounding more than one note at the same time, the most basic, common texture of Greek music was monophonic.

That much seems evident from another passage from Plato:

... The lyre should be used together with the voices ... the player and the pupil producing note for note in unison, Heterophony and embroidery by the lyre—the strings throwing out melodic lines different from the melodia which the poet composed; crowded notes where his are sparse, quick time to his slow ... and similarly all sorts of rhythmic complications against the voices—none of this should be imposed upon pupils ...

=== Aristotle ===
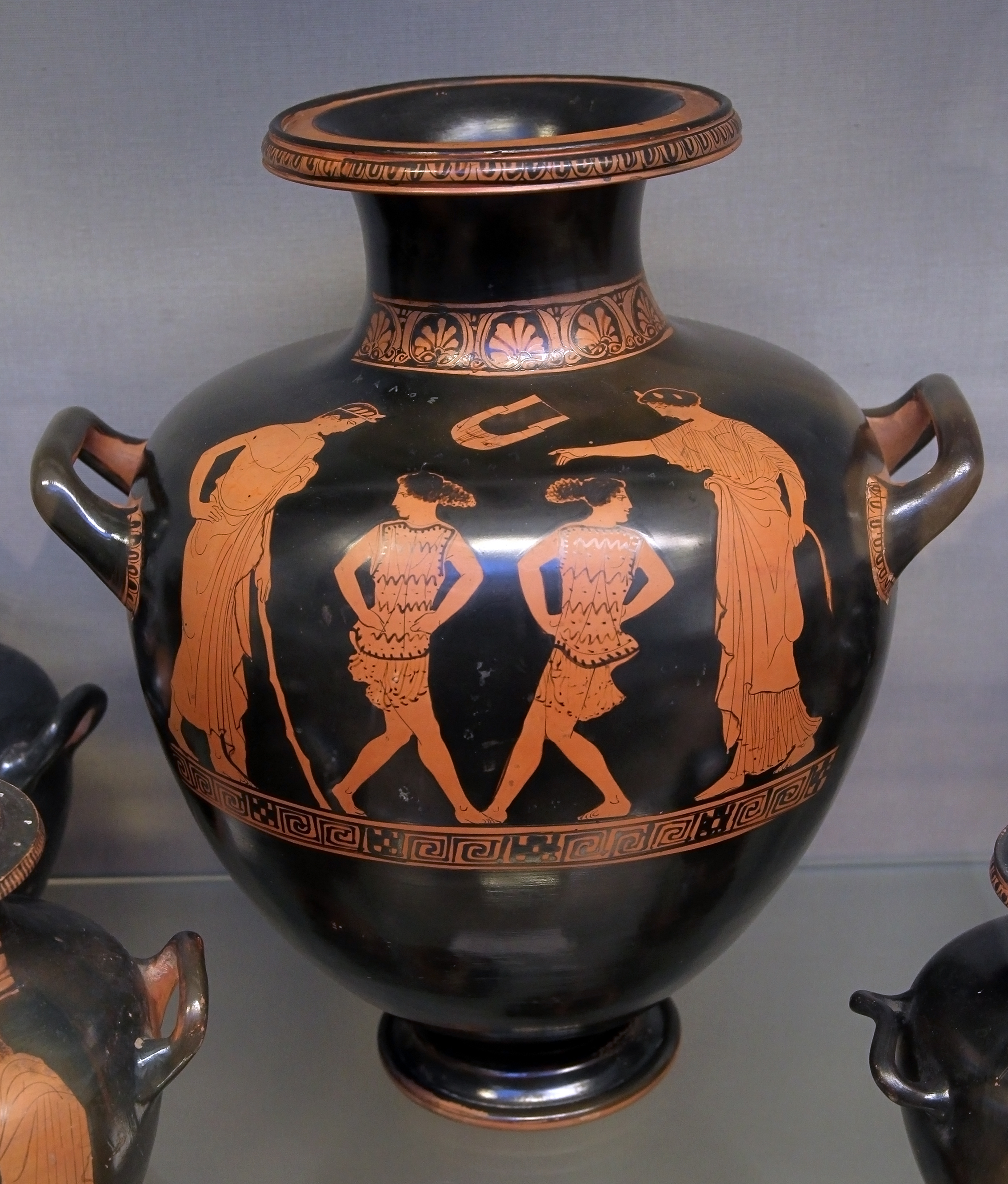
Girls dancing with an instructress and a youth, c. 430 BC, found at Capua. British Museum

Aristotle had a strong belief that music should be a part of one's education, alongside reading and writing, and gymnastics. Just as men must work hard in their duties, they must also be able to relax well. According to Aristotle, all men could agree that music was one of the most pleasurable things, so to have this as a means of leisure was only logical. Amusing oneself was not considered a viable hobby, or else we would not want to help in society. Since music combined relaxing ourselves, along with others, Aristotle claimed that learning an instrument was essential to our development.

Virtues is a topic that Aristotle is widely known for, and he also used them to justify why music should be involved in education. Since virtues consist of loving and rejoicing in something, then music could be pursued without issue. Music forms our character, so it should also be a part of our education. Aristotle also comments on how getting children involved in music would be a way to keep them occupied and quiet. Since music helps in forming the character, it could cause either adverse or pleasant effects. The way in which music is taught can have a large impact on development.

Learning music should not interfere with the younger years, nor should it damage the body in a way that a person is unable to fulfill duties in the military. Those who have learned music in education should not be at the same level as a professional, but they should have a greater knowledge than the slaves and other commoners. Aristotle was specific in what instruments should be learned. The harp and flute should not be taught in school, as they are too complicated. Additionally, only certain melodies have benefits in an educational setting. Ethical melodies should be taught, but melodies of passion and melodies of action should be for performances.

== Surviving music ==
=== Classical Period ===
- Eleusis inv. 907 (trumpet signal)
- Dionysius of Halicarnassus, Comp. 63 f.
- Euripides, Orestes, Papyrus Vienna G 2315
- Papyrus Leiden inv. P. 510 (Euripides, Iphigenia in Aulis)

=== Hellenistic Period ===
- Papyrus Ashm. inv. 89B/31, 33
- Papyrus Ashm. inv. 89B/29-32 (citharodic nomes)
- Papyrus Hibeh 231
- Papyrus Zeno 59533
- Papyrus Vienna G 29825 a/b recto
- Papyrus Vienna G 29825 a/b verso
- Papyrus Vienna G 29825 c
- Papyrus Vienna G 29825 d-f
- Papyrus Vienna G 13763/1494
- Papyrus Berlin 6870
- Epidaurus, SEG 30. 390 (Hymn to Asclepius)

=== Roman imperial period ===
- Delphic Hymns
- Seikilos epitaph
- Hymns of Mesomedes

== See also ==
- Nomos (music)
- Oxyrhynchus hymn
- Music of ancient Rome
- Music in ancient India
- For a technical discussion, Musical system of ancient Greece or Ancient Greek Musical Notation
