= 1st millennium in music =

1st millennium BC in music – 1st millennium in music – 11th century in music

== Events ==
- ca. 150 – Claudius Ptolemaeus writes his treatise Harmonics
- ca. 510 – Boethius writes De institutione musica as one part of his "quadrivium"
- ca. 635 – Isidore of Seville compiles the Etymologiae
- ca. 795–800 – Tonary of St Riquier, the earliest Western source organized according to the eight Gregorian modes, borrowed from the Byzantine octoechos system
- 9th century – Notker the Stammerer explains the supplementary letters for neumatic notation in his Epistola ad Lantbertum
- ca. 850 – Aurelian of Réôme writes the earliest extant medieval treatise on music, Musica disciplina
- ca. 890 – compilation of the Musica enchiriadis, the earliest known treatise on polyphony
- ca. 900 – compilation of the Scolica enchiriadis, a commentary on the Musica enchiriadis
- ca. 908–915 – Regino of Prüm writes De harmonica institutione, the first full tonary for the texts of the liturgy, at St. Martin of Trier

== Compositions ==
- ca. 1st century – Seikilos epitaph, the oldest surviving complete piece of music
- late 3rd century – Oxyrhynchus hymn, the earliest known Christian hymn to contain both lyrics and musical notation
- 387 – Te Deum, early Christian hymn
- ca. 6th–7th century – Jieshi Diao Youlan No. 5, Chinese guqin melody, oldest extant substantial written melody
- ca. 9th–10th century – Gregorian chants first used (see list of Gregorian chants)
- 884 – Liber Hymnorum completed by Notker the Stammerer at the Abbey of Saint Gall in Switzerland

== Births ==
- ca. 83 – Claudius Ptolemaeus
- 1st century - Mesomedes
- ca. 480 – Anicius Manlius Severinus Boethius
- ca. 767/772 – Ishaq al-Mawsili
- ca. 840 – Notker the Stammerer
- ca. 850 – Hucbald
- ca. 850 – Tuotilo

== Deaths ==
- 161 – Claudius Ptolemaeus
- ca. 524 – Anicius Manlius Severinus Boethius
- 4 April 636 – Isidore of Seville
- 864 – Hartmann of Saint Gall
- ca. 890 – Ratpert of Saint Gall
- 915 – Regino of Prüm
- 27 April 915 – Tuotilo
- 6 April 919 – Notker the Stammerer
- 20 June 930 – Hucbald of St. Amand

== See also ==
- Timeline of musical events

== Sources ==
- Apel, Willi. 1958. Gregorian Chant. Bloomington and London: Indiana University Press.
- Bellingham, Jane. 2001. "Aurelian of Réôme [Aurelianus Reomensis]". The New Grove Dictionary of Music and Musicians, second edition, edited by Stanley Sadie and John Tyrrell. London: Macmillan Publishers.
- Bower, Calvin. 2001. "Boethius [Anicius Manlius Severinus Boethius]". The New Grove Dictionary of Music and Musicians, second edition, edited by Stanley Sadie and John Tyrrell. London: Macmillan Publishers.
- Chartier, Yves. 2001. "Hucbald of St Amand". The New Grove Dictionary of Music and Musicians, second edition, edited by Stanley Sadie and John Tyrrell. London: Macmillan Publishers.
- Clark, James Midgley. 1926. The Abbey of St Gall as a Centre of Literature and Art. Cambridge: The University Press.
- Erickson, Raymond. 2001. "Musica enchiriadis, Scholia enchiriadis". The New Grove Dictionary of Music and Musicians, second edition, edited by Stanley Sadie and John Tyrrell. London: Macmillan Publishers.
- Hiley, David. 2001. "Notker". The New Grove Dictionary of Music and Musicians, second edition, edited by Stanley Sadie and John Tyrrell. London: Macmillan Publishers.
- Neubauer, Eckhard (2001). "Mawṣilī, al- family". Grove Music Online. Oxford: Oxford University Press. doi:10.1093/gmo/9781561592630.article.51032. (subscription, Wikilibrary access, or UK public library membership required)
- O'Connor, John Bonaventure. 1910. "St. Isidore of Seville". The Catholic Encyclopedia, vol. 8. New York: Robert Appleton Company (accessed 12 September 2014).
- Planchart, Alejandro Enrique. 2001a. "St Gallen". The New Grove Dictionary of Music and Musicians, second edition, edited by Stanley Sadie and John Tyrrell. London: Macmillan Publishers.
- Planchart, Alejandro Enrique. 2001b. "Tuotilo [Tutilo]". The New Grove Dictionary of Music and Musicians, second edition, edited by Stanley Sadie and John Tyrrell. London: Macmillan Publishers.
- Pöhlmann, Egert, and Martin L. West. 2001. Documents of Ancient Greek Music: The Extant Melodies and Fragments. Oxford: Clarendon Press. ISBN 0-19-815223-X.
- Powers, Harold S., and Frans Wiering. 2001. "Mode, §II: Medieval Modal Theory". The New Grove Dictionary of Music and Musicians, second edition, edited by Stanley Sadie and John Tyrrell. London: Macmillan Publishers.
- Reckow, Fritz, Edward H. Roesner, Rudolf Flotzinger, and Norman E. Smith. 2001. "Organum". The New Grove Dictionary of Music and Musicians, second edition, edited by Stanley Sadie and John Tyrrel. London: Macmillan Publishers.
- Richter, Lukas. 2001. "Ptolemy [Klaudios Ptolemaios; Claudius Ptolemaeus]". The New Grove Dictionary of Music and Musicians, second edition, edited by Stanley Sadie and John Tyrrell. London: Macmillan Publishers.
- Sanderson, Warren. 1982. "Archbishop Radbod, Regino of Prüm and Late Carolingian Art and Music in Trier". Jahrbuch der Berliner Museen 24:41–61.
- Weakland, Rembert. 1956. "Hucbald as Musician and Theorist". The Musical Quarterly 42, no. 1 (January): 66–84.
