= Prosodion =

Type of Ancient Greek song

Prosodion (Greek: προσόδιον) in ancient Greece was a processional song to the altar of a deity, mainly Apollo or Artemis, sung ritually before the Paean hymn. It is one of the earliest musical types used by the Greeks. The prosodion was accompanied by the aulos, whereas the associated paean (performed while standing) was accompanied by the kithara. Prosodia were composed by Alcman, Pindar, Simonides of Ceos, Bacchylides, Eumelus of Corinth, and Limenius (whose prosodion follows its paean, rather than preceding it), as well the various winners in art competitions (Mouseia). The etymology of the word is related to ὁδός hodos road and not with ᾠδή ôidê song. According to Soterichus, the music of the prosodia by Alcman, Pindar, Simonides, and Bacchylides was written in the Dorian tonos "because of its grandeur and dignity". The only complete surviving prosodion (part of the Second Delphic Hymn by Limenius), however, is composed in the Lydian tonos.
