= Nomos (music) =

Greek music genre

The nomos (Greek: νόμος), also nome, is a genre of ancient Greek music, either solo instrumental or for voice accompanied by an instrument, characterized by a style of great complexity. It came to be associated with virtuoso performers. Although it designates a specific, nameable melody, it is unclear just how fixed it might have been in detail. Most likely, each performer was given some freedom to vary and interpret the melody, using musical phrases and gestures that would change from one performance to another.

== Etymology ==
The root sense of the Greek word νόμος is "that which is in habitual practice, use or possession"; its specific musical sense is "melody, strain". In the particular application to these melody types called nomoi, it may be translated as "set piece".

== Types ==
There are four types of nomoi, two vocal and two purely instrumental:

1. Kitharoedic nomoi, the earliest type, sung to the accompaniment of a kithara, associated with Terpander of Sparta (early seventh century BC)
2. Auloedic nomoi, sung to the accompaniment of an aulos, first devised by Clonas or Ardalus of Troezen
3. Auletic nomoi, extended compositions for solo aulos, introduced at the Pythian games in 586 BC
4. Kitharistic nomoi, solo instrumental works for kithara, introduced at the Pythian games in 558 BC

== Composers/performers ==
Chrysothemis of Crete, costumed as Apollo, was the first to sing a solo nomos, accompanying himself on the kithara. Lysias names as particularly skilled musicians in this genre Polymnestus, Olympus of Mysia, Mimnermus, and Sacadas.
