= Delphic Hymns =

Musical compositions from Ancient Greece

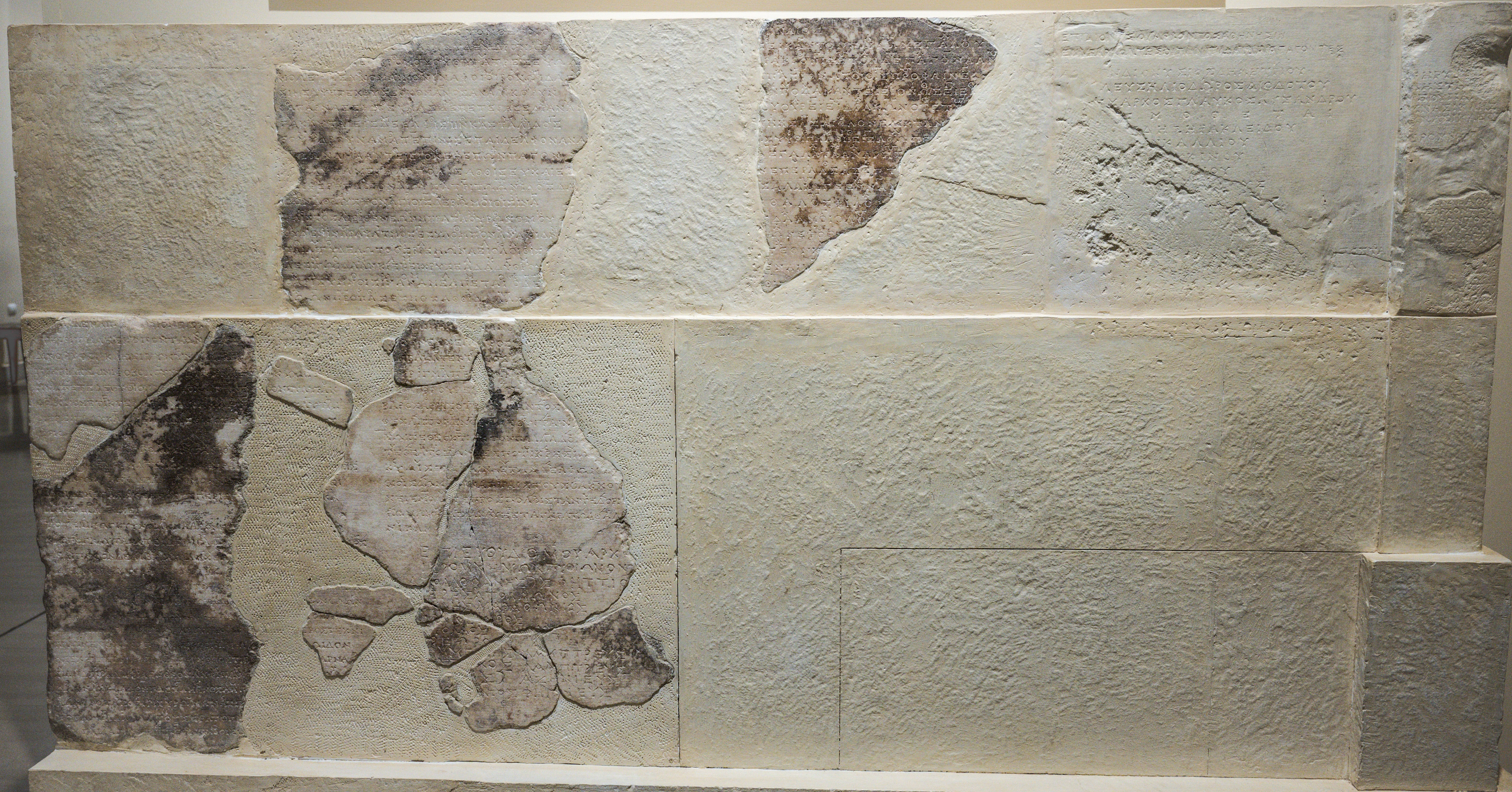
Fragments of both hymns in the Delphi Archaeological Museum

The Delphic Hymns are two musical compositions from Ancient Greece, which survive in substantial fragments. They were long regarded as being dated c. 138 BC and 128 BC, respectively, but recent scholarship has shown it likely they were both written for performance at the Athenian Pythaids in 128 BC. If indeed it dates from ten years before the second, the First Delphic Hymn is the earliest unambiguous surviving example of notated music from anywhere in the Western world whose composer is known by name. Inscriptions indicate that the First Delphic Hymn was written by Athenaeus, son of Athenaeus, while Limenius is credited as the Second Delphic Hymn's composer.

== History ==
Both Delphic Hymns were addressed to Apollo, and were found inscribed on stone fragments from the south outer wall of the Athenian Treasury at Delphi in 1893 by French archaeologist Théophile Homolle, while Henri Weil restored the Greek text and Théodore Reinach transcribed the music to modern notation.) Reconstruction of the fragments was facilitated by the fact that the First Hymn uses vocal notation, and the second one employs instrumental notation. It was long believed that all that could be told of the composer of the First Hymn is that it was written by an Athenian, around 138 BC, since the heading of the inscription giving the name of the composer is damaged and difficult to read. However, careful reading of this inscription shows that it cannot be the ethnic "Athenaîos" (from Athens), but rather names "Athēnaios Athēnaiou" (Athénaios son of Athénaios) as the composer. The Second Delphic hymn has been dated to precisely 128 BC; evidently it was first performed in the same year. The name of the composer has also survived, both in the heading of the hymn and in a separate inscription: Limēnios, son of Thoinos, an Athenian. The occasion of the performance of both hymns was a Pythaid, a special religious procession of the Athenians towards Delphi held on specific occasions, usually after certain omens.

== First Delphic Hymn ==
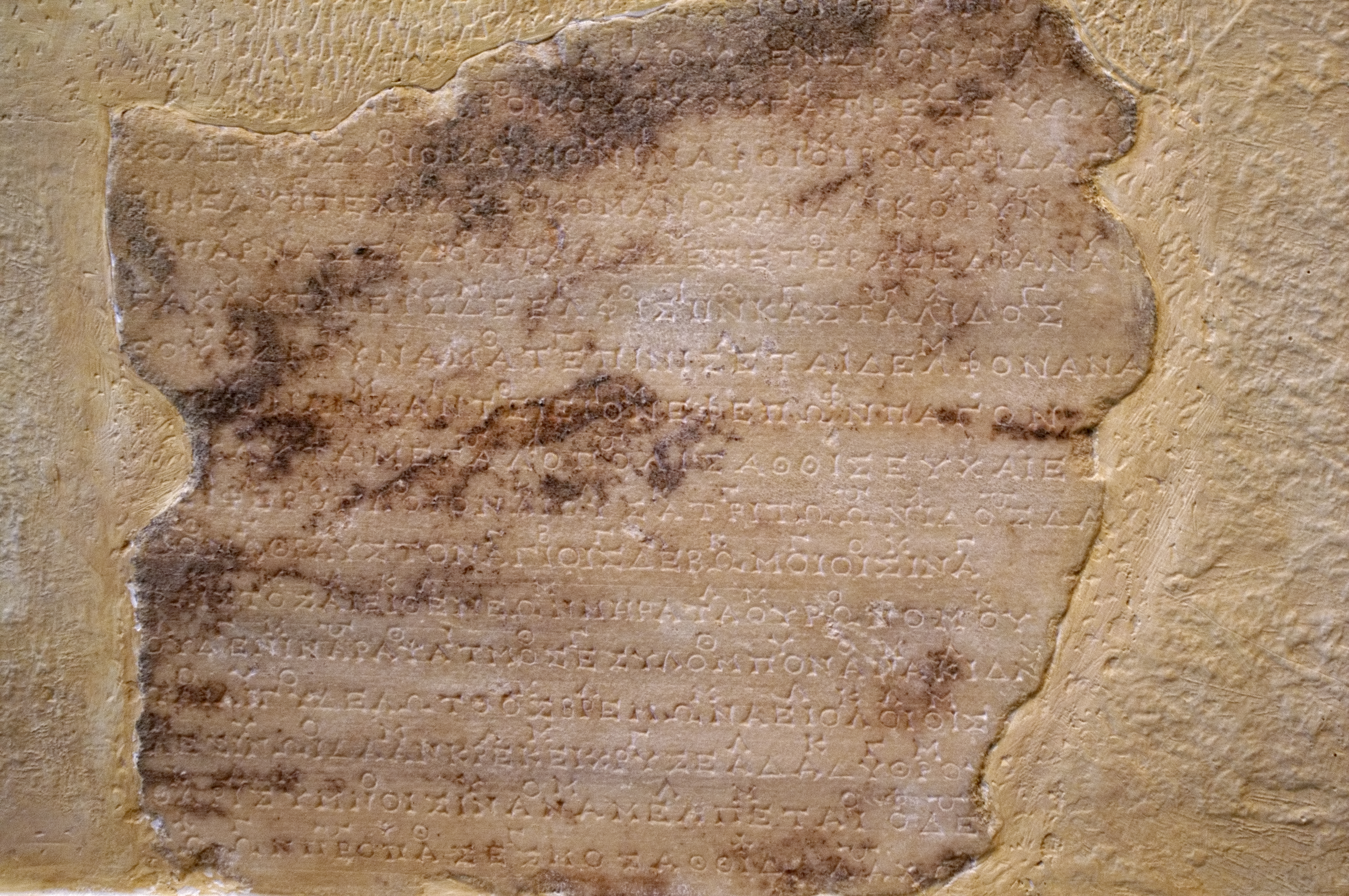
First Delphic Hymn, 1st and 2nd verse

Both hymns are monophonic (consisting of a single melodic line), but are differentiated by their notation. The First Hymn is in so-called vocal notation and it is in the cretic (quintuple) meter throughout.

The First Delphic Hymn falls into two large parts, a Paean (lines 1–27), in three verses, and what might have been called a Hyporchema or dance (lines 27–34). However, almost all of the last part is lost.

=== First verse ===
The image below shows the first verse of the hymn in conventional transcription. The letters above the words represent the notes of music. Various modern recordings of the music can be found in External links (see below).

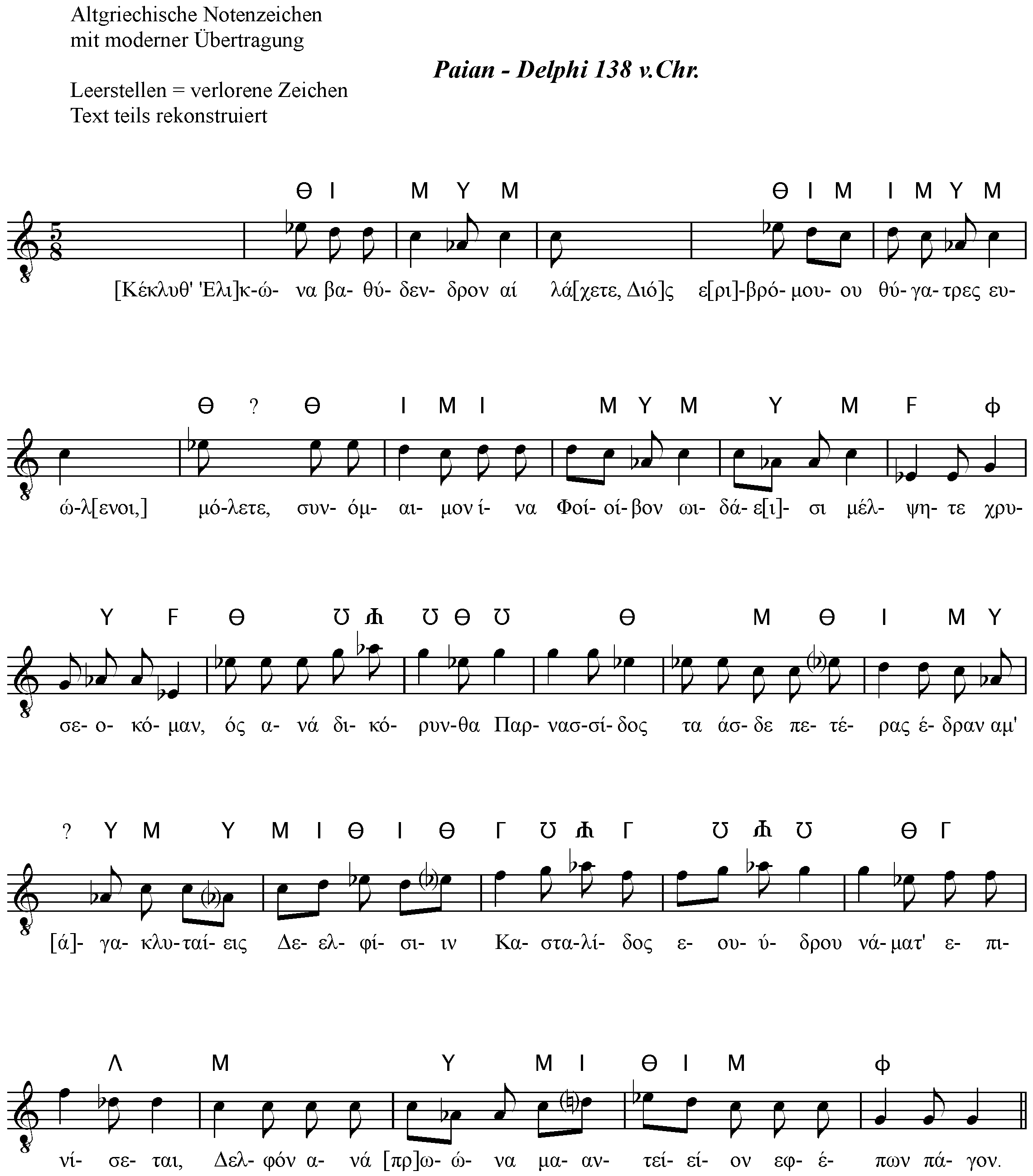
First stanza of the First Delphic Hymn. The pitch of the transcription is conventional; in performance the pitch would probably have been about a minor third lower.

In this verse the singers call on the Muses (goddesses of music and dance) to leave their home on Mount Helicon and to join in the song in honour of Apollo. This part has been translated by Armand d'Angour as follows:

Hark, you whose domain is deep-forested Helicon, loud-thundering Zeus' fair-armed daughters: come with songs to celebrate your brother Phoebus of the golden hair, who over the twin peaks of this mountain, Parnassus, accompanied by the far-famed Delphic maidens, comes to the streams of the flowing Castalian spring as he visits his mountain oracle.

Ten different notes in all are used in this first verse. The fourth note from the bottom, written Μ (Mu in the Greek alphabet, or the note C in the conventional modern transcription) is the so-called mesē, or central note, to which the music most often returns. Music with this mese was said to be in the (Greek) Phrygian mode (modern Dorian mode). There are more notes above the mese than below it. F and B♭ below the mese are not used, and the lowest note, here E♭, is used only in the first section of the hymn. The note immediately above the mese D♭ (written Λ Lambda in Greek) occurs only in one place in section one, in bar 24, but is much more extensively used in verse 2.

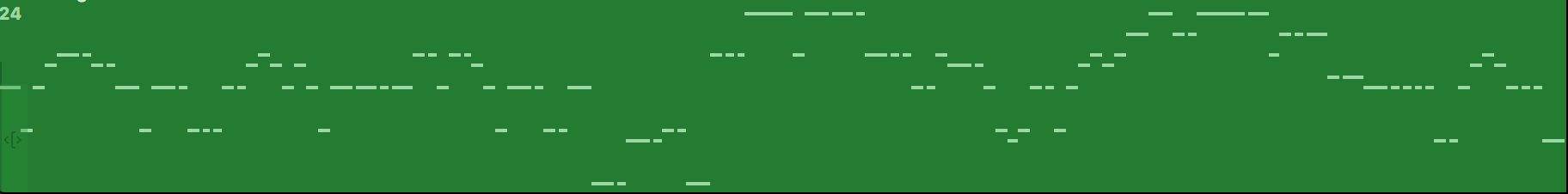
The pattern of the music in part A of the First Delphic Hymn, clearly showing the repeated use of the mesē or central note

According to Pöhlmann and West, an archaic pentatonic effect is produced in the lowest tetrachords by avoiding the lichanos, while above the mese there is modulation between a conjunct chromatic tetrachord (C D♭ D F) and a disjunct diatonic one (D E♭ F G), extended by two more chromatic notes, A♭ and A. (A tetrachord is a series of four consecutive notes covering the interval of a fourth, e.g. C, B♭, A♭, G; the lichanos ("forefinger string") was the second note of a tetrachord going down; the "conjunct tetrachord" is the tetrachord whose lowest note is the mese; and the "disjunct tetrachord" is the one whose lowest note is the string above the mese).

=== Second verse ===
The second verse describes the presence of the delegation from Attica and the sacrifice of Arabian incense and young bulls that they are making. It also mentions the sound of the pipes (auloi) and the kithara (lyre) accompanying the sacrifice.

The text reads:

Behold, Attica with its great city [Athens] is at prayer, dwellers on the unconquered land of the armed Tritonian goddess [Athena]; and on the holy altars Hephaistos [i.e. fire] consumes the thighs of bull-calves; and together with the smoke, Arabian incense rises to the heavens. And the shrill, blaring aulos weaves a melody with fluttering notes, and the golden, sweet-voiced kithara blends with the song of praise.

In this verse there is a change of key; according to Pöhlmann and West it changes from the (Greek) Phrygian mode to the Hyperphrygian. There is extensive use of the notes (D♭ and D) immediately above the mese, and there is also repeated use of the note B♮ (written with the letter Ο Omicron in Greek notation) immediately below the mese. The strings of Greek kithara (lyre) were not tuned in exactly the same way as those of a modern piano, and the intervals from C to D♭ and from D♭ to D were probably less than a modern semitone. Therefore, in this section the music wanders around a small group of closely spaced notes. The technical term for a group of closely spaced notes like this is a pyknon.

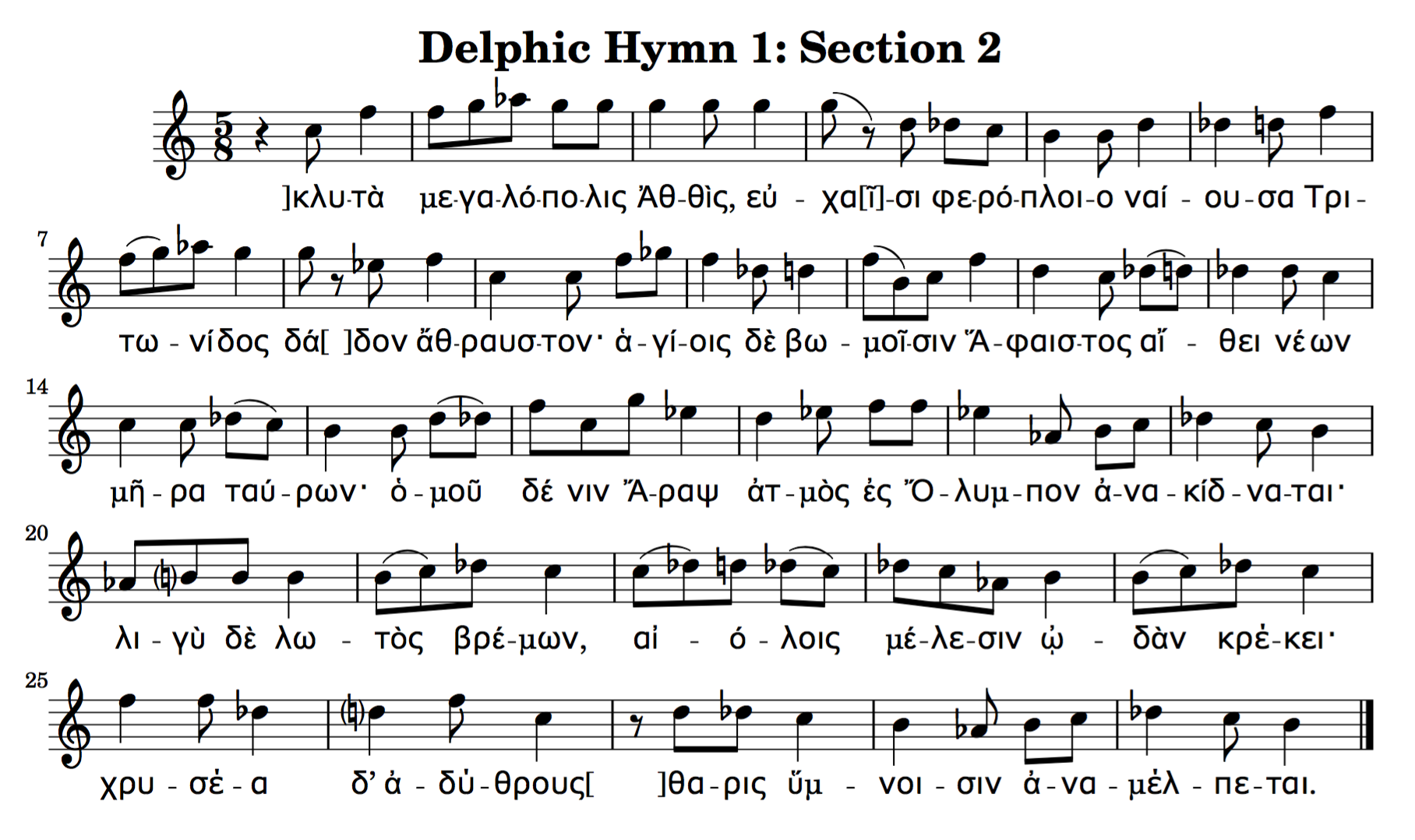
The second verse of the First Delphic Hymn transcribed into modern musical notation. The fourth line, where the music wanders through the narrow range of notes of the pyknon, describes the melody of the aulos or pipe.

The photograph below shows part of verse 2 and the beginning of verse 3 on the inscription, starting from the word φερόπλοιο pheróploio "carrying arms" and ending at Ἀθθίδα Aththída "Attica".

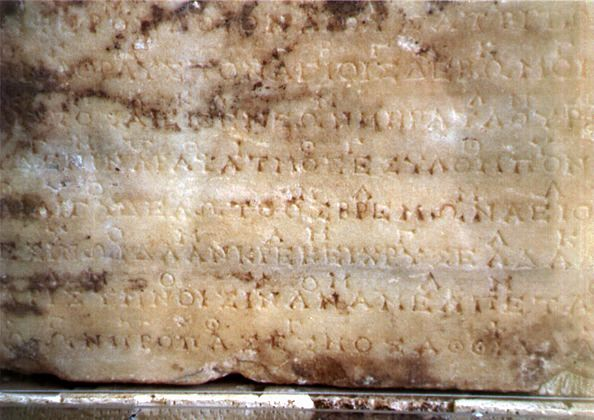
Photograph of the original stone at Delphi containing the first of the two hymns to Apollo. The music notation is the line of occasional symbols above the main, uninterrupted line of Greek lettering.

=== Third verse ===
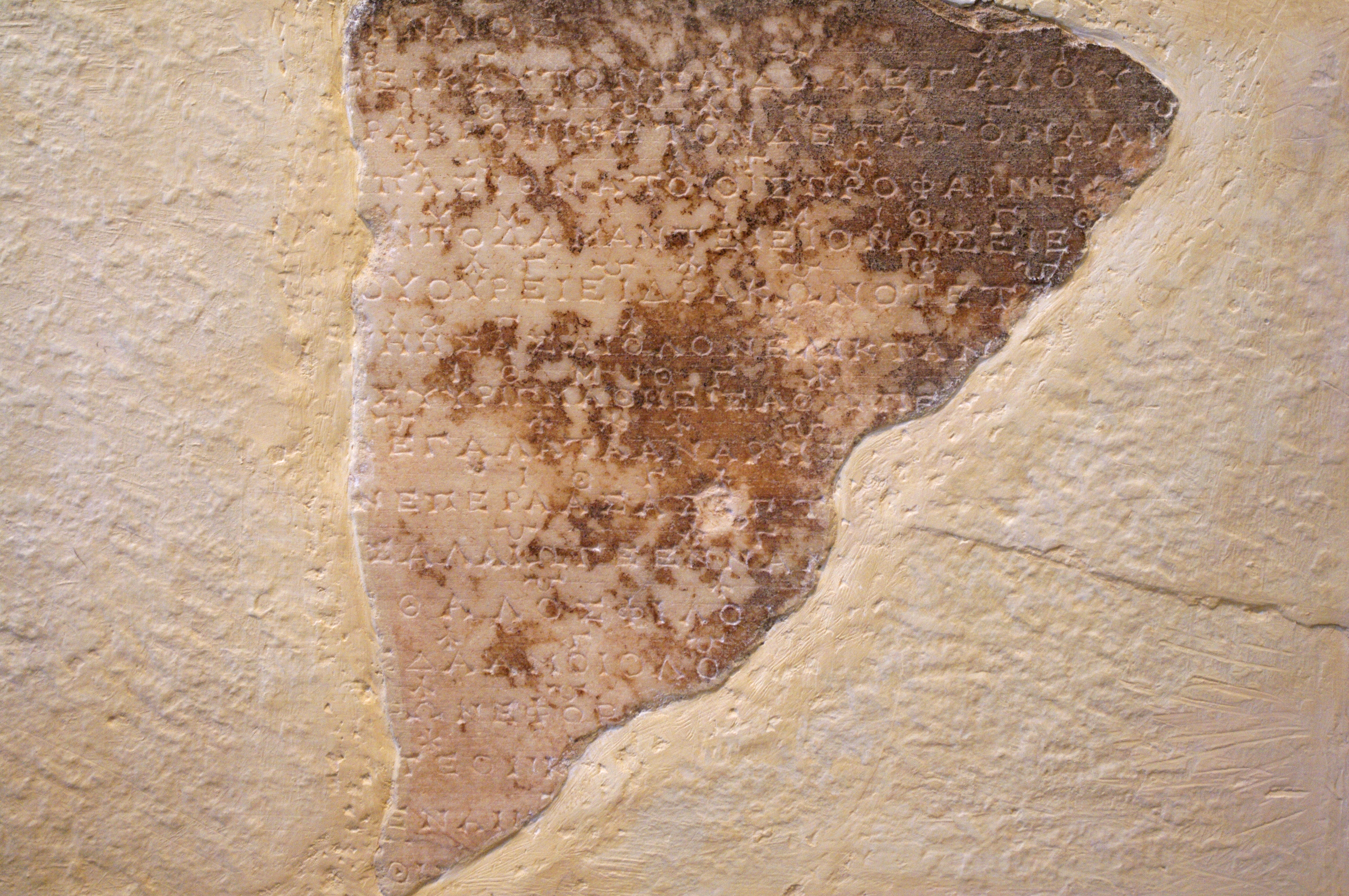
First Delphic Hymn, 3rd verse

The third verse is rather fragmentary, with several gaps in the words and music, but enough survives to make sense of it. In this verse the singers address Apollo directly, and describe how he took over the prophetic tripod at Delphi after killing the snake that guarded it, and how once he thwarted an army of invading Gauls (see: Brennus (3rd century BC)).

This verse returns to the same key as the first. As in the first verse, the small intervals above and below the mese are once again not used. There are some octave leaps, and "the tone is bright and clear".

== Second Delphic Hymn ==
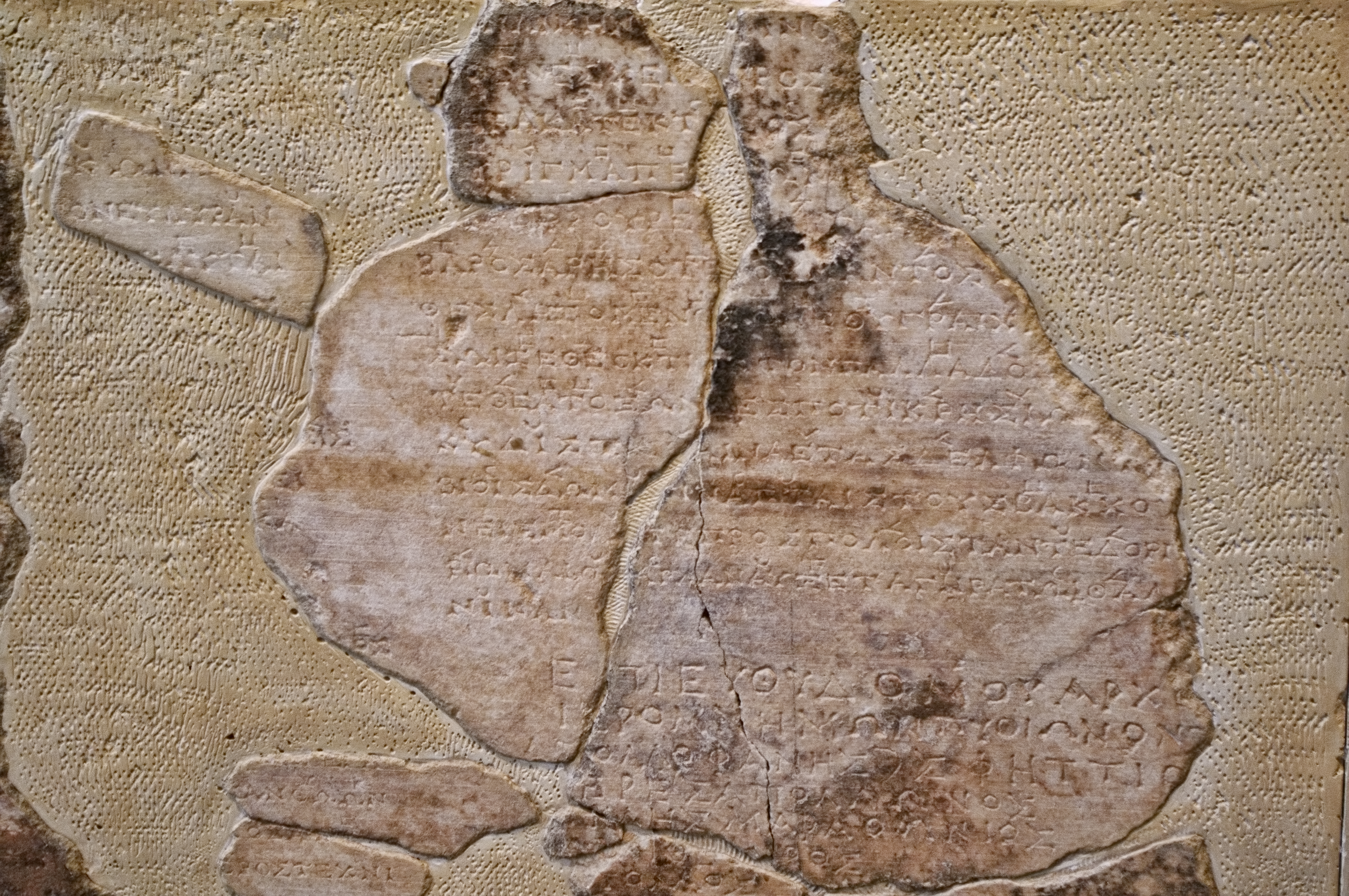
Second Delphic Hymn

The Second Hymn is headed Paean and Prosodion to the God and is described as having been composed by Limēnios son of Thoinos, an Athenian. It consists of ten sections in all, the first nine in cretic metre constituting the paean, while the tenth in aeolic rhythms (glyconics and choriambic dimeters) is the prosodion. Slightly more lines of the music have survived than in the first hymn, but there are also numerous gaps where the stone has been broken. The style and subject matter of the second hymn is similar to the first, but the musical notation is different. In this hymn the notes are written with the symbols used by instrumental players (see below).

Pöhlmann and West divide the hymn up into ten short sections, with frequent changes of key. As in the First Delphic Hymn, the song opens by calling on the Muses to come to Delphi to join in the song in honour of Apollo:

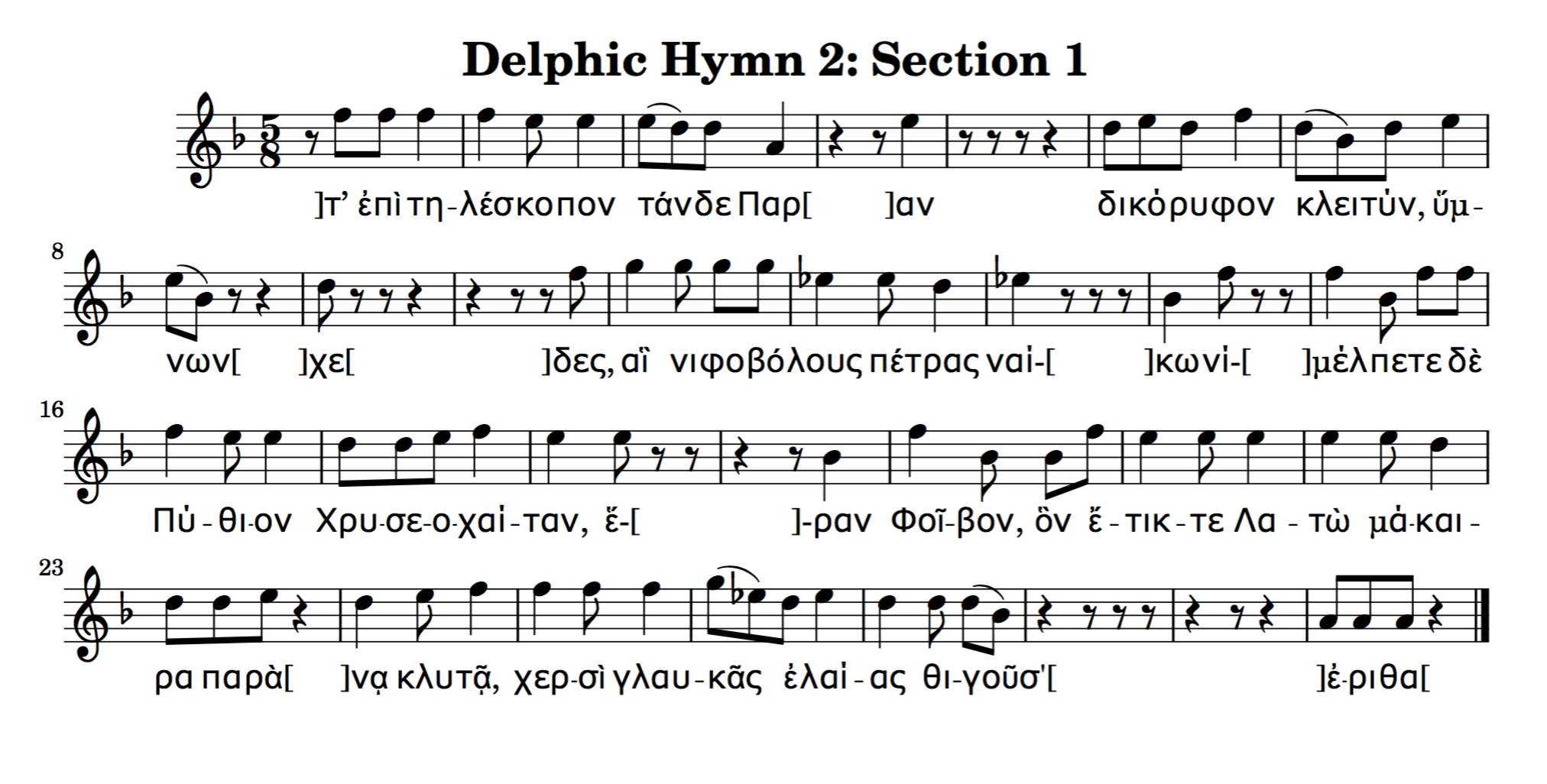
The first section of the Second Delphic Hymn (Limenios Paian) transcribed into modern notation (Places where the stone is broken have been indicated by rests in the music and empty brackets "[ ]" in the lyrics.)

The first verse has been translated by J.G. Landels as follows:

Come ye to this twin-peaked slope of Parnassos with distant views, [where dancers are welcome], and [lead me in my songs], Pierian Goddesses who dwell on the snow-swept crags of Helikon. Sing in honour of Pythian Phoebus, golden-haired, skilled archer and musician, whom blessed Leto bore beside the celebrated marsh, grasping with her hands a sturdy branch of the grey-green olive tree in her time of travail.

The hymn goes on to describe how the sky and sea rejoiced at Apollo's birth on the island of Delos, and how Apollo, after his birth, visited Attica; ever since which time the people of Attica have addressed Apollo as "Paian" (healer) (sections 2–5).

Just as in the first hymn, the singers then address Apollo directly calling on him to come, and remind him how he killed the Python which formerly guarded the Delphic tripod and how he once defeated an army of marauding Gauls with a snowstorm (sections 6–9).

The final part of the work is the prosodion, or processional hymn, with the metre changing from cretic (— ᴗ —, with variants ᴗᴗ ᴗ — and — ᴗ ᴗᴗ) to glyconic (×× — ᴗᴗ — ᴗ —, with variant ×× — ᴗ — ᴗᴗ —). (The symbol ᴗ stands for a short syllable, — for a long one, equal in length to ᴗᴗ, and ×× for variable long-long, long-short, or short-long). In this part, the singers beg Apollo and his sister Artemis ("mistress of Cretan bows") to protect Athens as well as Delphi, and they close with a prayer for the continued dominion of the victorious Roman empire.

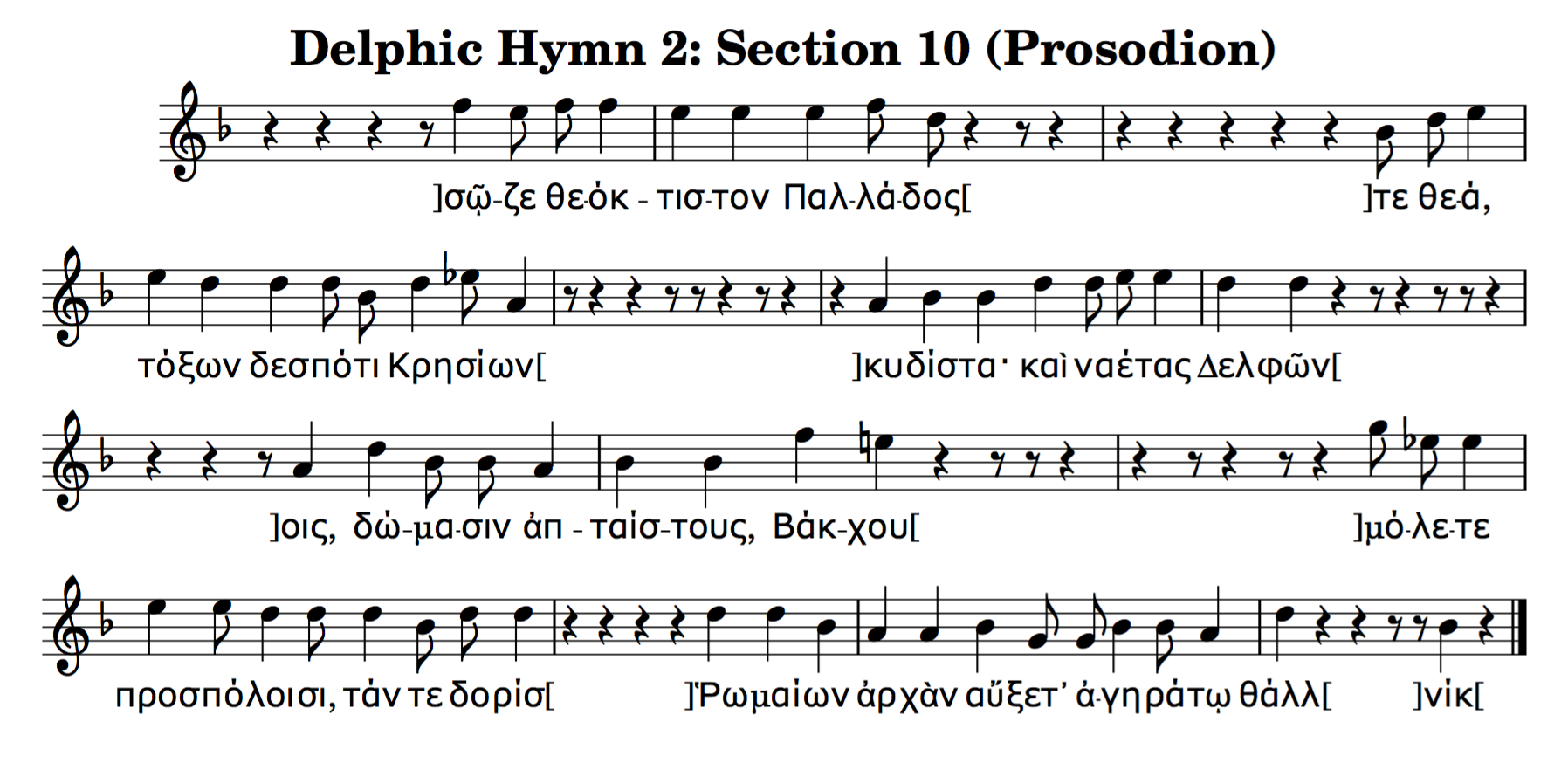
Transcription into modern musical notation of the last section of the Second Delphic Hymn, showing its fragmentary condition. The prayer to "increase the empire of the Romans" is in the last line.

The Second Hymn is composed in a different key from the First Hymn. The central note (mese) of the first section is D (in conventional notation), rather than C, making it the (Greek) Lydian mode. Below the mese are the notes A and B♭, and above it are E, E♭, F, and G.

The notes used in the second section are different from the first section. B♭ is replaced by B♮; E♭ and the top G are not used, and a bottom E and a top A are added, so the range of notes is wider. One way of interpreting this is to assume that the music has moved into the Hypolydian mode. Mostly the melody moves up and down in small steps but there are some big jumps occasionally down to the bottom E.

According to Pöhlmann and West, the modes of the different sections as follows:

1. Lydian
2. Hypolydian
3. Hypolydian
4. Chromatic Lydian
5. Hypolydian
6. Hypolydian
7. Chromatic Lydian
8. Hypolydian
9. Lydian
10. Lydian

== Musical notation ==
The musical symbols used for the hymns can be interpreted thanks to a treatise by Alypius, a musicographer of late antiquity (3rd century AD).

Two different notations of music were used: One notation was simply the 24 letters of the Ionian alphabet, one for each tone (including sharps and half-sharps). The other system was a complicated mix of special symbols, including ordinary letters, upside-down or backwards letters, letters from archaic alphabets, and broken, half-letters; with symbols for more notes it had a much wider tonal range. The first hymn uses the simple letter system; the Second Hymn uses the complicated special symbols. It was normal to use both systems in the same piece of music, both written in separate lines above the lyrics; when both were used, the special symbols were for the instrumental accompaniment, and the plain Ionic alphabet for the vocal part.

A suggested reason for the difference in notation in the two hymns is that the author of the first, Athenaios, is listed as a singer, while the author of the second, Limenios, was a kithara-player. One difference between the two notations is that the symbols in the first hymn are placed above the vowels, while those in the Second Hymn are mostly placed above the consonants which begin the syllables. The instrumental paean is tunable such that all intervals that are performed are pure, while the vocal paean cannot be tuned in such a way, requiring harmonic compromises.

== Aftermath ==
These hymns were thoroughly examined by musicologists and there have been many efforts to perform them with replicas of ancient musical instruments. The first modern public performance of the First Hymn was in June 1894, only one year after its discovery, during the international athletic convention in the Sorbonne University in Paris for the establishment of the modern Olympic Games.

== See also ==
- Musical system of ancient Greece
- Hurrian songs
- Oxyrhynchus hymn
- Seikilos epitaph

== Recordings ==
- Arda Mandikian recorded these fragments at Delphi in 1950
- Bélis, A. (director) et al. (Ensemble Kérylos) (1996). Musiques de l'Antiquité Grecque: De la Pierre au son (audio CD). K617, K617-069.
- Bélis, A. (director, tympanist); Bredewold, Jan Jeroen (baritone); Albou, Frédéric (bass-baritone); Tessé, Benoît (kitharode); Berland, Nathalie (aulete) et al. (Ensemble Kérylos) (2016). D'Euripide aux premiers chrétiens: Musiques de l'antiquité grecque et romaine (audio CD).

Both hymns are performed: The first is sung by baritone Jan Jeroen Bredewold, with tympanist Annie Bélis; the second by bass-baritone Frédéric Albou, with kitharode Benoît Tessé and aulete Nathalie Berland.

- Christodoulos Halaris (conductor) et al. (OP and PO Orchestra) (2013). Music of Ancient Greece (audio CD). Orata. ORANGM.
- Neuman, Gayle Stuwe; Neuman, Philip; Gavin, William et al. (De Organographia) (1997). Music of the Ancient Greeks (audio CD). Pandourion Records. PRDC 1001.
- Paniagua, Gregorio (directed by) et al. (Atrium Musicæ de Madrid) (1979). Musique de la Grèce antique (audio CD). France: Harmonia Mundi. HMA 1901015.
