= Carcinus (writer) =

4th-century BC Greek tragedian

Carcinus (Greek: Καρκίνος; fl. 370s BC) was an Ancient Greek tragedian from Thoricus in southern Attica. He was the son of the playwright Xenocles and grandson of Carcinus. Another Xenocles, mentioned by a scholiast on Aristophanes' Frogs, may have been Carcinus' son.

The Suda records that he wrote one hundred and sixty plays. He won eleven victories at the Dionysia. His exact dates are uncertain, though he was certainly active in the 370s BC. According to the Suda, his floruit was in the 100th Olympiad (380–377 BC); and his first victory at the Dionysia can be dated to before 372. Dionysius II of Syracuse was a patron of Carcinus. Nine or ten titles of his plays are known: Aerope, Ajax, Alope, Amphiaraus, Medea, Oedipus, Orestes, Semele, Thyestes, and possibly Tyro. His work survives only in fragments.

Carcinus is mentioned briefly by Aristotle. In the Poetics, Chapter 17 (1455a lines 22 to 29), Aristotle discusses the necessity for a playwright to see the composition on the stage, rather than just in print, in order to weed out any inconsistencies. Aristotle points to an unnamed play of Carcinus which had a character, Amphiaraus, exit a temple. For some reason this seemed outrageously inconsistent when viewed on the stage, and the audience "hissed" the actors right off the stage.

In 2004, Annie Bélis published a fragment of a musical papyrus written by Carcinus that contains parts of his Medea (Louvre E 10534). It was identified thanks to a quote by Aristotle. It contains two arias, one by Medea and one by Jason. In this version, Medea did not kill her children, but is unable to prove it.
