= Xenocles =

Ancient Greek tragic poet

Xenocles (Ancient Greek: Ξενοκλῆς) was an ancient Greek tragedian. He won a victory at the Dionysia in 415 BC with the plays Oedipus, Lycaon, and Bacchae with the satyr play Athamas. Other plays by Xenocles include Licymnius, parodied by Aristophanes in The Clouds, and perhaps Myes. Aristophanes also refers negatively to Xenocles in the Thesmophoriazusae and Frogs.

Xenocles was the son of Carcinus the Elder and father of Carcinus the Younger, both also tragic playwrights. He had at least two brothers who were also tragic poets or actors. Ancient sources differ on whether Xenocles was one of three or four brothers, and name them variously as Xenotimus, Xenarchus, Demotimus, Xenocleitus, and Datis. Datis, quoted by Aristophanes in Peace, may have been a nickname for Xenocles.
