= Sakadas of Argos =

Sakadas of Argos won a musical competition at the Pythian Games in 586 BC, for Nomos Pythicos, a composition for the aulos that told of the battle between Apollo and Python. This event is one of the earliest known examples of the music of ancient Greece, one of the earliest known accounts of the use of the aulos as a solo instrument, and one of the earliest known accounts of program music.
