= Pythaïs =

Pythaïs was a ritual procession of the Athenians to Delphi, in remembrance of the initial journey of Apollo from Delos to Delphi through Athens.

== Description ==
The Pythaïs was a theoriai, i.e. procession of the Athenians to Delphi. They took place at irregular intervals, usually following specific omens. The Pythaïdes that we know best of were four particularly majestic processions which took place in 138/7, 128/7, 106/5, and 98/7 B.C. They were part of an Athenians effort to link their ancestral myths to the myth of Apollo Pythius.

The starting point of the Pythaïs remains unknown; however the literary sources mention that they were already taking place in the 4th century B.C. It seems that they were interrupted in the 3rd century B.C., but they started again in the 2nd century B.C., in a period when Athens regained its prestige with the generous benefactions of the Hellenistic kings of Asia Minor.

Our main sources for the Pythaïs are the lengthy inscriptions which were carved on the external walls of the Athenian Treasury, recording the names of the participants and other useful detail. As far as literary sources are concerned, the main testimony belongs to Strabo, who mentions Aelius Aristides and Ephoros, as well as the lexicographers. Furthermore, a careful reading of the Delphic Hymns to Apollo illuminates the mythological connections that the Athenians tried to establish. Thus, Apollo is born under an olive tree, the sacred tree of the goddess Athena, a fact which reflects the Athenian supremacy over the Delian League and its treasury. Furthermore, the tragedy Ion by Euripides aims at justifying the worship of Apollo "patroos" in Athens: Kreousa, mother of Ion, falls victim of rape by Apollo. She abandons the newborn in a remote region, from where Hermes, under order of Apollo, transfers him to Delphi, to be brought up by Pythia. The land route between Athens and Delphi is said to have been opened for the purpose of facilitating the Athenians to visit the sanctuary of Apollo. It was said that this road was full of bandits, that Theseus managed to disperse.

== The rituals ==
The exact rituals which took place are mostly unknown. It seems, however, that upon the arrival of the procession to Delphi the participants offered presents to the god, including a tripod. Then a ritual cleansing took place, which was accomplished with the use of fire, which the Athenians took them back to their city by means of a torch. An effort was made to identify the rituals with historic and mythological events, such as the killing of Python, paralleled to the defeat of the Gauls in the 3rd century B.C.

== Bibliography ==
- Tracy, N., "Notes on the Pythais inscriptions", BCH 99, 1975, 215–218
- Bélis, A., Les Hymnes à Apollon, CID III, 1992
- Karila-Cohen, K., 2005,"Apollon, Athènes et la Pythaide: mise en scène mythique de la cite au IIe s. av. J.-C.", Kernos 18, 219–239
