= Annie Bélis =

French archaeologist, philologist, papyrologist and musician

Annie Bélis (born 1951) is a French archaeologist, philologist, papyrologist and musician. She is a research director at the French CNRS, specialized in music from classical antiquity, Ancient Greece and Ancient Rome.

== Career ==
A former student of the École normale supérieure in Sèvres from 1972 to 1975, Bélis passed the agrégation in ancient literature in 1976. Then, Annie Bélis joined the Fondation Thiers from 1979 to 1982. She finished her PhD during her last year at Fondation Thiers and defended it at Paris-Sorbonne University. The same year, she entered the French School at Athens (1982–1986). In 1986, she published her book Aristoxène de Tarente et Aristote; le Traité d'Harmonique for which she received the médaille Georges Perrot from the Académie des Inscriptions et Belles-Lettres. She got her first position at CNRS as tenured Research Scientist (chargée de recherches) in 1986 and is still with CNRS.

She is currently a member of the AOROC laboratory at ENS Ulm.

== Musical studies ==
Annie Bélis learned to play the piano with Yvonne Lefébure, the organ and counterpoint with Arsène Bedois, the flute with Serge Kalisky, and the cello with Jeoffrey Walz.

== Research ==
Annie Bélis produced numerous papers on the music from classical antiquity. They goes from music theory, as her study on the Harmonics of Aristoxenus of Tarentum, rebuilding music instruments (Greek and Roman Kithara, lyre, ...) or musical papyri decryption, as Oxyrhynchus papyrus n°3705, Michigan papyrus n°2958, or Berlin musical papyrus n°6870 where she established that the papyrus contains a Paean to Apollo due written by Mesomedes of Crete. In 2004, she published her work on a papyrus discovered in an unusual way by Laurent Capron, at the time a study engineer at the Institute of Papyrology of the Sorbonne, at the Louvre Museum. She established the papyrus contains a version of Medea written by Carcinos. This version is unusual since here Medea pretends she didn't kill her children unlike in the versions due to Euripides or Seneca.

== Direction of the Ensemble Kérylos ==
At the beginning of the 1990s, Bélis created the Ensemble Kérylos to recreate music as it was during classical antiquity as faithfully as possible. There were three components to this process. First, deciphering musical papyri from antiquity, which she did as part of her scientific work as a papyrologist. Second, reconstructing the ancient instruments needed to play the music, what she did based on archaeological evidence and with the help of French and Spanish luthiers J.-C. Condi and C. Gonzalez. Finally, performing the scores, the reason why she founded the Ensemble Kérylos. In 1996, under her direction, the Ensemble Kérylos recorded a CD: De la pierre au son: Musiques de l'Antiquité grecque et romaine. In 2016, still under the direction of Annie Bélis, the Ensemble Kérylos produced a new recording, D'Euripide aux premiers chrétiens, a new interpretation of the scores of the previous CD taking into account progress in academic research in the field. This CD has the first recording of the "Roman Kithara" reconstructed by Annie Bélis and Carlos Gonzalez and the "Paean to Apollo" written by Mesomedes of Crete in its corrected edition.

== Bibliography ==
- Annie Bélis, Aristoxène de Tarente et Aristote : le " Traité d'Harmonique ", Paris, Klincksieck, coll. " Études et commentaires ", vol. C, 1986.
- Annie Bélis, Les musiciens dans l'Antiquité, Paris, Hachette-Littératures, coll. " La vie quotidienne ", 1999.
