= Lydian mode =

Seven-tone musical scale

The modern Lydian mode is a seven-tone musical scale formed from a rising pattern of pitches comprising three whole tones, a semitone, two more whole tones, and a final semitone.

Because of the importance of the major scale in modern music, the Lydian mode is often described as the scale that begins on the fourth scale degree of the major scale, or alternatively, as the major scale with the fourth scale degree raised half a step. This sequence of pitches roughly describes the scale underlying the fifth of the eight Gregorian (church) modes, known as Mode V or the authentic mode on F, theoretically using B♮ but in practice more commonly featuring B♭. The use of the B♭ as opposed to B♮ would have made such piece in the modern-day F major scale.

== Ancient Greek Lydian ==
The name Lydian refers to the ancient kingdom of Lydia in Anatolia. In Greek music theory, there was a Lydian scale or "octave species" extending from parhypate hypaton to trite diezeugmenon, equivalent in the diatonic genus to the modern Ionian mode (the major scale).

In the chromatic and enharmonic genera, the Lydian scale was equivalent to C D♭ E F G♭ A B C, and C C E F F A B C, respectively, where "" signifies raising the pitch by approximately a quarter tone.

== Medieval Lydian mode ==
In the Middle Ages and Renaissance, this mode was described in two ways. The first way is the diatonic octave species from F up to F an octave above, divided at C to produce two segments:

The second is as a mode with a final on F and an ambitus extending to F an octave higher and in which the note C was regarded as having an important melodic function. Many theorists of the period observed that B♭ is used more typically than B♮ in compositions in Lydian mode.

== Modern Lydian mode ==
The Lydian scale can be described as a major scale with the fourth scale degree raised a semitone, making it an augmented fourth above the tonic; e.g., an F-major scale with a B♮ rather than B♭. That is, the Lydian mode has the following formula:

1, 2, 3, ♯4, 5, 6, 7, 8

This mode's augmented fourth and the Locrian mode's diminished fifth are the only modes to have a tritone above the tonic.

In Lydian mode, the tonic, dominant, and supertonic triads are all major. The subdominant is diminished. The triads built on the remaining three scale degrees are minor.

Alternatively, it can be written as the pattern

whole, whole, whole, half, whole, whole, half or (W-W-W-H-W-W-H)

== Notable compositions in the Lydian mode ==
=== Classical (Ancient Greek) ===
The Paean and Prosodion to the God, familiarly known as the Second Delphic Hymn, composed in 128 BC by Athénaios Athenaíou is predominantly in the Lydian tonos, both diatonic and chromatic, with sections also in Hypolydian.

=== Romantic ===
A rare, extended use of the Lydian mode in the Classical repertoire is Simon Sechter's 1822 Messe in der lydischen Tonart (Mass in the Lydian Mode). A more famous example from around the same time is the third movement of Ludwig van Beethoven's String Quartet No. 15 in A minor, Op. 132 (1825), titled by the composer "Heiliger Dankgesang eines Genesenen an die Gottheit, in der lydischen Tonart" ("Holy Song of Thanksgiving by a Convalescent to the Divinity, in the Lydian Mode"). The alternating passages in F use the Lydian scale with sharp fourth scale degree exclusively.

Anton Bruckner employed the sharpened fourth of the Lydian scale in his motet Os justi (1879) more strictly than Renaissance composers ever did when writing in this mode.

=== Modern ===
In the 20th century, composers began once again to exploit modal scales with some frequency. George Enescu, for example, includes Lydian-mode passages in the second and third movements of his 1906 Decet for Winds, Op. 14. An example from the middle of the century is the scherzo movement of Carlos Chávez's Symphony No. 3 (1951–54). The movement opens with a fugue subject, featuring extremely wide leaps, in C Lydian with following entries in F and G Lydian. Alexei Stanchinsky wrote a Prelude in Lydian mode earlier in the 20th century.

=== Jazz ===
In Lydian Chromatic Concept of Tonal Organization, George Russell developed a theory that became highly influential in the jazz world, inspiring the works of people such as Miles Davis, John Coltrane, Ornette Coleman, and Woody Shaw.

=== Popular ===
In practical terms it should be said that few rock songs that use modes such as the phrygian, Lydian, or locrian actually maintain a harmony rigorously fixed on them. What usually happens is that the scale is harmonized in [chords with perfect] fifths and the riffs are then played [over] those [chords].

- "Blue Jay Way" (1967) by the Beatles
- "Peregrine" (1968) by Donovan
- Sequence beginning at the words "Much as I definitely enjoy solitude" in "Possibly Maybe" (1996) by Björk
- "Waltz #1" (1998) by Elliott Smith (D♭ Lydian)

=== Folk ===
- Many Polish folksongs, including the mazurka, are in the Lydian mode; the first six notes of this mode were sometimes known as the "Polish mode".

== See also ==
- Lydian chord, a chord that is related to the Lydian scale
- Lydian dominant scale
- Kalyani (raga), the equivalent scale (melakarta) in Carnatic music

== Notes ==
=== Sources ===
- Anon. n.d. "Frequently Asked Questions about George Russell's Lydian Chromatic Concept of Tonal Organization". www.georgerussell.com (Accessed 23 February 2012).
- Barbera, André. 1984. "Octave Species". The Journal of Musicology 3, no. 3 (July): 229–241. JSTOR 763813 (Subscription access). doi:10.1525/jm.1984.3.3.03a00020
- Barker, Andrew. 1984–1989. Greek Musical Writings. 2 vols. Cambridge Readings in the Literature of Music. Cambridge and New York: Cambridge University Press.
- Carver, Anthony F. 2005. "Bruckner and the Phrygian Mode". Music & Letters 86, no. 1:74–99. doi:10.1093/ml/gci004 (Subscription access).
- Hein, Ethan. 2012. "The Major Scale Modes". Ethan Hein's Blog: Music, Technology, Evolution (Accessed 26 January 2012).
- Hoffman, Alfred, and Adrian Rațiu. 1971. "Succese ale simfonistului (1900–1906)". In George Enescu: Monografie, 2 vols., edited by Mircea Voicana, 237–329. Bucharest: Editura Academiei Republicii Socialiste România.
- Orbón, Julián. 1987. "Las sinfonías de Carlos Chávez." (part 2). Pauta: Cuadernos de teoría y crítica musical 6, no. 22 (April–June): 81–91.
- Pöhlmann, Egert, and Martin L. West. 2001. Documents of Ancient Greek Music: The Extant Melodies and Fragments, edited and transcribed with commentary by Egert Pöhlmann and Martin L. West. Oxford: Clarendon Press. ISBN 0-19-815223-X.
- Powers, Harold S. 2001. "Lydian". The New Grove Dictionary of Music and Musicians, second edition, edited by Stanley Sadie and John Tyrrell, 15:409–410. 29 vols. London: Macmillan. ISBN 978-1-56159-239-5 (set) ISBN 978-0-19-517067-2 (set) OCLC 44391762 (set) OCLC 248649842 (v. 15) OCLC 249589729 (v. 15, reprint with minor corr.) LCCN 00-55156 or 00055156 (set).
- Preston, William. 2012, p. 25. "Funk Pop a Roll : The Stylistic Evolution of XTC". Portland, Oregon: Lewis and Clark College.
- Smith, Ronald. 2000. Alkan, the Man, the Music. London: Kahn & Averill. ISBN 9781871082739.
- Prelude in Lydian Mode (1908, Stanchinsky, Aleksey): Scores at the International Music Score Library Project
- Trochimczyk, Maja. n.d. "Mazur (Mazurka)". University of Southern California Polish Music Center website (accessed 12 November 2018).
