= Limenius =

Ancient Athenian composer (fl. 2nd century BC)

Limenius (Ancient Greek: Λιμήνιος; fl. 2nd century BC) was an Athenian composer of paeans and prosodia. As creator of the Second Delphic Hymn in 128 BC, he is the earliest known composer in recorded history for a surviving piece of music, or one of the two earliest, or the second-earliest, depending first on whether one accepts the proposition of Bélis, that the composer of the First Delphic Hymn is named Athenaeus and, second, whether that hymn was composed in the same year as the Second Hymn, or ten years earlier. Limenius was a performer on the kithara and, as a professional musician performing in the Pythaïs (the liturgical embassy to the cult centre of Pythian Apollo at Delphi), he was required to belong to one of the guilds of the Artists of Dionysus.
