= Hartmann of Saint Gall =

Hartmann (born before 895; died 21 September 925) was abbot of the Benedictine Abbey of Saint Gall.

== Abbacy ==
Hartmann was elected abbot in 922. He was the successor to Abbot Solomon III, following one year of interregnum. He appears as deacon in the monk's register as early as 895. In 897 he appears as a document scribe, from 910 to 912 he appears four times as camerarius and in 920 as provost. His tenure as abbot is only attested in one imprecisely dated document. It is entered in a list of abbots as lasting for three years and four months.

== Works ==
Ekkehart, later abbot and an important historian of the abbey, reports that Hartmann was focussed on the monastic and scientific aspects of life in the abbey. He seems to have been particularly concerned with the school and singing of chorales. However, Ekkehart also says that he neglected the administration of the abbey goods, to the detriment of the abbey.

He is thought to be the author of a lost piece about the history of his times. The hymns of an eponymous author were likely not written by Hartmann of Saint Gall.

== See also ==
- Gerold Meyer von Knonau (1879). "Hartmann, Abt von St. Gallen". Allgemeine Deutsche Biographie (in German). Vol. 10. Leipzig: Duncker & Humblot. p. 678.
- Hartmann in German, French and Italian in the online Historical Dictionary of Switzerland.

Preceded by Solomon III	Abbot of St. Gallen; 922–925	Succeeded by Engilbert
