= Mesomedes =

Greek citharode and lyric poet (2nd century AD )

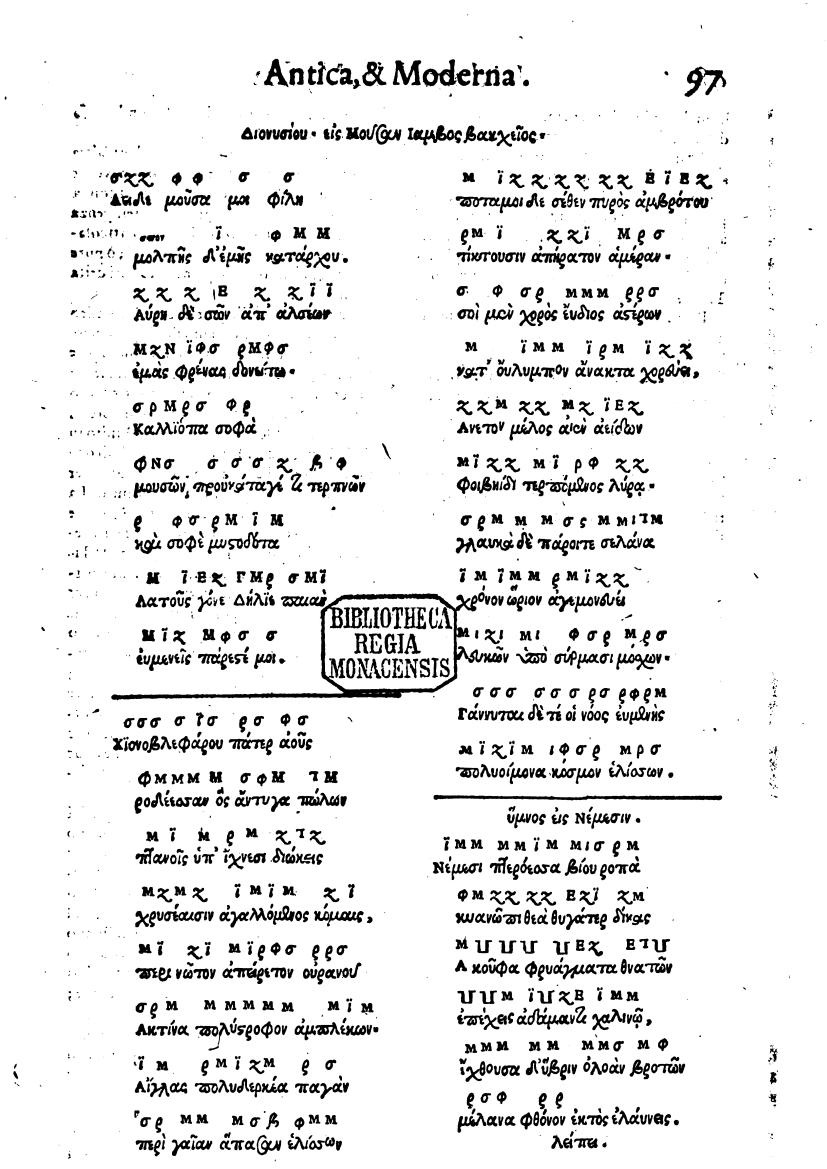
The page on Vincenzo Galilei's book (Dialogo della musica antica e della moderna), that shows the three hymns of Mesomedes

Mesomedes of Crete (Ancient Greek: Μεσομήδης ὁ Κρής) was a Greek citharode and lyric poet and composer of the early 2nd century AD in Roman Greece. Prior to the discovery of the Seikilos epitaph in the late 19th century, the hymns of Mesomedes were the only surviving written music from the ancient world. Three were published by Vincenzo Galilei in his Dialogo della musica antica e della moderna (Florence, 1581), during a period of intense investigation into music of the ancient Greeks. These hymns had been preserved through the Byzantine tradition (Anthol. pal. xiv. 63, xvi. 323), and were presented to Vincenzo by Girolamo Mei.

== Life and career ==
He was a freedman of the Emperor Hadrian, on whose favorite Antinous he is said to have written a panegyric, specifically called a Citharoedic Hymn (Suda). Two epigrams by him in the Greek Anthology (Anthol. pal. xiv. 63, xvi. 323) are extant, and a hymn to Nemesis. The hymn is one of four which preserve the ancient musical notation written over the text. Two hymns formerly assigned to Dionysius of Alexandria, one to the muse Calliope and one entitled Hymn to the Sun, have also been attributed to Mesomedes. In an article published in 2003, Annie Bélis proves that the Berlin musical papyrus (inv. 6870) contains a Paean to Apollo written by Mesomedes. A total of 15 poems by Mesomedes are known.

Mesomedes continued in the Musaeum in Alexandria even after Hadrian's death (138); there the Historia Augusta reports that during Antoninus Pius' reign (138–161) his state salary was reduced. The emperor Caracalla (212–217) honored Mesomedes with a cenotaph approximately 50 to 60 years after his death.

See J. F. Bellermann, Die Hymnen des Dionysius und Mesomedes (1840); C. de Jan, Musici scriptores graeci (1899); S. Reinach in Revue des études grecques, ix (1896); Suda s.v.

== Hymns ==
=== Prayer to the Muse ===
The dialect of this hymn is different from the others (Ionian rather than Doric), and the style is also slightly different; for this reason J.G. Landels believes that it is probably not by Mesomedes.

Ἄειδε μοῦσά μοι φίλη,
μολπῆς δ’ ἐμῆς κατάρχου·
αὔρη δὲ σῶν ἀπ’ ἀλσέων
ἐμὰς φρένας δονείτω.

Sing to me, kind Muse,
and begin my song.
Send a breeze from your groves
to stir my mind.

=== Prayer to Calliope and Apollo ===
Καλλιόπεια σοφά,
μουσῶν προκαθαγέτι τερπνῶν,
καὶ σοφὲ μυστοδότα,
Λατοῦς γόνε, Δήλιε, Παιάν,
εὐμενεῖς πάρεστέ μοι.

Wise Calliope,
leader of the delight-making Muses,
and skilful initiator into the mysteries,
son of Leto, Delian Paean,
favor me with your presence.

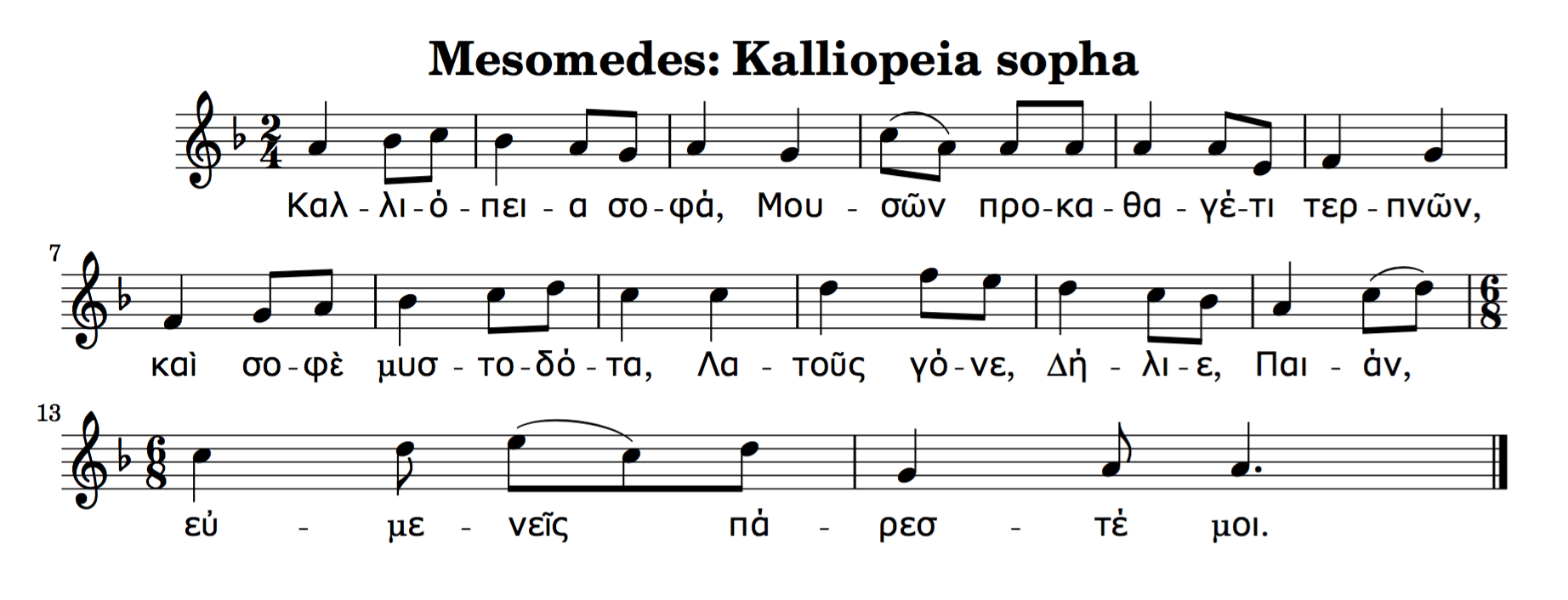
Mesomedes' Prayer to Calliope transcribed into modern musical notation; adapted from Landels, John G. 1999. Music in Ancient Greece and Rome, p. 255.

=== Hymn to the Sun ===
Χιονοβλεφάρου πάτερ Ἀοῦς,
ῥοδόεσσαν ὃς ἄντυγα πώλων
πτανοῖς ὑπ’ ἴχνεσσι διώκεις,
χρυσέαισιν ἀγαλλόμενος κόμαις,
περὶ νῶτον ἀπείριτον οὐρανοῦ
ἀκτῖνα πολύστροφον ἀμπλέκων,
αἴγλας πολυδερκέα πάναν
περὶ γαῖαν ἅπασαν ἑλίσσων.
ποταμοὶ δὲ σέθεν πυρὸς ἀμβρότου
τίκτουσιν ἐπήρατον ἁμέραν.

σοὶ μὲν χορὸς εὔδιος ἀστέρων
κατ’ Ὄλυμπον ἄνακτα χορεύει,
ἄνετον μέλος αἰὲν ἀείδων,
Φοιβηΐδι τερπόμενος λύρᾳ.
γλαυκὰ δὲ πάροιθε Σελάνα
χρόνον ὥριον ἁγεμονεύει,
λευκῶν ὑπὸ σύρμασι μόσχων.
γάνυται δέ τέ σοι νόος εὐμενὴς
πολυείμονα κόσμον ἑλίσσων.

Father of the Dawn with her snow-white eyelids,
you who follow in your rose-pink chariot
the track of your flying steeds,
exulting in the gold of your hair,
twining your darting rays
across the boundless vault of sky,
whirling around the whole earth
the thread of your all-seeing beams,
while flowing rivers of your deathless fire
beget the lovely day.

For you the peaceful chorus of stars
dance their measure across Olympos their lord,
forever singing their leisured song,
rejoicing in the music of Apollo’s lyre;
and leading them the silvery-grey Moon
marshals the months and seasons,
drawn by her team of milk-white heifers.
And your benevolent mind rejoices
as it whirls around the manifold raiment of the universe.

The metre of the hymn is known as the apokroton, a metre of anapaestic character popular in the 2nd and 3rd centuries AD. The first two lines are paroemiac, which is the same metre, but where the antepenultimate syllable is lengthened in the music to take up the space of – u:

uu – u u – u u – u – (apokroton)
uu – u u – u u –u – (paroemiac)

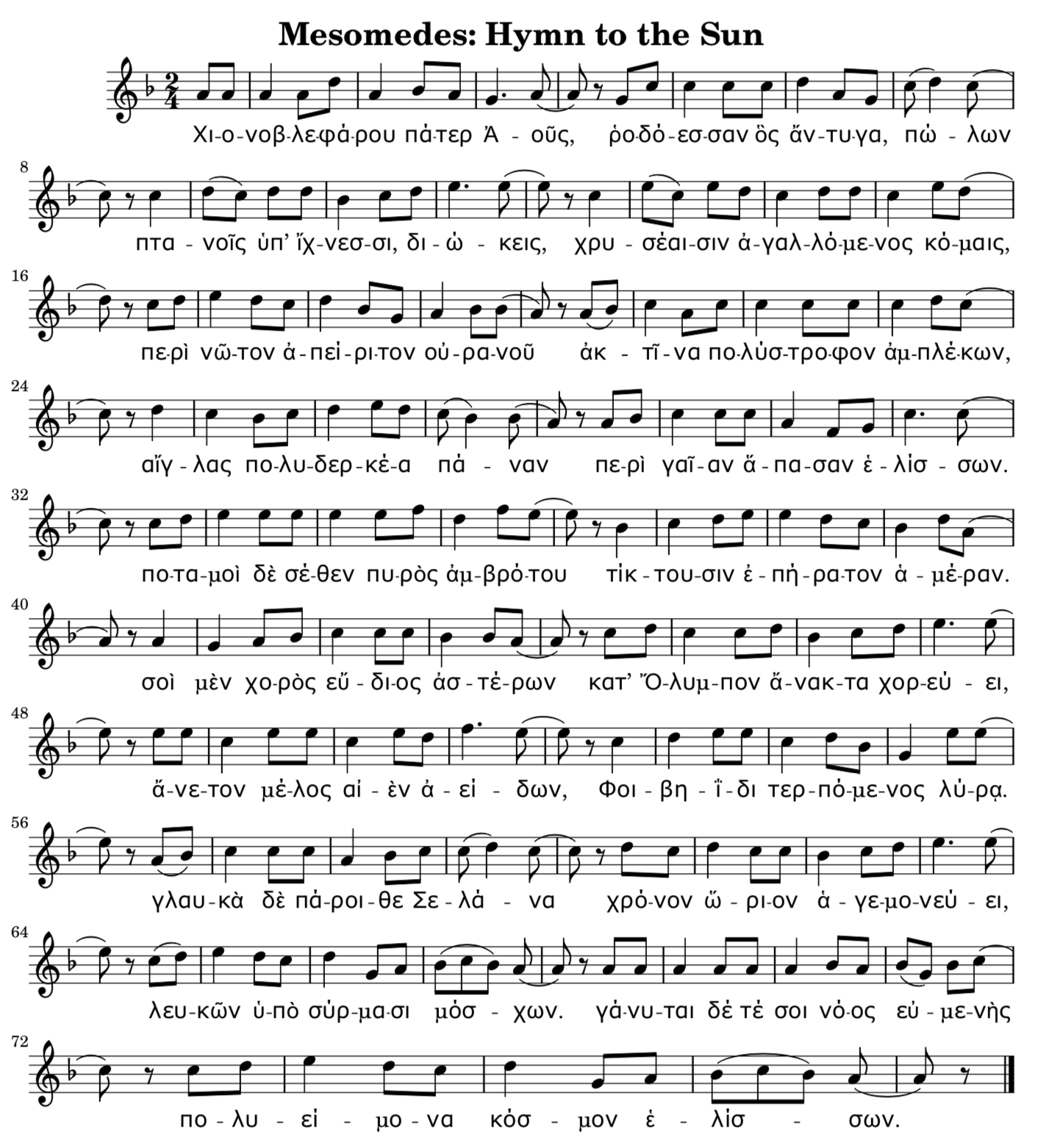
The music for Mesomedes' Hymn to the Sun, according to Pöhlmann & West (2001), but divided into 2/4 time following Landels (1999).
