= Paean =

Song or poem expressing triumph or gratitude

A paean or pean (/ˈpiːən/) is a song or lyric poem expressing triumph or thanksgiving. In classical antiquity, it is usually performed by a chorus, but some examples seem intended for an individual voice (monody). It comes from the Greek παιάν/paian (also παιήων/paeion or παιών/paion), "song of triumph, any solemn song or chant". "Paeon" (paian), which originally referred to a distinct deity of healing. Historical evidence from Linear B tablets (notably the name Pa-ja-wo-ne found at Knossos) suggests that Paean was an independent, pre-Olympian god of healing in the Mycenaean period. In the Homeric epics, Paean remains a separate figure from Apollo, serving as the personal physician to the gods who heals the wounds of Ares and Hades. Over time, the cult of Apollo absorbed Paean's identity and healing attributes. By the Archaic period, "Paean" became a major epithet for Apollo (Apollo Paean),

== Etymology ==
The basis of the word παιάν is *παιάϝων." Its ultimate etymology is unclear. R. S. P. Beekes has suggested the meaning "who heals illnesses through magic", from *παῖϝα/*παϝία "blow", related to παίω "beat" (from Proto-Indo-European *ph_{2}u-ie/o-) or παύω "withhold" (of uncertain etymology). He alternatively suggested that paian "may well be Pre-Greek".

== Ancient Greek paean ==
In Homer, Paeon was the Greek physician of the gods. In Iliad V he heals the wounded Ares and Hades with his herbal lore. In time Paeon (or Paean) became an epithet ("byname") of Apollo as a god capable of bringing disease and propitiated as a god of healing. Hesiod identifies Paeon as a separate god, and in later poetry Paeon is invoked independently as a health god. Later, Paean becomes a byname of Asclepius, another healer-god.

The earliest appearances of a paean or hymn of thanksgiving also appear in the Iliad. After the prayer to avert evil from the Achaeans, a paean is sung. In an almost identical line (X.391) that suggests a formulaic expression, Achilles tells the Myrmidons to sing the paean after the death of Hector.

Previously, L. R. Farnell had referred to the ancient association between the healing craft and the singing of spells, but found it impossible to decide which was the original sense. At all events the meaning of "healer" gradually gave place to that of "hymn", from the phrase "Ἰὴ Παιάν" or "Ἰὼ Παιάν".

Such songs were originally addressed to Apollo, and afterwards to other gods, like Dionysus, Helios, and Asclepius. About the 4th century the paean became merely a formula of adulation; its object was either to implore protection against disease and misfortune, or to offer thanks after such protection had been rendered. Its connection with Apollo as the slayer of the Python led to its association with battle and victory; hence it became the custom for a paean to be sung by an army on the march and before entering into battle, when a fleet left the harbour, and also after a victory had been won.

The Greek poet Aeschylus who took part in the Battle of Salamis, commented on the power of the paean over enemies (in this case the Persians):

All the barbarians felt fear because they had been deprived of what they expected. The Greeks were singing the stately paean at that time not for flight, but because they were hastening into battle and were stout of heart.

A paean was sung before the resumption of the naval battle between the Corcyraeans and Corinthians in a war leading up to the Peloponnesian War, implying that it might have been a common practice. In addition, the paean is said to have been sung just before the start of various battles (including the Battle of Cunaxa) in Xenophon's "Anabasis" (or "Persian Expedition").

== In Greek poetry and music ==
The most famous paeans are those of Bacchylides and Pindar. Paeans were sung at the festivals of Apollo (especially the Hyacinthia), at banquets, and later even at public funerals. In later times they were addressed not only to the gods, but to human beings. In this manner the Rhodians celebrated Ptolemy I of Egypt, the Samians Lysander of Sparta, the Athenians Demetrius, the Delphians Craterus of Macedon.

Musically, the paean was a choral ode, and originally had an antiphonal character, in which a leader sang in a monodic style, with the chorus responding with a simple, informal phrase; however, later in its development, the paean was an entirely choral form. Typically the paean was in the Dorian mode (note that the Ancient Greek Dorian was different from the modern Dorian mode; see musical mode), and was accompanied by the kithara, which was Apollo's instrument. Paeans meant to be sung on the battlefield were accompanied by aulos and kithara.

Two musical fragments of paeans survive from late antiquity: one by Athénaios Athenaíou" (Athenaios son of Athenaios), the other by Limenius of Athens. The fragment by Limenius has been dated to 128 BC; the one by Athenaios may have been composed in the same year, or ten years earlier.

== Modern usage ==
Paean is now usually used to mean an expression of praise or exultation (such as its coining in the redundant expression "paeans of praise"). A song called "Paean" was used in a Chinese propaganda film called The East Is Red.

=== USS Pueblo confession ===
After being captured by North Korea in 1968, the commander of USS Pueblo, Lloyd M. Bucher, used "paean" (read 'pee on', i.e. urinate on) as a code that his confession was forced. Under threat of death, Bucher agreed to "confess to his and the crew's transgression" in his own hand, and included the phrase "We paean the DPRK [North Korea]. We paean their great leader Kim Il Sung".

== Sources ==
- Parts of this entry are originally from the 1911 Encyclopædia Britannica.
