= Athenaeus (musician) =

Ancient Greek composer and musician

Athenaeus, son of Athenaeus (Greek: Ἀθήναιος) was an ancient Greek (Athenian) composer and musician who flourished around 138–128 BC, when he composed the First Delphic Hymn. Although it was long thought that the composer of the First Hymn was merely "an Athenian", careful reading of the inscription shows that it cannot be the ethnic Athenaîos (from Athens), but rather names Athénaios Athenaíou (Athenaeus, son of Athenios) as the composer.
