= Tetrapyrgia (disambiguation) =

Tetrapyrgia is a genus of moths.

Tetrapyrgia (Ancient Greek: Τετραπυργία) may also refer to:

- Tetrapyrgia (Cappadocia), town of ancient Cappadocia
- Tetrapyrgia (Pamphylia), town of ancient Pamphylia
