= Apollo and Marsyas =

Apollo and Marsyas is the name of the following paintings:

- Apollo and Daphnis, also known as Apollo and Marsyas, a c. 1483 painting by Pietro Perugino
- Apollo and Marsyas (Giordano, Naples), a 1959–1960 oil-on-canvas painting by Luca Giordano in the museo nazionale di Capodimonte, Naples
- Apollo and Marsyas (Giordano, Moscow), a c. 1665 oil-on-canvas painting by Luca Giordano in the Pushkin Museum, Moscow
- Apollo and Marsyas (Ribera), a 1637 painting by José de Ribera

== See also ==
- Landscape with Apollo and Marsyas, a c. 1639 oil-on-canvas painting by Claude Lorrain
