= Apollo and Marsyas (Ribera, Naples) =

Painting by Jusepe de Ribera

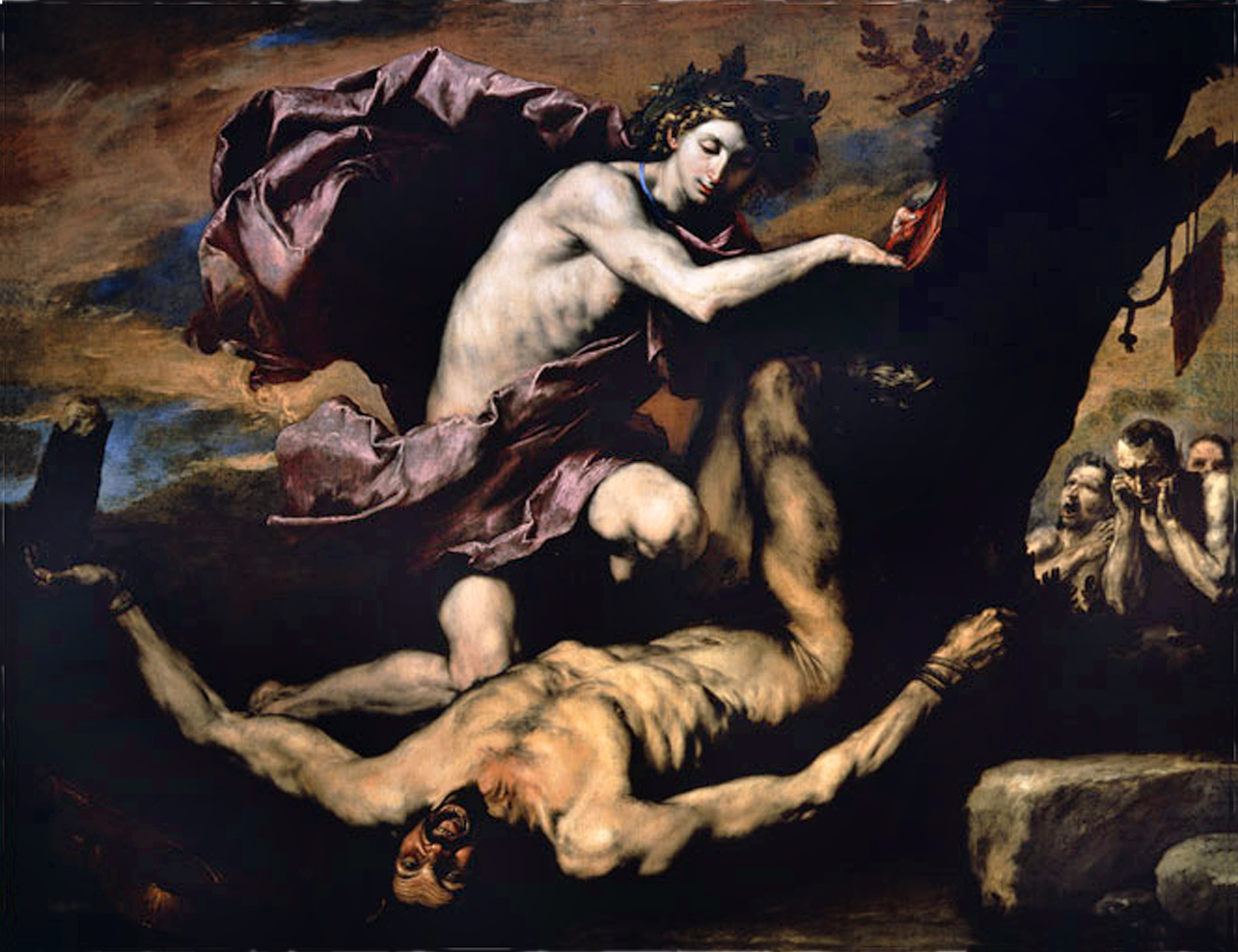
Apollo and Marsyas (1637) by Jusepe de Ribera

Apollo and Marsyas is a 1637 oil on canvas painting by Jusepe de Ribera, now in the Museo nazionale di Capodimonte in Naples. Heavily influenced by Caravaggio, he produced another version, also in 1637, now in the Royal Museums of Fine Arts of Belgium in Brussels.

Signed and dated at the bottom right, Ribera's painting shows his full mature style, combining the crude and immediate Caravaggist realism with 17th century Neapolitan tenebrism with its accentuation of dramatic and violent figures. With his bad teeth visible, Marsyas turns to the viewer, making us witnesses to his pleas for mercy, whilst Apollo opens a deep wound with no facial expression beyond perhaps a subtle smile. The lyre and panpipes are hung up at the right above three fellow satyrs. The use of colour is particularly fine, reaching its apex in Apollo's robe, the sky and Marsyas' body.

== Subject ==
It shows a passage in Ovid's Metamorphoses in which - after winning a musical contest against the satyr Marsyas - the god of music Apollo flays the loser. According to that work Athena had invented the panpipes but was then mocked by Eros for puffing out her cheeks and reddening her face whilst playing it and so dropped the instrument down to earth, where Marsyas found it and got so good at playing it that he thought he was a better player than Apollo. He was challenged to a contest by the god and - though it initially ended in a draw - Apollo then cunningly suggested playing their instruments backwards, which made a sound on his lyre but not on Marsyas' panpipes. That defeat then resulted in the flaying, with Marsyas' tears forming the river that bears his name.

== History ==
=== Origins ===
The work is first recorded in a catalogue of the Avalos collection dating between 1650 and 1700, on the occasion of it passing from the collection of Giovanni d'Avalos, probably the commissioner, to his son Andrea di Montesarchio. It was one of several works on the subject by Ribera - in his 1630 or 1634 Il Forastiero Giulio Cesare Capaccio mentions a work by Ribera on that subject at Gaspar Roomer's private Villa Bisignano at the gates of Naples, probably his very first treatment of it.

It is still uncertain whether the work now in the Capodimonte was part of the Roomer collection, as both the version in Naples and another 1637 autograph version now in the Royal Museums of Fine Arts of Belgium post-date Capaccio's text. The most probable theory is that the Flemish patron owned another now lost or unattributed version of Apollog and Marsyas by Ribera, probably contemporary with his Drunken Silenus, also now in Naples.

=== Related works ===
Another of Ribera's 1637 works is also drawn from Metamorphoses, namely Venus and Adonis, now in the galleria di palazzo Corsini in Rome, which strongly relates to the Naples and Brussels works, suggesting the three works were part of the same commission. Recorded in Gaspar Roomer's house, a c.1630 work by the artist on the subject is probably the prototype for both the Naples and Brussels works. A work by his pupil Antonio De Bellis on the subject is in a museum in Sarasota. The Brussels version is slightly larger than the Naples one and has an Apollo in profile and a pink robe (rather than face on and in a purple robe as in Naples), but otherwise is very similar to it.

It is unknown why Ribera painted several works on the same subject at the same time or whether some or all of them were for the same or related patrons. However, it is still possible to theorise that the painter completed the (probably lost) work mentioned in Roomer's collection and it immediately proved so successful that other patrons wanted a work on the same subject and that these patrons were either based in Naples (perhaps the origin of the Capodimonte work) or lived abroad but had been able to admire the Roomer collection work (a possible origin for the Brussels work). One potential candidate for a non-Naples commissioner is Ferdinand van den Eynde, a friend of Roomer's and like him an art dealer and collector active in Naples, who is known to have commissioned from Giordano a copy of his Apollo and Marsyas, which was in van den Eynde's collection on his death in 1688.

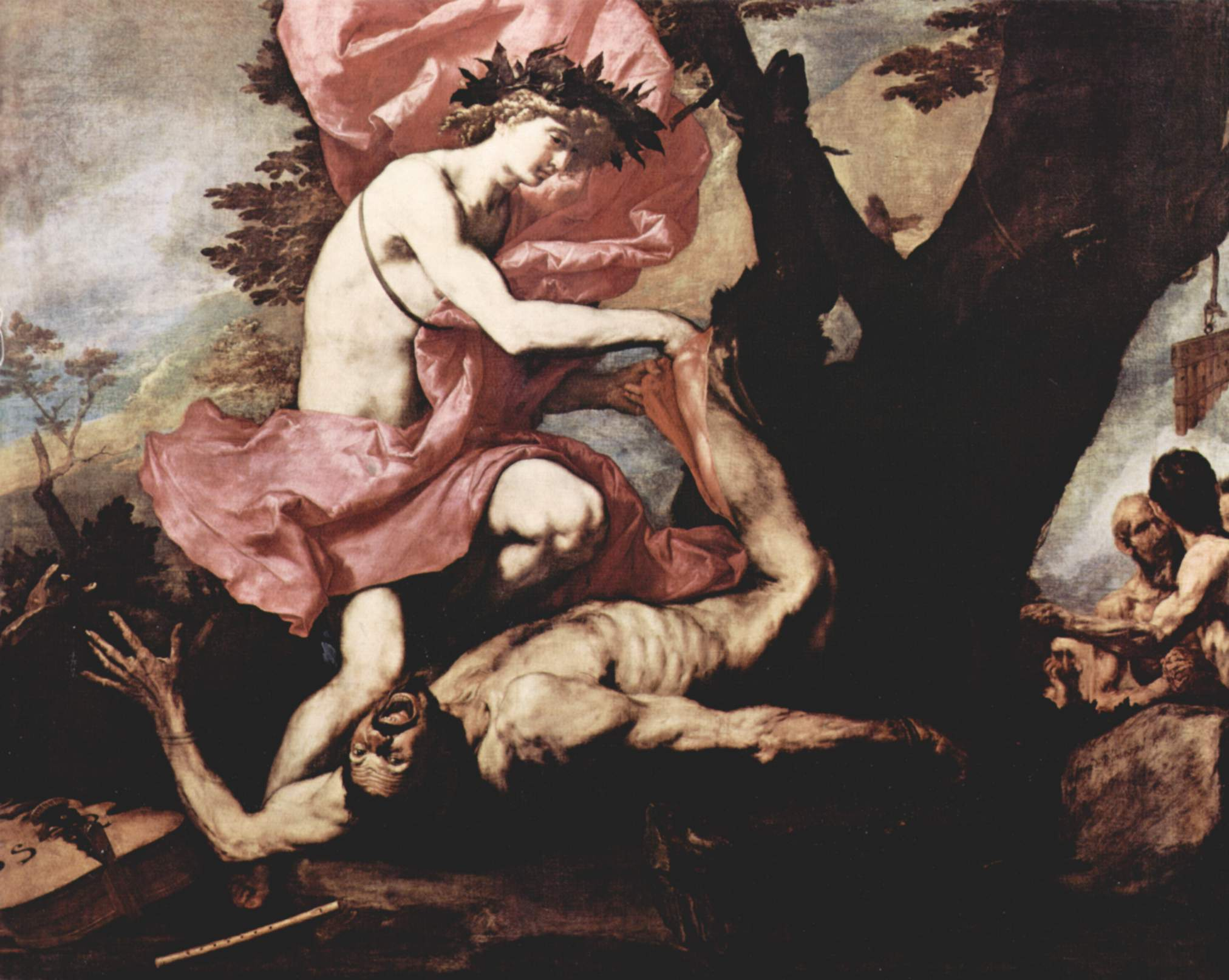
Apollo and Marsyas (1637, Ribera - Brussels version)

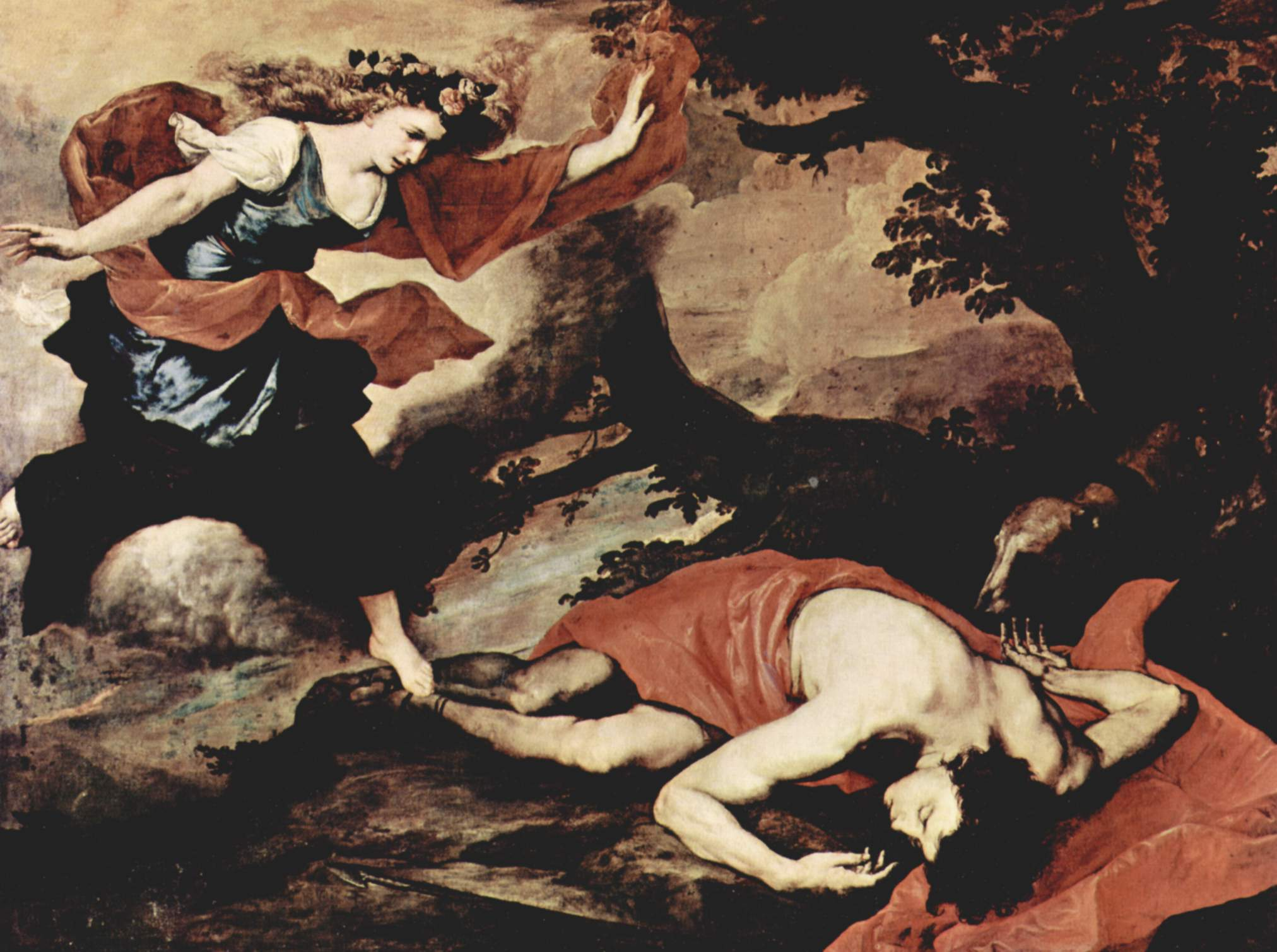
Venus and Adonis (1637, Ribera - Museo di Palazzo Corsini, Roma)

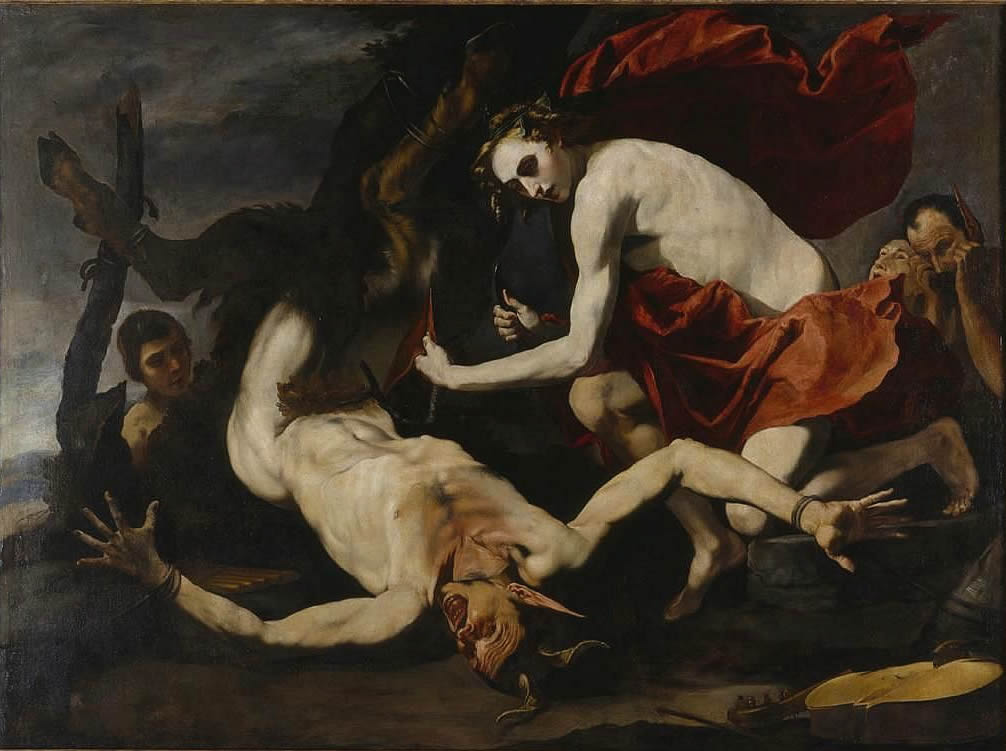
Apollo and Marsyas (1637–40, Antonio De Bellis (attr.) - Museum of Art, Sarasota)

=== Influence on Giordano ===
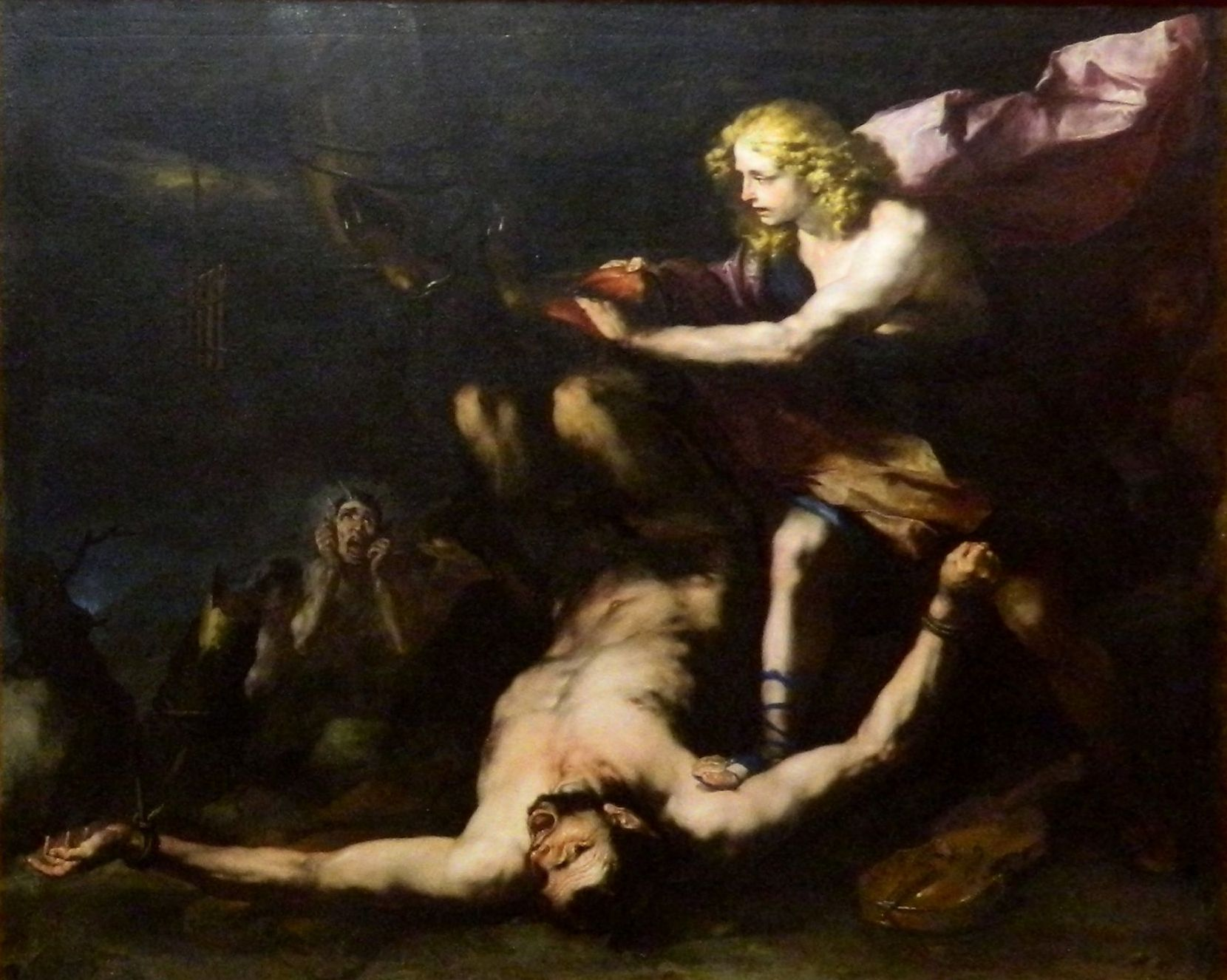
Apollo and Marsyas (1659–60, Luca Giordano - Museo di Capodimonte, Naples)

The Brussels and Naples works proved a major influence on Ribera's pupil Luca Giordano's 1659-1660 treatment of the subject, though Giordano's is in darker tones and quicker and more nuanced brushstrokes as learned during Giordano's time in Venice. Both are built on diagonal compositions, both have scattered satyrs in the background, both show Marsyas screaming, both have the two musical instruments at the top end of a diagonal, both show the start of the flaying, both show Apollo in the foreground in a purple robe, both show Marsyas' legs tied to the tree.

=== Later history ===
Apollo and Marsyas remained in the Avalos collection in Naples until 1862, when Alfonso V d'Avalos gave it to the newly-unified Italian state. It was then valued at 800 ducats, at that date the highest value of any single work in the collection (though each of the tapestries in the Battle of Pavia was valued at 5,500 ducats). From 1957 to the early 1990s it and Giordano's version were exhibited at the Certosa di San Martino, before being moved to the Capodimonte.

== Bibliography (in Italian) ==
- Archivio storico per le province napoletane, Napoli, edited by the Società napoletana di storia e patria, 2015.
- Museo di Capodimonte, Milano, Touring Club Italiano, 2012, ISBN 978-88-365-2577-5.
- Pierluigi Leone De Castris, I tesori dei d'Avalos: committenza e collezionismo di una grande famiglia napoletana, Napoli, Casa editrice Fausto Fiorentino, 1994.
- O. Ferrari e G. Scavizzi, Luca Giordano. L'opera completa, Electa, Napoli.
- N. Spinosa, Ribera. L'opera completa, Electa, Napoli 2003.
