= Hyagnis =

Hyagnis may refer to:

- Hyagnis (beetle), a genus of insects in the family Cerambycidae
- Hyagnis (mythology), a Phrygian musician
