= Apollo and Marsyas (Giordano, Naples) =

Painting by Luca Giordano

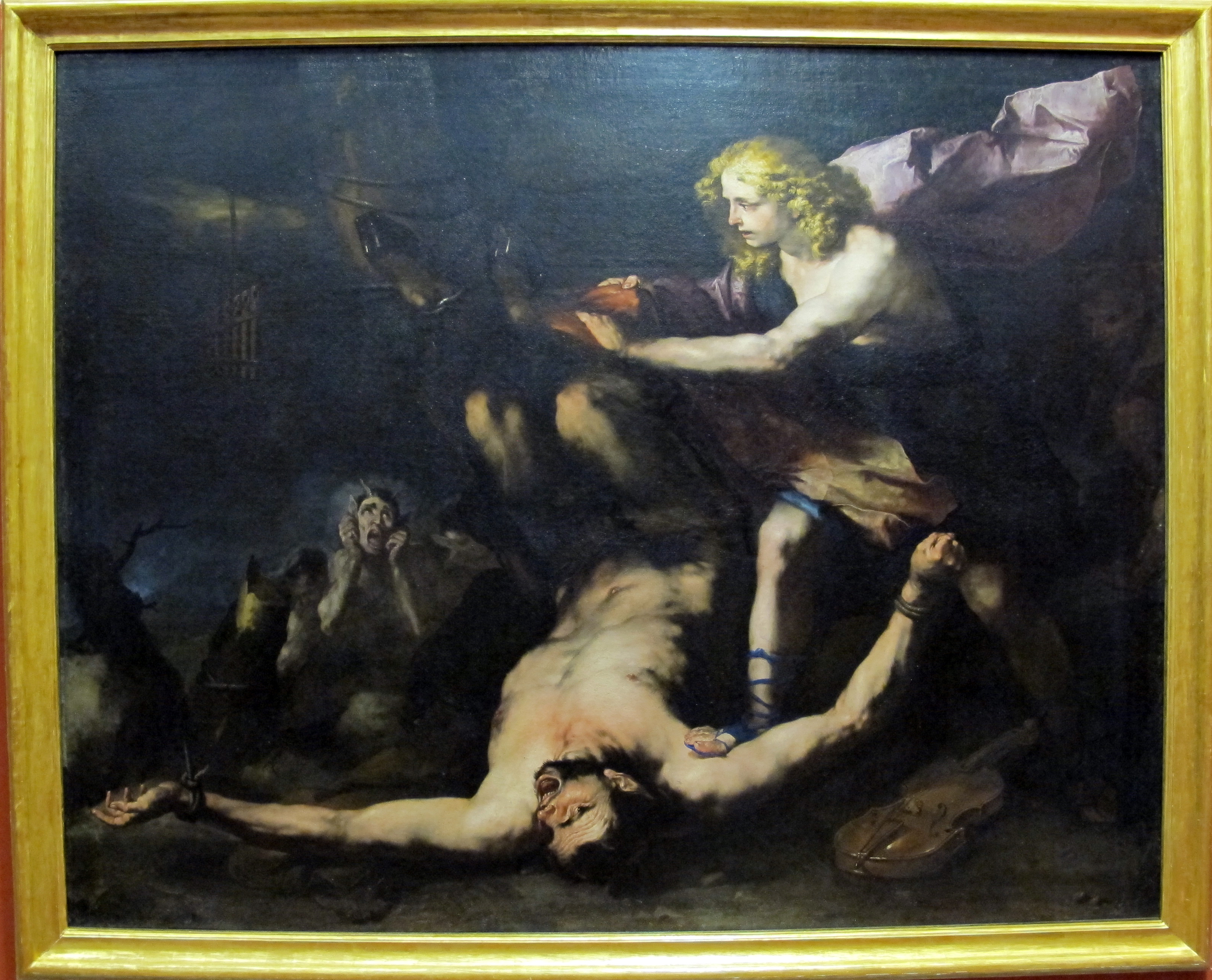

Apollo and Marsyas is a 1659–1660 oil on canvas painting by the Italian Baroque artist Luca Giordano, now in the museo nazionale di Capodimonte in Naples. It was modeled on Ribera's 1637 work on the same subject in the same gallery.

Giordano returned to the subject several times, sometimes varying the composition and sometimes using different sized canvases. A copy of the Naples version, made about a year later at a slightly smaller size, is now in a private collection.

== History ==
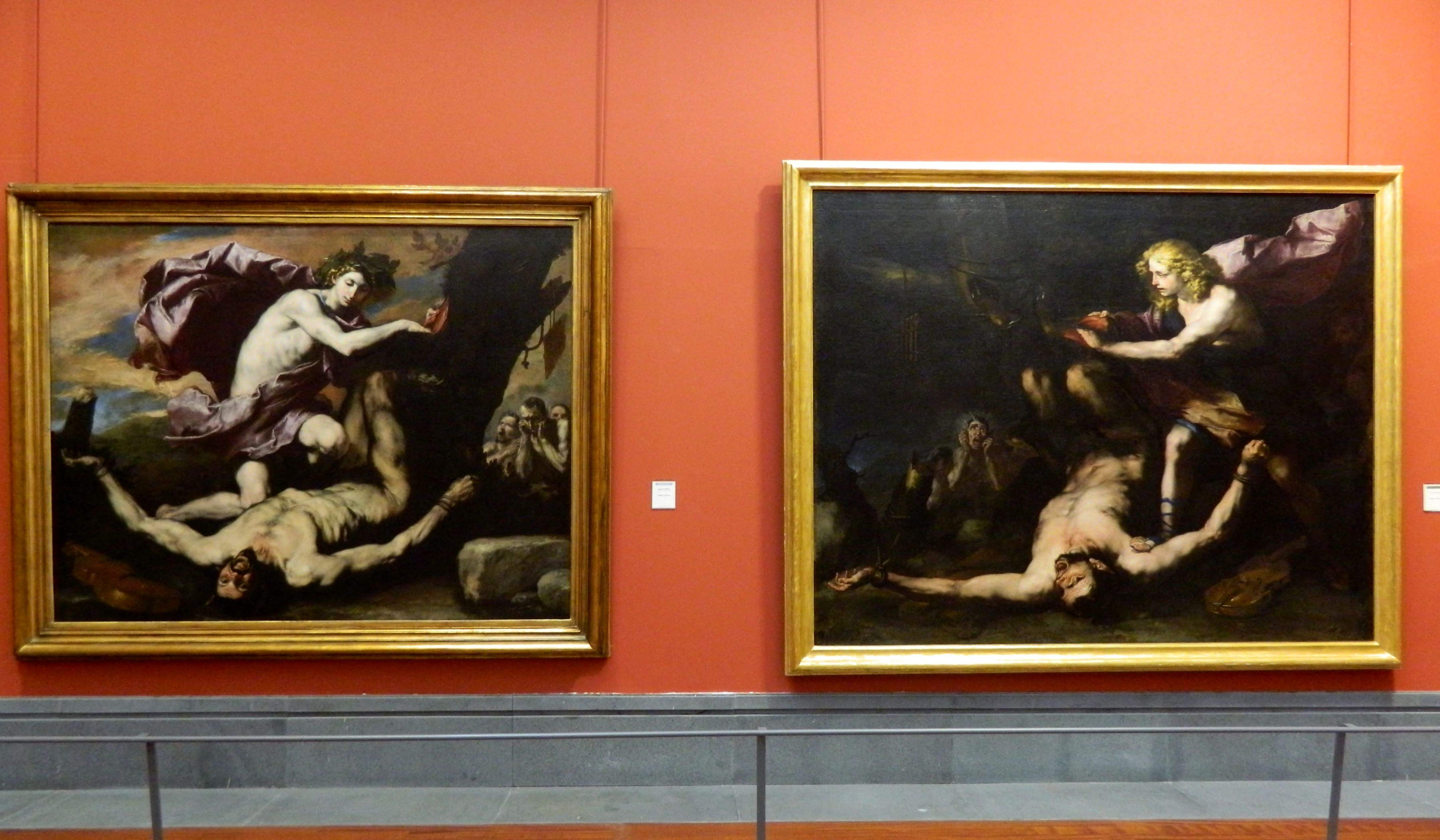
Museum of Capodimonte in Naples. View of the two paintings: on the left the canvas by Ribera, on the right the one by Luca Giordano

The certain information on the Capodimonte canvas reports that it was owned by the Genoese Stefano de Marini (or Marinis), marquis of Genzano with various interests in the Neapolitan city, in whose home it remained until 1673, before being inherited by other members of the family, with whom it remained until 1698. The work subsequently went to the di Sangro, princes of Fondi, who placed it in the family palace in via Medina in Naples, who then sold it to the Italian State in 1879.

A previously accredited account, which has now become less credible, traces the canvas back to the one that appeared in 1688 in the catalogue of the Vandeneynden collection, owned by the Flemish merchant and collector Ferdinand van den Eynde, 1st Marquess of Castelnuovo, son of Jan. Ferdinando was a friend of Gaspare Roomer, the patron of a previous Apollo and Marsyas by Ribera presumably not yet traced, therefore it becomes plausible to think that his commission to Luca Giordano, considered the court painter for the Vandeneynden family and of the Riberian school, occurred because the nobleman had the opportunity to admire and praise the version by Ribera in the home of his compatriot friend. The work cited in the bequest of Ferdinando Vandeneynden, valued at 100 ducats, however dates back to 1688, while this one from Capodimonte appears from archive documents to have been linked to the de Marinis family until 1698. This suggests that the painting owned by the Flemish merchant cannot be identified with the one today in the Neapolitan museum, even though the measurements of the Apollo and Marsyas reported in Ferdinand's appear to be consistent with the one in Capodimonte, or in any case with its replica in a private collection, whose history is more obscure.

The painting in Naples, datable between 1659 and 1660, emulates the composition by Jusepe de Ribera (1591–1652), who about twenty to thirty years earlier had executed a large series of paintings reprising the myth of Apollo and Marsyas which had great success, one version of which was also in Capodimonte (coming from the d'Avalos collection of Prince Andrea di Montesarchio), another in Brussels and another (the one formerly in the Roomer collection) which has not been traced.

In the 1990s, the canvas by Luca Giordano, which was exhibited right next to the Apollo and Marsyas by Ribera in the National Museum of San Martino, was relocated together with it in the Museum of Capodimonte.

== Description and style ==
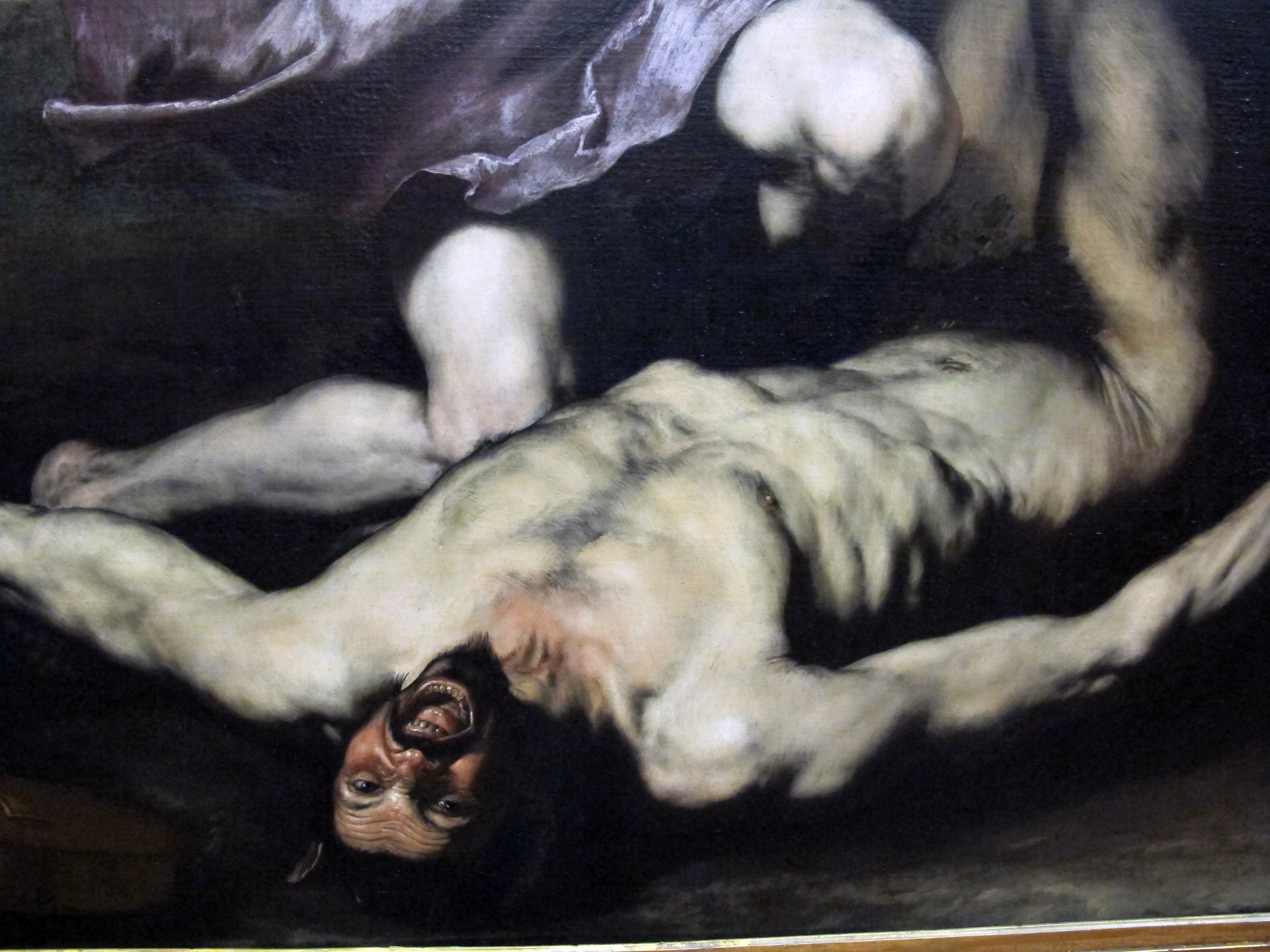
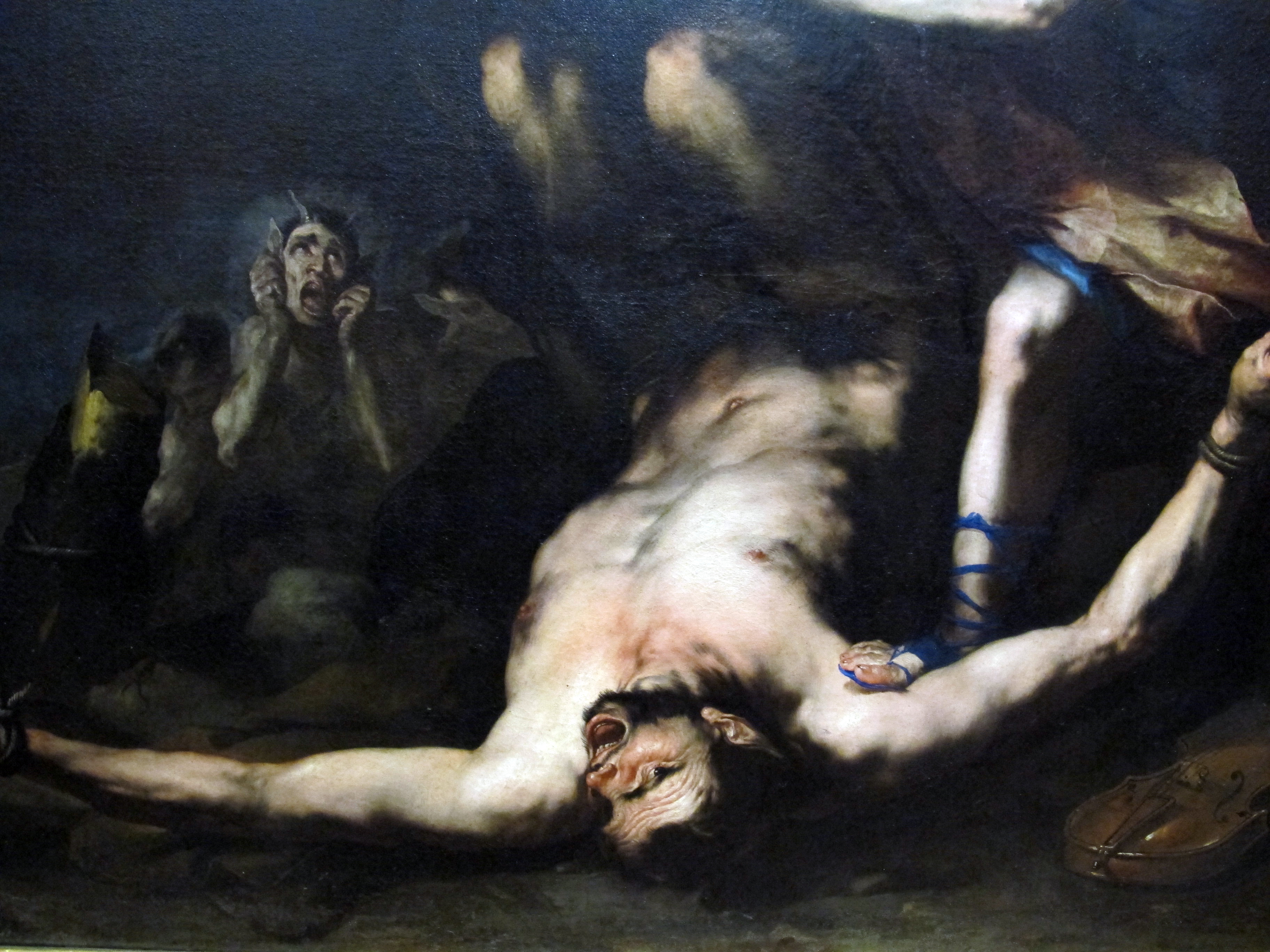
Detail of Marsyas: on the left the Ribera's version, on the right the one by Giordano

The painting is based on the epic verses of Ovid in the Metamorphoses, immortalising the moment in which Apollo is about to carry out the torture (the flaying) on Marsyas, the latter lying on the ground with his feet/paws tied to a tree. According to legend, in fact, the goddess Athena, who had invented the flute, while playing it was mocked by Eros because of the funny grimaces (blushing and puffy cheeks) that her face made while playing the instrument. So the goddess, annoyed by this, dropped the flute on the Earth. Later it was picked up by Marsyas, a satyr (half-man, half-goat) who lived guarding a small river tributary of the Meander, in Anatolia, and he began to play the instrument and practice until he became so good that he considered himself even more capable than Apollo, the god of music.

Apollo then challenged Marsyas to a musical contest, where the first would play the lyre while the second would play the flute. Although the challenge was initially considered a draw, Apollo eventually managed to win thanks to his cunning; in fact, he suggested to the satyr to play the instruments backwards and, while the lyre still emitted harmonious melodies, the flute made no sound. At this point the myth ends with the punishment inflicted on Marsyas who, in fact, was tied to a tree and flayed alive by Apollo.

Giordano's canvas is conceived to be a eulogy to the painting by Ribera, even though his representation of the scene appears expressed in darker tones and with quicker and more nuanced brush strokes, learned during his experience in Rome and Venice, compared to Ribera's version. Analogies with the canvas by the Spanish master can be found not only in the general structure of the composition, built on the diagonal of the tree, although specular to Ribera's version, but also in the smallest details, such as the tormented face of Marsyas, the desperation of the satyrs in the background of the scene, the musical instruments which are the object of the dispute placed on the vertices of the diagonal, the choice to represent the torture in its initiatory phase, the wisteria colour of Apollo's cloak, and finally the god himself who, placed in the foreground, is preparing to flay the satyr starting from his paws tied to the tree.

== Other versions ==
Apollo and Marsyas (1678, Bardini Palace Museum)

Luca Giordano found himself depicting the scene of Ovidian torture several times during his life. A replica (reduced in size) by Giordano of the canvas in Capodimonte is in a private collection. Other versions of the subject are in the Bardini Palace Museum in Florence (1678) and the monastery of El Escorial in Spain (1696).

In both of the last two paintings mentioned, the painter distorted the scene, so much so that Marsyas is no longer seen tied to the tree by his legs, as in the Ribera model, but rather by his arms, where the flaying began. Both versions, however, retain some analogies with the Capodimonte painting: above all Apollo, who is represented similarly even in the colours of the clothes (wisteria cape, blue dress and shoes), although this similarity is more evident in the Florentine version. Furthermore, the Tuscan painting resembles the Neapolitan one also in the nocturnal setting of the scene and in the figure of the satyrs in the background, while the Spanish version is set during the day. The Escorial painting also features several figures scattered across the background, including King Midas with donkey ears, while recalling the Neapolitan version of the canvas in the detail of Apollo's foot towering over Marsyas' body.

Another representation of this myth executed ca. 1687–1689 by Luca Giordano is in the Royal Palace of Caserta. In this version, viewed from a wider angle, the moment immediately following the torture is portrayed: on the top left is Apollo on a chariot heading away from the central scene, at the bottom is Marsyas who has fainted after the torture, while on the right is the figure of King Midas with donkey ears (according to legend, given to him by Apollo because the king of Phrygia had declared the satyr the winner of the challenge).

== Bibliography (in Italian) ==
- Archivio storico per le province napoletane, Napoli, pubblicato a cura di Società napoletana di storia e patria, 2015.
- Museo di Capodimonte, Milano, Touring Club Italiano, 2012, ISBN 978-88-365-2577-5.
- O. Ferrari and G. Scavizzi, Luca Giordano. L'opera completa, Napoli, Electa.
- N. Spinosa, Ribera. L'opera completa, Electa, Napoli 2003.
