= Apollo and Daphnis =

Painting by Pietro Perugino

Apollo and Marsyas or Apollo and Daphnis
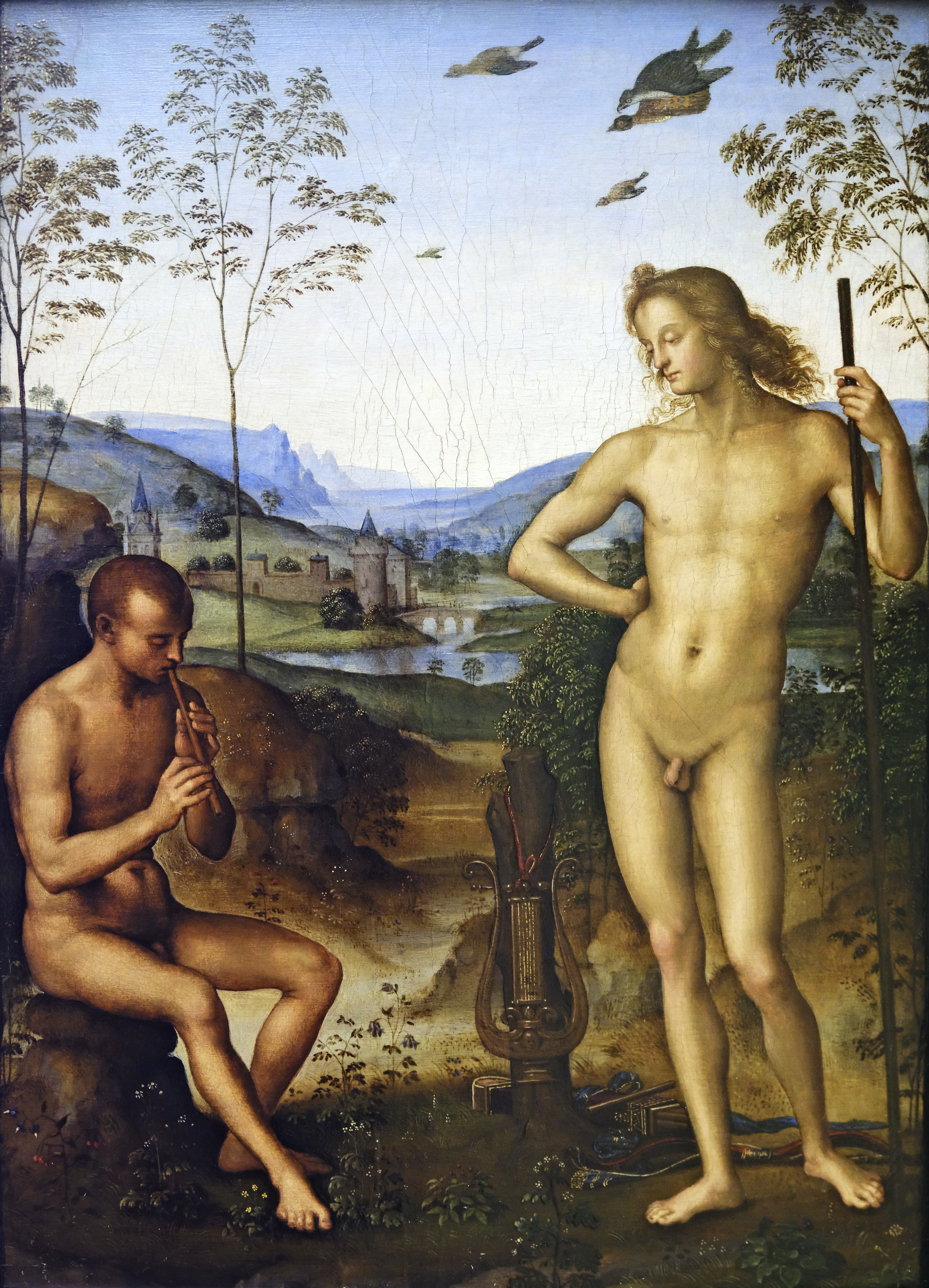
- Artist: Perugino
- Year: c.1483
- Type: oil on panel
- Dimensions: 39 cm × 29 cm (15 in × 11 in)
- Location: Musée du Louvre, Paris

Apollo and Daphnis is a c.1483 mythological painting by Perugino. It was sold to the Louvre in Paris in 1883, where it still hangs and in whose catalogue it was known as Apollo and Marsyas. By the 1880s it had become misattributed to Raphael.

It one of the most notable works commissioned from the artist by Lorenzo de' Medici. In the background is a rural scene with a city or castle, a three-arch bridge, trees typical of Perugino, hills and a river. The two nude figures in the foreground allude to that in ancient Greek and Roman art - this and the other classical references demonstrate how the work is intended to be decoded by the humanist classical elite of Florence. The standing contrapposto figure is the god Apollo, carrying a baton in his left hand and with a bow and quiver behind him. His pose draws on that of Hermes in a sculpture of Hermes and Dionysius by Praxiteles, now best known from the copy Hermes and the Infant Dionysus rediscovered in the 19th century.

The identity of the seated flute-playing figure on the left is debated - it may be Marsyas, but that character is usually depicted as a satyr and so it may instead by Daphnis, a young shepherd who died of love for Apollo. Daphnis is the Greek form of the name Laurus, possibly linking the work to Lorenzo de' Medici. His pose draws on a sculpture of Hermes by Lysippus, best known from the Seated Hermes discovered in 1758.

== See also ==
- Apollo and Marsyas

== Bibliography ==
- (in Italian) Vittoria Garibaldi, « Perugino », in Pittori del Rinascimento, Florence, Scala, 2004 (ISBN 888117099X).
- (in Italian) Pierluigi De Vecchi and Elda Cerchiari, I tempi dell'arte, vol. 2, Milan, Bompiani, 1999 (ISBN 88-451-7212-0).
- (in Italian) Stefano Zuffi, Il Quattrocento, Milan, Electa, 2004 (ISBN 8837023154).
