= Celaenae =

Ancient city of Phrygia

Coordinates: 38°04′N 30°10′E

Celaenae or Kelainai (Greek: Κελαιναί) was an ancient city of Phrygia and capital of the Persian satrapy of Greater Phrygia, near the source of the Maeander River in what is today west central Turkey (Dinar of Afyonkarahisar Province), and was situated on the great trade route to the East.

== History ==
It is first mentioned by Herodotus, in Book VII of his Histories; describing the route of Xerxes on his way to invade Greece in 480 BC, he writes:

"On their way through Phrygia they reached Celaenae, where two rivers rise — the Meander and one called the Catarractes, which is just as large as the Meander. The Catarractes rises right in the main square of Celaenae and issues into the Meander. Another feature of the square of Celaenae is that the skin of Marsyas the silenus is hanging there, where it was put, according to local Phrygian legend, after Marsyas had been flayed by Apollo."

Xenophon describes it, in Book I of his Anabasis, as the place where Cyrus mustered his Greek mercenaries in 401 BC:

"From this place he marched three stages, twenty parasangs in all, to Celaenae, a populous city of Phrygia, large and prosperous. Here Cyrus owned a palace and a large park full of wild beasts, which he used to hunt on horseback, whenever he wished to give himself or his horses exercise. Through the midst of the park flows the river Maeander, the sources of which are within the palace buildings, and it flows through the city of Celaenae. The great king also has a palace in Celaenae, a strong place, on the sources of another river, the Marsyas, at the foot of the acropolis. This river also flows through the city, discharging itself into the Maeander, and is five-and-twenty feet broad. Here is the place where Apollo is said to have flayed Marsyas, when he had conquered him in the contest of skill. He hung up the skin of the conquered man, in the cavern where the spring wells forth, and hence the name of the river, Marsyas. It was on this site that Xerxes, as tradition tells, built this very palace, as well as the citadel of Celaenae itself, on his retreat from Hellas, after he had lost the famous battle."

In 394 Agesilaus II, on reaching the Meander on his march through Phrygia, consulted an oracle to determine whether he should attack Celaenae; on receiving a negative omen, he went back down the valley to Ephesus. "In reality, the omens simply confirmed a prior decision: to march against Celaenae would be terribly risky."

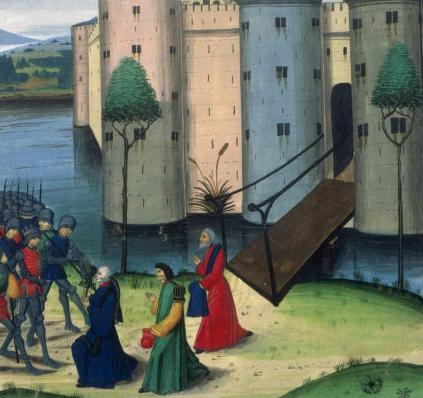
Surrender of Celaenae to Alexander the Great in medieval manuscript.

In the winter of 333 BC, Alexander arrived outside the city, which "had a major Persian settlement" and was well known for its enormous park and "the great fortified estates (tetrapyrgia) immediately around the town," which "evince the richness of the agriculture and husbandry of a country 'abounding in villages rather than in cities' (Quintus Curtius III.1.11)." Its acropolis long held out, and surrendered to him at last by arrangement. His successor, Eumenes, made it for some time his headquarters, as did Antigonus until 301.

From Lysimachus it passed to Seleucus I Nicator, whose son Antiochus I Soter, seeing its geographical importance, refounded it on a more open site as Apamea; Ronald Syme writes: "From a topographical point of view the change was less considerable than, for example, at Nysa, a new city constituted by the synoecism of three separate villages."

== Sources ==
- Smith, William (editor); Dictionary of Greek and Roman Geography, "Celaenae", London, (1854)
- G. Weber, Dinair Célènes-Apamée-Cibotos (46 pages with a plan and two maps) (Besançon: Delagrange Louys, 1892).
- Ronald Syme (ed. Anthony Richard Birley), Anatolica: Studies in Strabo (Oxford University Press, 1995: ISBN 0-19-814943-3).
