= Olympus (musician) =

Ancient Greek musicians

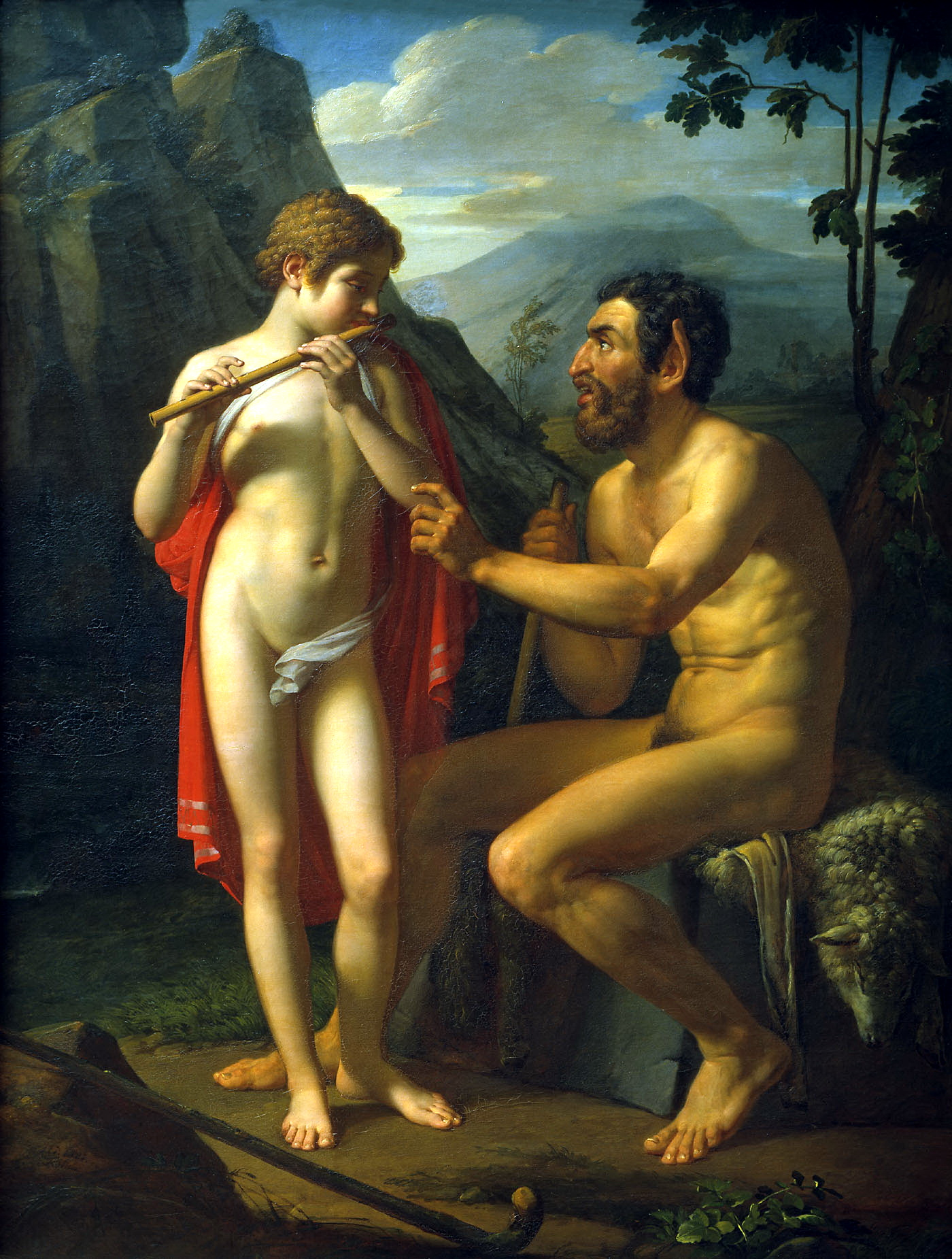
Pyotr Basin, The Faun Marsyas Teaches Olympus to Play the Flute (1821), Russian Museum, Saint Petersburg

Olympus (Ancient Greek: Ὄλυμπος, romanized: Ólumpos) is the name of two ancient Greek musicians, one mythical who lived before the Trojan War and purportedly introduced instrumental music into Greece, and one apparently real, who lived in the 7th century BC. Both musicians were connected with the auletic music, which had its origin in Phrygia. It is possible that the elder and mythical Olympus was invented through some mistake respecting the younger and historical Olympus.

== Mythical Olympus ==
The elder Olympus belongs to the mythical genealogy of Mysian and Phrygian flute-players: Hyagnis, Marsyas, and Olympus, to each of whom the invention of the flute was ascribed, and under whose names we have the mythical representation of the contest between the Phrygian auletic and the Greek citharoedic music: some writers made him the father (instead of son, or disciple, and favourite) of Marsyas, but the genealogy given above was that more generally received.

Olympus was said to have been a native of Mysia, and to have lived before the Trojan War. The compositions ascribed to him were old melodies appropriated to the worship of particular gods, the origin of which was so ancient as to be unknown, like those attributed to Olen and Philammon. Olympus not infrequently appears on works of art, as a boy, sometimes instructed by Marsyas, and sometimes as witnessing and lamenting his fate. After his father was flayed alive, Apollo gave the rest of his body to Olympus for burial. He was also said to be a student of the mythological god Pan in the playing of the flute, and numerous ancient works of art still exist depicting them wrestling.

== Real Olympus ==
The historical Olympus was a Phrygian, and perhaps belonged to a family of native musicians, since he was said to be descended from the first Olympus. He is placed by Plutarch at the head of auletic music, as Terpander stood at the head of the citharoedic: and on account of his inventions in the art, Plutarch even assigns to him, rather than to Terpander, the honour of being the father of Greek music. With respect to his age, the Suda places him under a king Midas, son of Gordias, but this tells us nothing, for these were alternately the names of all the Phrygian kings to the time of Croesus. He may have lived after Terpander and before Thaletas, that is, between the 30th and 40th Olympiads, 660–620 BC. Though a Phrygian by origin, Olympus must be reckoned among the Greek musicians; for all the accounts make Greece the scene of his artistic activity, and his subjects Greek; and he had Greek disciples, such as Crates and Hierax. He may, in fact, be considered as having naturalized in Greece the music of the flute, which had previously been almost peculiar to Phrygia. This species of music admitted of much greater variations than that of the lyre; and, accordingly, several new inventions are ascribed to Olympus. The greatest of his inventions was that of the third system, or genus, of music, the enharmonic.

Of the particular tunes (nomoi) ascribed to him, the most important was the Harmatios nomos, a mournful and passionate strain, of the rhythm of which we are enabled to form an idea from a passage in the Orestes of Euripides, which was set to it, as the passage itself tells us. A dirge, also, in honour of the slain Python, was said to have been played by Olympus, at Delphi, on the flute, and in the Lydian style. Aristophanes mentions a mournful strain, set to more flutes than one (xynaulia) as well known at Athens under the name of Olympus. But it can hardly be supposed that his music was all mournful; the nome in honour of Athena, at least, must have been of a different character. Some ancient writers ascribe to him the Nomos Orthios, which Herodotus attributes to Arion.

Olympus was a great inventor in rhythm as well as in music. To the two existing species of rhythm, the ison, in which the arsis and thesis are equal (as in the Dactyl and Anapaest), and the diplasion, in which the arsis is twice the length of the thesis (as in the Iambus and Trochee), he added a third, the hemiolion in which the length of the arsis is equal to two short syllables, and that of the thesis to three, as, in the cretic foot, the paeons, and the Bacchic foot, though there is some doubt whether the last form was used by Olympus.

There is no mention of any poems composed by Olympus. It is argued by some writers that the inseparable connection between the earliest compositions in music and poetry forbids the supposition that he composed music without words. Without entering into this difficult and extensive question, it is enough to observe that, whatever words may have been originally connected with his music, they were superseded by the compositions of later poets. Of the lyric poets who adapted their compositions to the nomes of Olympus, the chief was Stesichorus of Himera.
