= Babys (mythology) =

Satyr in Greek mythology

Babys (Ancient Greek: Βάβυς, romanized: Bábus) is a figure in Greek mythology. He is the brother of the Phrygian satyr Marsyas who challenged Apollo to a flute-playing contest, and lost to him. Unlike his brother, who owned a double flute, Babys's flute had only one pipe. Perceiving him to be a simpleton who lacked any apparent skill, the goddess Athena persuaded Apollo to spare Babys his anger when the god won the competition, as Babys's playing had been that bad.

== See also ==
- Aulos
- Midas

== Bibliography ==
- Grimal, Pierre (1986). A Concise Dictionary of Classical Mythology. Translated by A. R. Maxwell-Hyslop. Oxford: Basil Blackwell, Ltd. ISBN 0-631-16696-3.
