= Tetrapyrgia (Pamphylia) =

Town of the Roman province of Pamphylia

Coordinates: 36°53′21″N 30°50′59″E

Tetrapyrgia (Ancient Greek: Τετραπυργία, 'four towers') was a town of the Roman province of Pamphylia (clustered around a central part of Turkey's southern Mediterranean coast). It was near the coast and inhabited in Roman times.

Its site is east of contemporary settlement Limnae. It was useful for trading goods from Asiatic Turkey (Anatolia).
