= Hyagnis (mythology) =

Greek mythological figure

Hyagnis (Ancient Greek: Ὑάγνις or Ἄγνις) was a mythical musician from Phrygia who was considered to be the inventor of the aulos. Hyagnis was also one of the three mythical Phrygian musicians (along with Marsyas and Olympus) to whom the Ancient Greeks attributed the invention of the Phrygian mode in music. He was called the "divine" father of Marsyas probably by Olympus or Oeagrus.
