= Limnae (Pamphylia) =

Ancient town in what is now modern Turkey

Coordinates: 36°52′57″N 30°47′27″E

Limnae or Limnai (Ancient Greek: Λίμναι) was a town of ancient Pamphylia, inhabited during Roman times.

Its site is located near Yalnızbağ Değirmen, in Asiatic Turkey.
