= Tetrapyrgia (Cappadocia) =

Town in the district of Garsauria of ancient Cappadocia

Coordinates: 37°01′19″N 34°07′03″E

Tetrapyrgia (Ancient Greek: Τετραπυργία, 'four towers') was a town in the district of Garsauria of ancient Cappadocia.

Its site is tentatively located near Kemeryayla, in Asiatic Turkey.
