= Landscape with Apollo and Marsyas =

Painting by Claude Lorrain

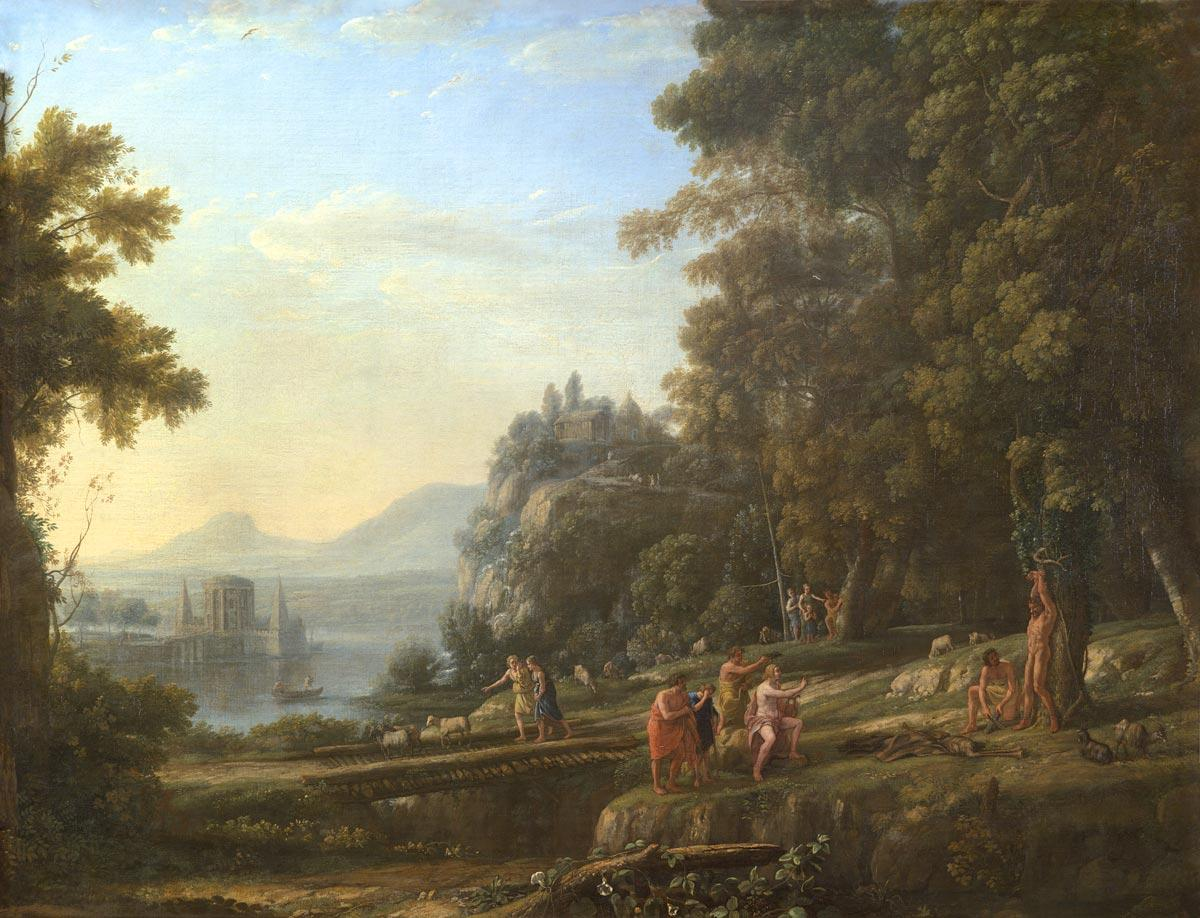
Landscape with Apollo and Marsyas (c. 1639) by Claude Lorrain

Landscape with Apollo and Marsyas is an oil on canvas painting by Claude Lorrain, created c. 1639. It is held now in the Pushkin Museum, in Moscow.

The artist recorded it in his Liber Veritatis as number 45, captioned "made for monsier Perochet", meaning the art collector Guillaume Perochet, for whom Lorrain produced four works in total between 1637 and 1639. It was in the Crozat collection from 1755, which was bought in its entirety by Catherine the Great for the Hermitage Museum, from which it was transferred to its present home in 1924.

A 1645 variant of the work is shown in the Liber Veritas, compositionally close to the Moscow work but in reverse - the finished work is now in Holkham Hall.
