= Apollo and Marsyas (Ribera, Brussels) =

Painting by José de Ribera

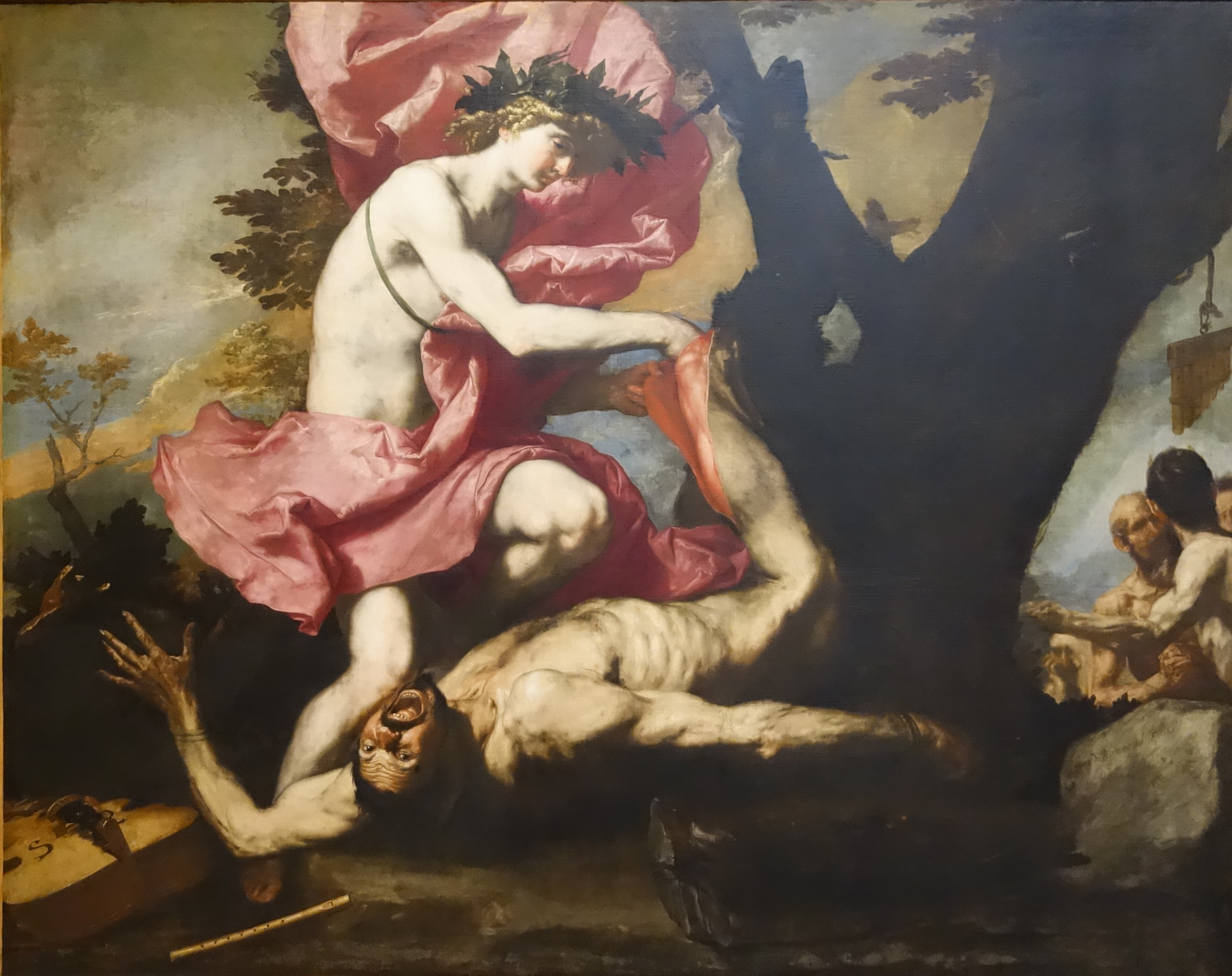
The Brussels prime version.

Apollo and Marsyas is the title of a 1637 painting by the Spanish artist José de Ribera, now in the Royal Museum of Fine Arts of Belgium. Other versions are now in the Museo di Capodimonte and the Naples Archaeological Museum. They all show the Caravaggisti's heavy influence on the artist, and depict Marsyas' flaying by Apollo.

== Description ==
The scene describes the moment in which the god Apollo skins the satyr Marsyas after losing the music contest to which he had challenged the god. The muses had to judge, but they always tied in their interpretation, until Apollo introduced the need to sing while playing, something that he could do because his instrument was a lyre while for Marsyas it was impossible because he played the aulos. As a punishment, Marsyas is hung on a tree and skinned alive, while looking at the viewer as if begging for his intervention or help. On the contrary, the god is represented in an almost idealized and serene way, pleased by his triumph and subsequent action. The theme is somewhat crude, typical of Ribera's painting.

== Sources ==
- https://web.archive.org/web/20120204040837/http://www.artehistoria.jcyl.es/genios/cuadros/10813.htm
