= Marsyas =

Satyr musician in Greek mythology

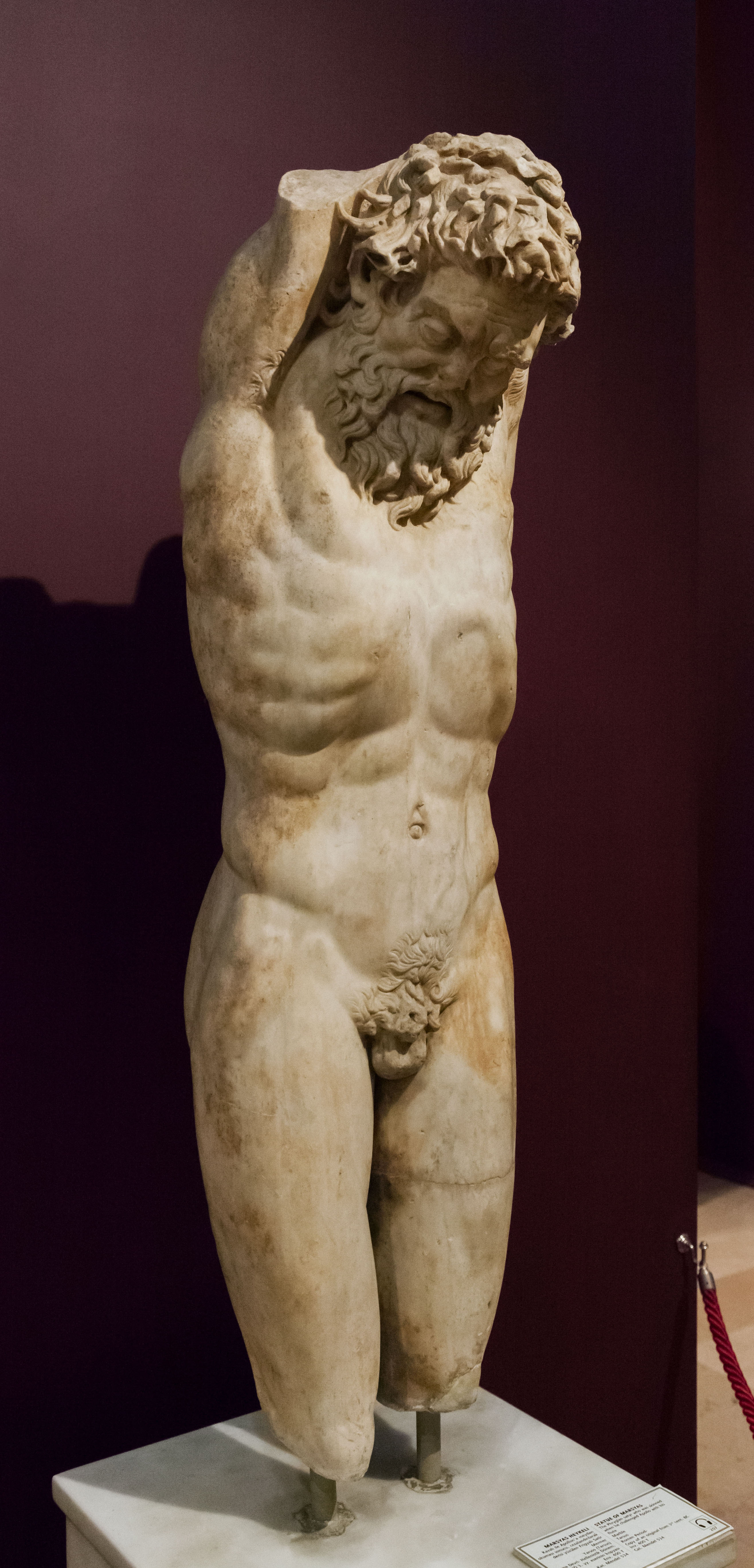
Marsyas receiving Apollo's punishment, İstanbul Archaeology Museum

In Greek mythology, the satyr Marsyas (/ˈmɑːrsiəs/; Ancient Greek: Μαρσύας) is a central figure in two stories involving music: in one, he picked up the double oboe (aulos) that had been abandoned by Athena and played it; in the other, he challenged Apollo to a contest of music and lost his hide and life. Literary sources from antiquity often emphasize the hubris of Marsyas and the justice of his punishment.

One strand of modern comparative mythography regards the domination of Marsyas by Apollo as an example of myth that recapitulates a supposed supplanting by the Olympian pantheon of an earlier "Pelasgian" religion of chthonic heroic ancestors and nature spirits. Marsyas was a devoté of the ancient Mother Goddess Rhea/Cybele, and the mythographers situate his episodes in Celaenae (or Kelainai), in Phrygia, at the main source of the Meander (the river Menderes in Turkey).

== Family ==
When a genealogy was applied to him, Marsyas was the son of the "divine" Hyagnis. His father was called Oeagrus or Olympus. Alternatively, the latter was said to be Marsyas' son and/or pupil and eromenos.

== Mythology ==
=== The finding of the aulos ===
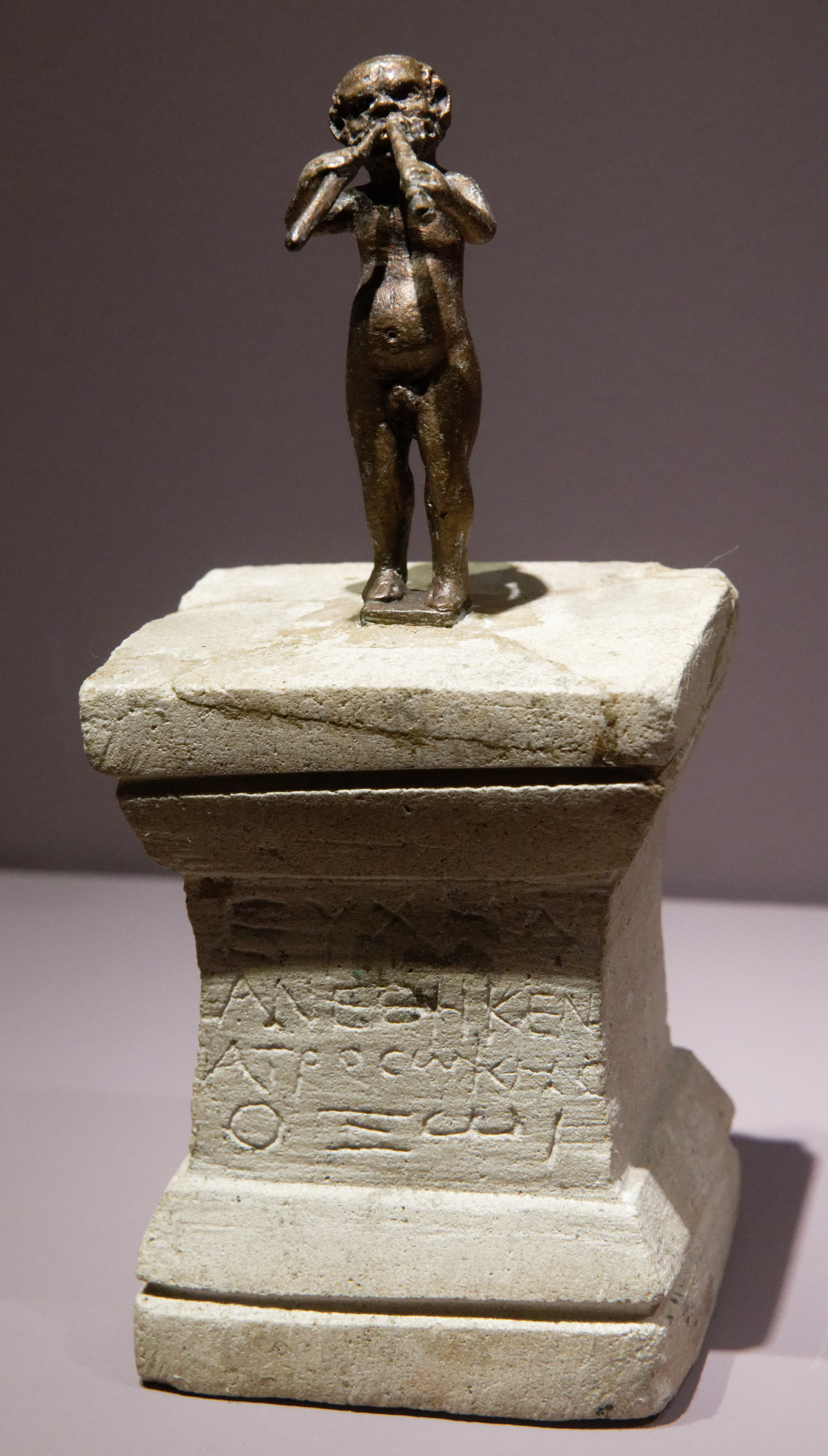
Hellenistic Marsyas playing the aulos, with dedication in Greek to the god Oxus, by "Atrosokes", a Bactrian name. Temple of the Oxus, Takht-i Sangin, 200-150 BC. National Museum of Antiquities of Tajikistan.

Marsyas was an expert player on the double-piped double reed instrument known as the aulos. The dithyrambic poet Melanippides of Melos (c. 480 – 430 BC) embellished the story in his dithyramb Marsyas, claiming that the goddess Athena, who was already said to have invented the aulos, once looked in the mirror while she was playing it and saw how blowing into it puffed up her cheeks and made her look silly, so she threw the aulos away and cursed it so that whoever picked it up would meet an awful death. Marsyas picked up the aulos and was later killed by Apollo for his hubris. The fifth-century BC poet Telestes doubted that virginal Athena could have been motivated by such vanity.

Later, however, Melanippides's story became accepted as canonical and the Athenian sculptor Myron created a group of bronze sculptures based on it, which was installed before the western front of the Parthenon around 440 BC. In the second century AD, the travel writer Pausanias saw this set of sculptures and described it as "a statue of Athena striking Marsyas the Silenos for taking up the flutes [aulos] that the goddess wished to be cast away for good".

=== Marsyas and Apollo ===
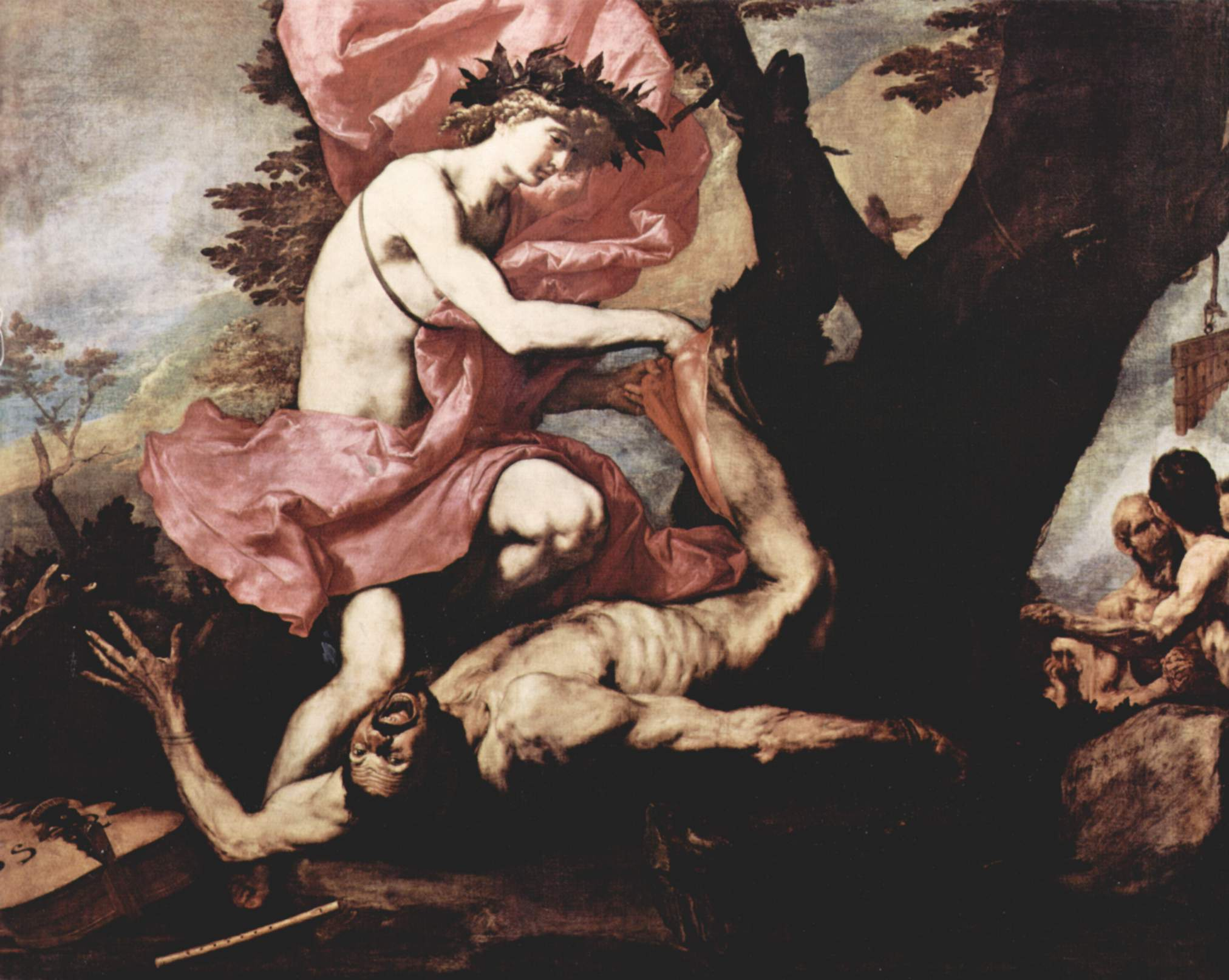
Apollo flaying Marsyas in Apollo and Marsyas by José de Ribera

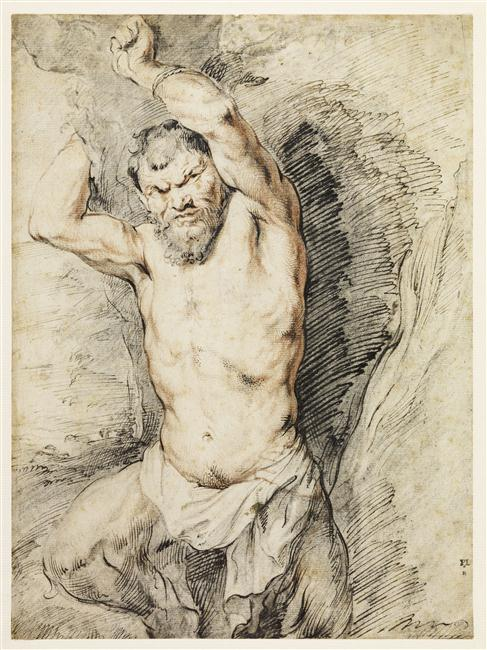
Marsyas tied, by Peter Paul Rubens, Louvre Museum

In the contest between Apollo and Marsyas, which was judged by the Muses or the Nysean nymphs, the terms stated that the winner could treat the defeated party any way he wanted. Marsyas played his flute, putting everyone there into a frenzy, and they started dancing wildly. When it was Apollo's turn, he played his lyre so beautifully that everyone was still and had tears in their eyes.

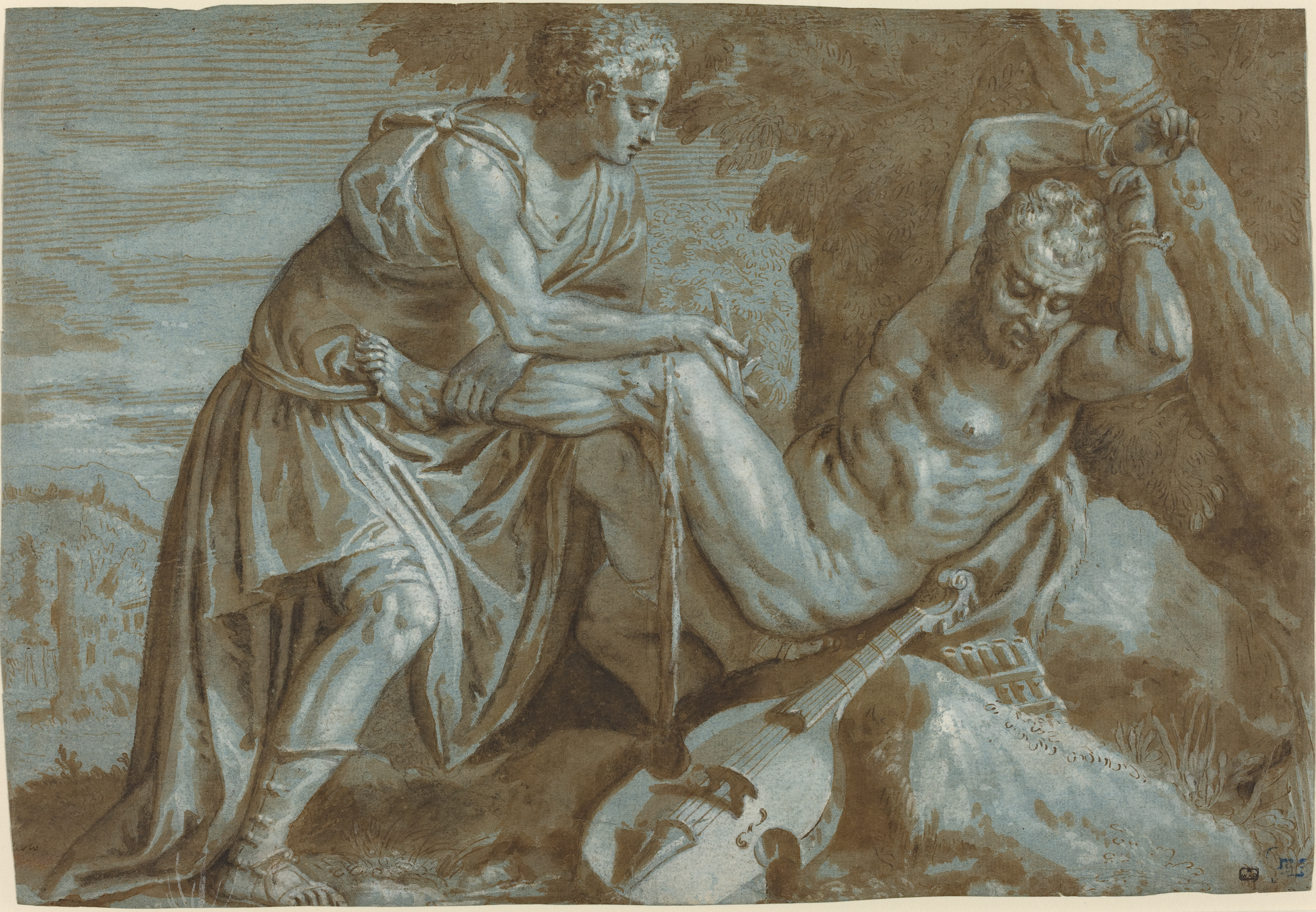
Apollo and Marsyas, attributed to Paolo Veronese, National Gallery of Art

There are several versions of the contest; according to Hyginus, Marsyas was departing as victor after the first round, when Apollo, turning his lyre upside down, played the same tune. This was something that Marsyas could not do with his flute. According to Diodorus Siculus, Marsyas was defeated when Apollo added his voice to the sound of the lyre. Marsyas protested, arguing that the skill with the instrument was to be compared, not the voice. However, Apollo replied that when Marsyas blew into the pipes, he was doing almost the same thing. The Nysean nymphs supported Apollo's claim, leading to his victory.

Yet another version states that Marsyas played the flute out of tune, and hence accepted his defeat. Out of shame, he chose the penalty of being skinned to be used as a winesack.

He was flayed alive in a cave near Celaenae for his hubris to challenge a deity. Apollo then nailed Marsyas' skin to a pine tree, near Lake Aulocrene (Karakuyu Gölü in modern Turkey), which Strabo noted was full of the reeds from which the pipes were fashioned. Diodorus Siculus felt that Apollo must have repented this "excessive" deed, and said that he had laid aside his lyre for a while, but Karl Kerenyi observes of the flaying of Marsyas' "shaggy hide: a penalty which will not seem especially cruel if one assumes that Marsyas' animal guise was merely a masquerade". Classical Greeks were unaware of such shamanistic overtones, and the flaying of Marsyas became a theme for painting and sculpture. His brothers, nymphs, gods, and goddesses mourned his death, and their tears, according to Ovid's Metamorphoses, were the source of the river Marsyas in Phrygia (called Çine Creek today), which joins the Meander near Celaenae, where Herodotus reported that the flayed skin of Marsyas was still to be seen, and Ptolemy Hephaestion recorded a "festival of Apollo, where the skins of all those victims one has flayed are offered to the god".

Plato was of the opinion that the skin of Marsyas had been made into a wineskin.

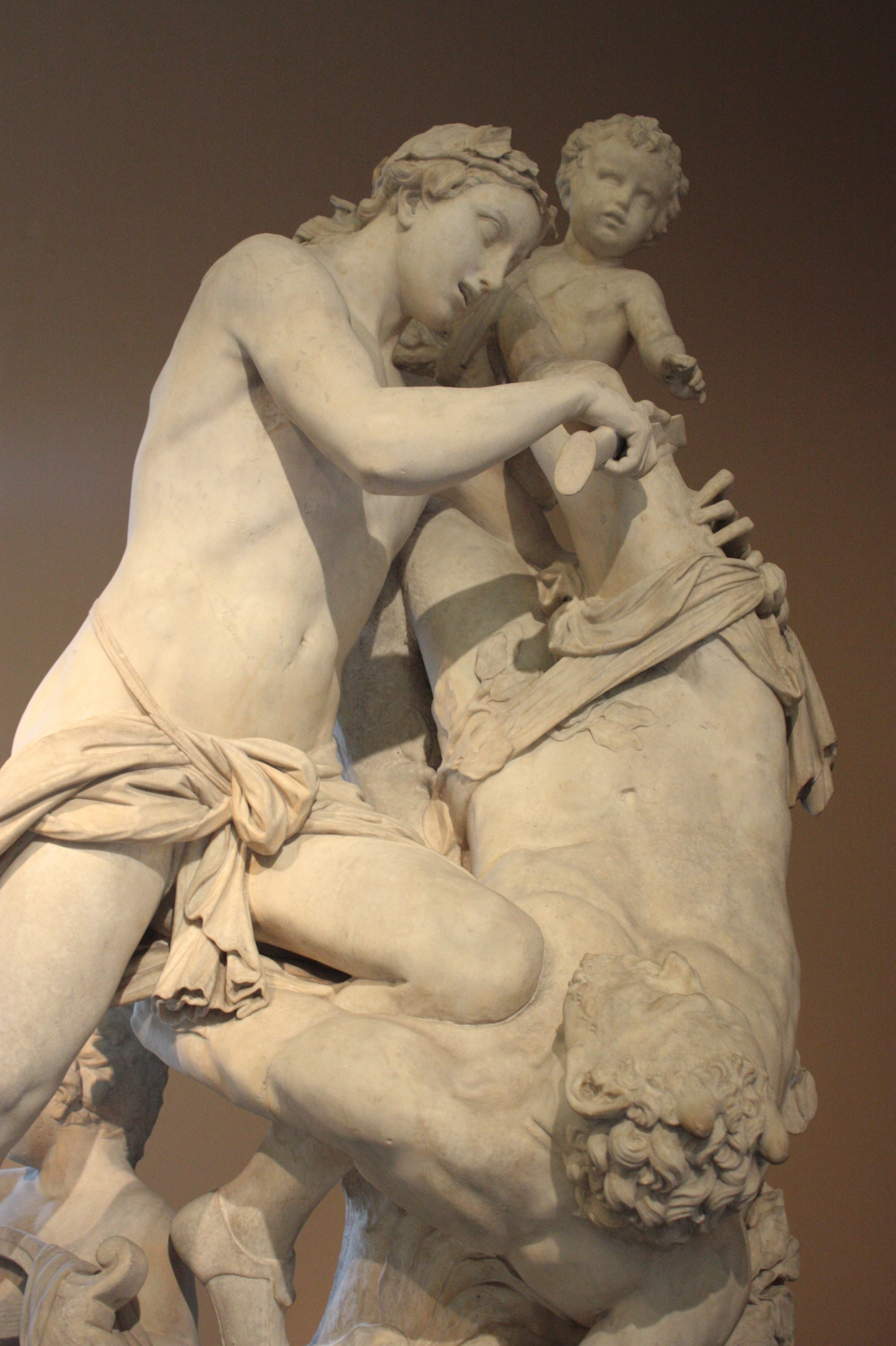
Apollo flaying Marsyas by Antonio Corradini (1658–1752), Victoria and Albert Museum, London

Ovid touches upon the theme of Marsyas twice, very briefly telling the tale in Metamorphoses vi.383–400, where he concentrates on the tears shed into the river Marsyas, and making an allusion in Fasti, vi.649–710, where Ovid's primary focus is on the aulos and the roles of flute-players rather than Marsyas, whose name is not mentioned.

In Phrygia, there was a river called Marsyas, which the Phrygians believed originated from the blood of Marsyas.

== The wise Marsyas ==
The hubristic Marsyas in surviving literary sources eclipses the figure of the wise Marsyas that is suggested in a few words by the Hellenistic historian Diodorus Siculus, who refers to Marsyas as admired for his intelligence (sunesis) and self-control (sophrosune), not qualities found by Greeks in ordinary satyrs. In Plato's Symposium, when Alcibiades likens Socrates to Marsyas, it is this aspect of the wise satyr that is intended. Jocelyn Small identifies in Marsyas an artist great enough to challenge a deity, who can only be defeated through a ruse. A prominent statue of Marsyas as a wise old silenus stood near the Roman Forum.

This is the Marsyas of the journal, Marsyas: Studies in the History of Art, published since 1941 by students of the Institute of Art, New York University.

== Prophecy and free speech at Rome ==
Among the Romans, Marsyas was cast as the inventor of augury and a proponent of free speech (the philosophical concept παρρησία, "parrhesia") and "speaking truth to power". The earliest known representation of Marsyas at Rome stood for at least 300 years in the Roman Forum near or in the comitium, the space for political activity. He also was depicted as a silen, carrying a wineskin on his left shoulder and raising his right arm. The statue was regarded as an indicium libertatis, a symbol of liberty, and was associated with demonstrations of the plebs, or common people. It often served as a sort of kiosk upon which invective verse was posted.

Marsyas served as a minister for Dionysus or Bacchus, who was identified by the Romans with their Father Liber, one of three deities in the Aventine Triad, along with Ceres and Libera (identified with Persephone). These deities were regarded as concerning themselves specially with the welfare of the plebs. The freedom that the ecstasies of Dionysian worship represented took on a political meaning in Rome as the libertas that distinguished the free from the enslaved. The Liberalia, celebrated March 17 in honor of Liber, was a time of speaking freely, as the poet and playwright Gnaeus Naevius declared: "At the Liberalia games we enjoy free speech." Nonetheless, Naevius was arrested for his invectives against the powerful.

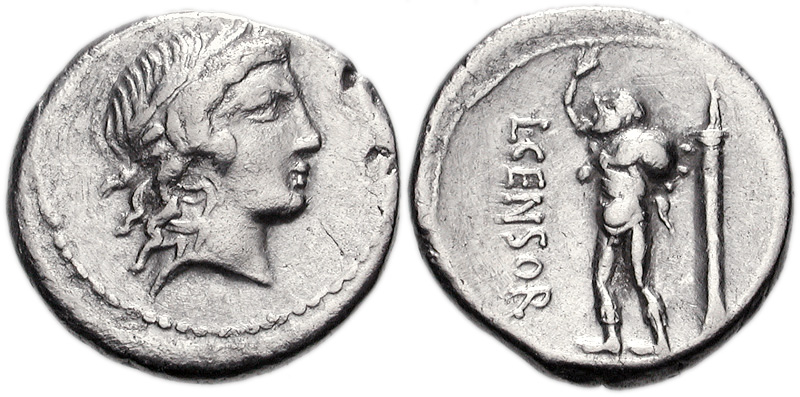
Denarius minted at Rome in 82 BC by L. Censorinus, with the head of Apollo and the figure of Marsyas holding a wineskin, based on the statue in the forum

Marsyas was sometimes considered a king and contemporary of Faunus, portrayed by Vergil as a native Italian ruler at the time of Aeneas. Servius, in his commentary on the Aeneid, says that Marsyas sent Faunus envoys who showed techniques of augury to the Italians. The plebeian gens of the Marcii claimed that they were descended from Marsyas. Gaius Marcius Rutilus, who rose to power from the plebs, is credited with having dedicated the statue that stood in the Roman forum, most likely in 294 BC, when he became the first plebeian censor and added the cognomen Censorinus to the family name. Marcius Rutilus was also among the first plebeian augurs, co-opted into their college in 300 BC, and so the mythical teacher of augury was an apt figure to represent him.

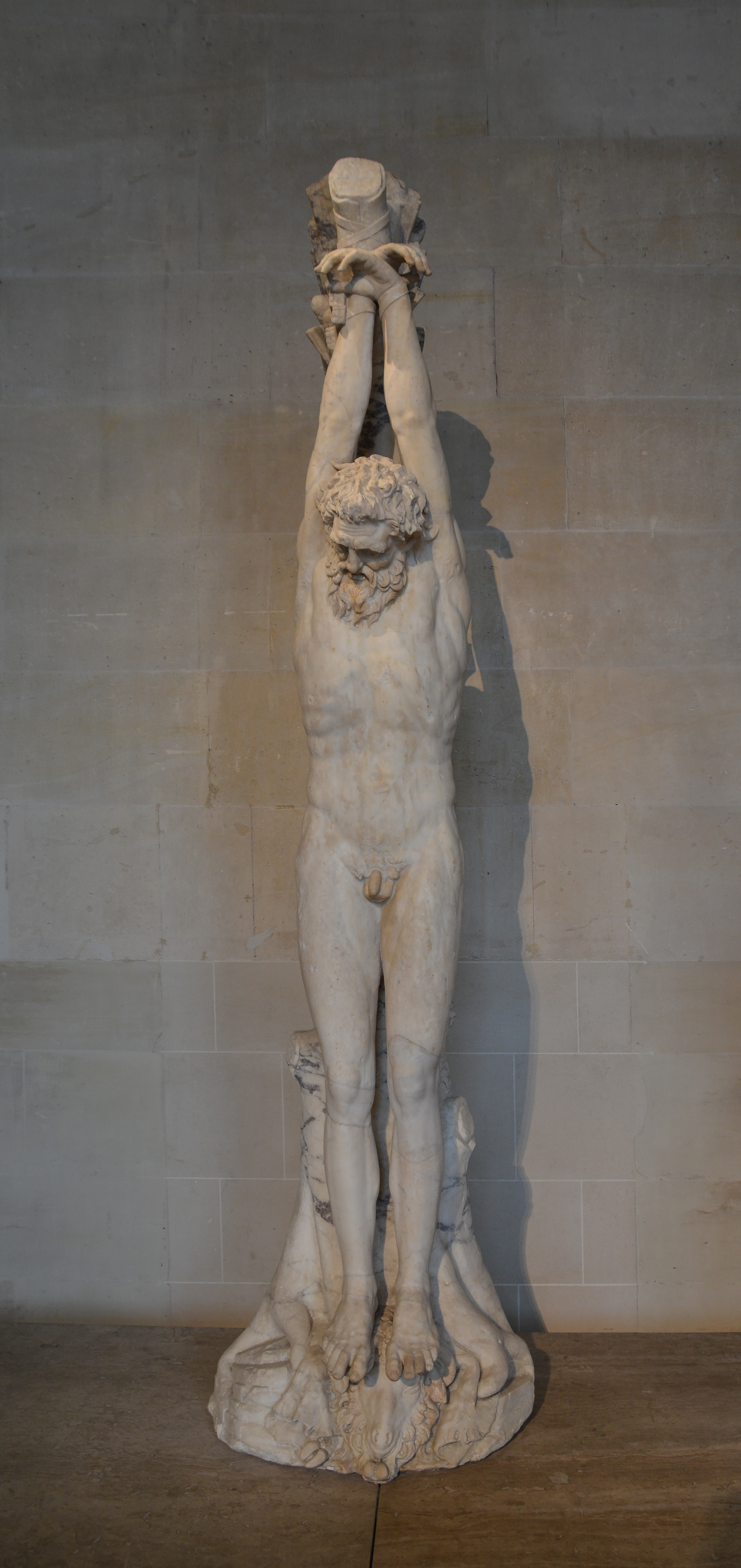
The Torment of Marsyas, Louvre Museum, Paris

In 213 BC, two years after suffering one of the worst military defeats in its history at the Battle of Cannae, Rome was in the grip of a reactionary fear that led to excessive religiosity. The Roman Senate, alarmed that its authority was being undermined by "prophets and sacrificers" in the forum, began a program of suppression. Among the literature confiscated was an "authentic" prophecy calling for the institution of games in the Greek manner for Apollo, which the Roman Senate and elected officials would control. The prophecy was attributed to Gnaeus Marcius, reputed to be a descendant of Marsyas. The games were duly carried out, but the Romans failed to bring the continuing wars with the Carthaginians to a victorious conclusion until they heeded a second prophecy and imported the worship of the Phrygian Great Mother, Cybele, whose song Marsyas was said to have composed; the song had further relevance in that it was also credited by the Phrygians with protecting them from invaders. The power relations between Marsyas and Apollo reflected the continuing Struggle of the Orders between the elite and the common people, expressed in political terms by optimates and populares. The arrest of Naevius for exercising free speech also took place during this period.

Another descendant of Marcius Rutilus, L. Marcius Censorinus, issued coins depicting the statue of Marsyas, at a time when the augural college was the subject of political controversy during the Sullan civil wars of the 80s BC. On the coin, Marsyas wears a Phrygian cap or pilleus, an emblem of liberty. This Marcius Censorinus was killed by Sulla and his head displayed outside Praeneste. Sulla's legislative program attempted to curtail power invested in the people, particularly restricting the powers of the plebeian tribunes, and to restore the dominance of the senate and the privileges of patricians.

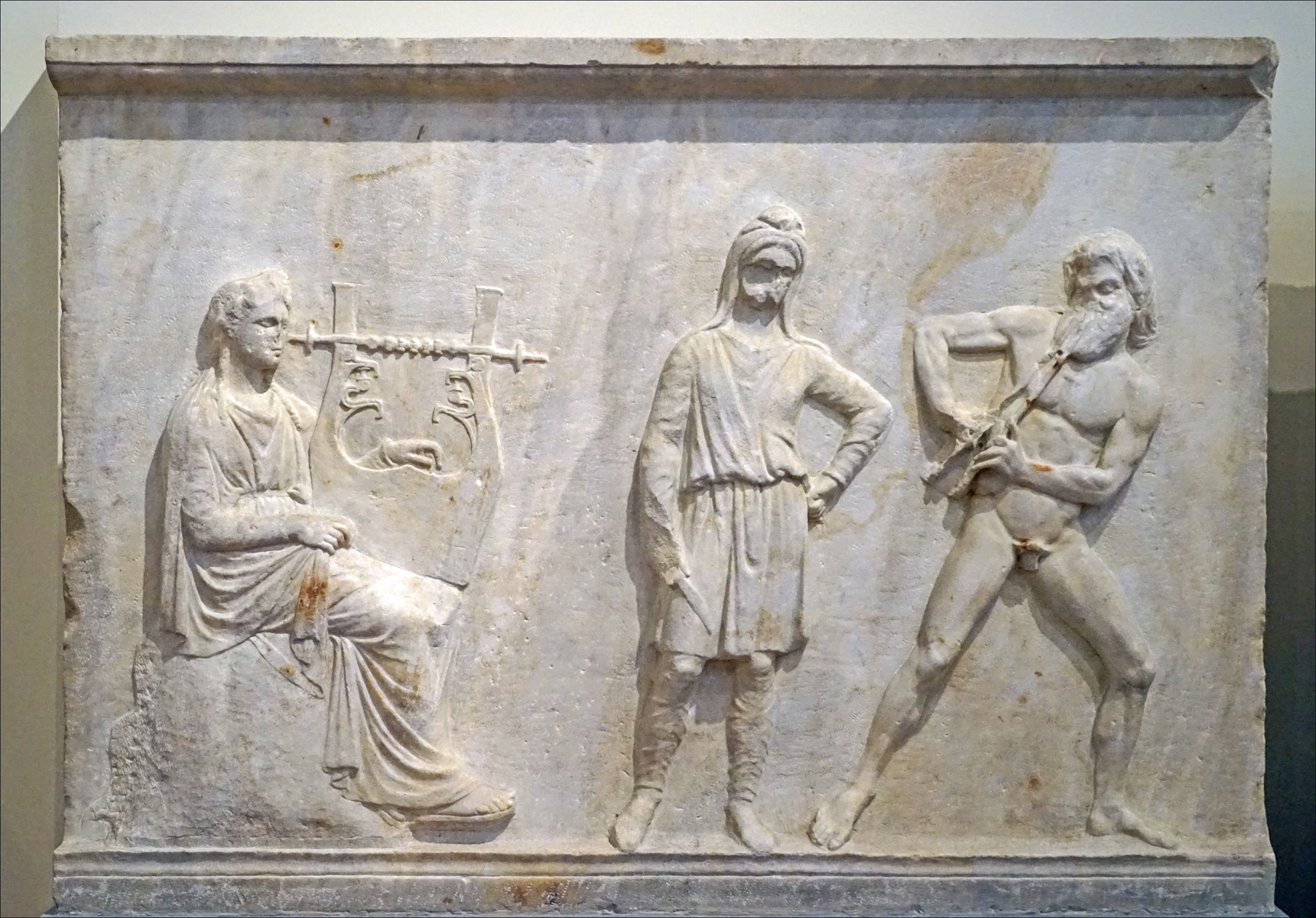
Mantineia Base depicting the contest of Apollo and Marsyas, c. 330–320 BC, NAMA.

Marsyas was claimed as the eponym of the Marsi as well, one of the ancient peoples of Italy. The Social War of 91–88 BC, in which the Italian peoples fought to advance their status as citizens under Roman rule, is sometimes called the Marsic War because of the leadership of the Marsi. The Roman coloniae Paestum and Alba Fucens, along with other Italian cities, set up their own statues of Marsyas as assertions of their political status.

During the Principate, Marsyas became a subversive symbol in opposition to Augustus, whose propaganda systematically associated Augustus with Apollo as the torturer of sileni. Augustus's daughter Julia held nocturnal assemblies at the statue, and crowned it to defy her father. The poet Ovid, who was ultimately exiled by Augustus, twice tells the story of Marsyas's flaying by Apollo, in his epic Metamorphoses and in the Fasti, the calendrical poem left unfinished at his death. Although the immediate cause of Ovid's exile remains one of literary history's great mysteries, Ovid says that a "poem and transgression" were contributing factors; his poetry tests the boundaries of permissible free speech during Rome's transition from republic to imperial monarchy.

Pliny indicates that in the first century AD, the painting Marsyas religatus ("Marsyas Bound"), by Zeuxis of Heraclea, could be viewed at the Temple of Concordia in Rome. The goddess Concordia, like the Greek Harmonia, was a personification of both musical harmony as it was understood in antiquity, and of social order, as expressed by Cicero's phrase concordia ordinum. The apparent incongruity of exhibiting the tortured silenus in a temple devoted to harmony has been interpreted in modern scholarship as a warning against criticizing authority.

=== The Louvre's Apollo–Marsyas sarcophagus ===
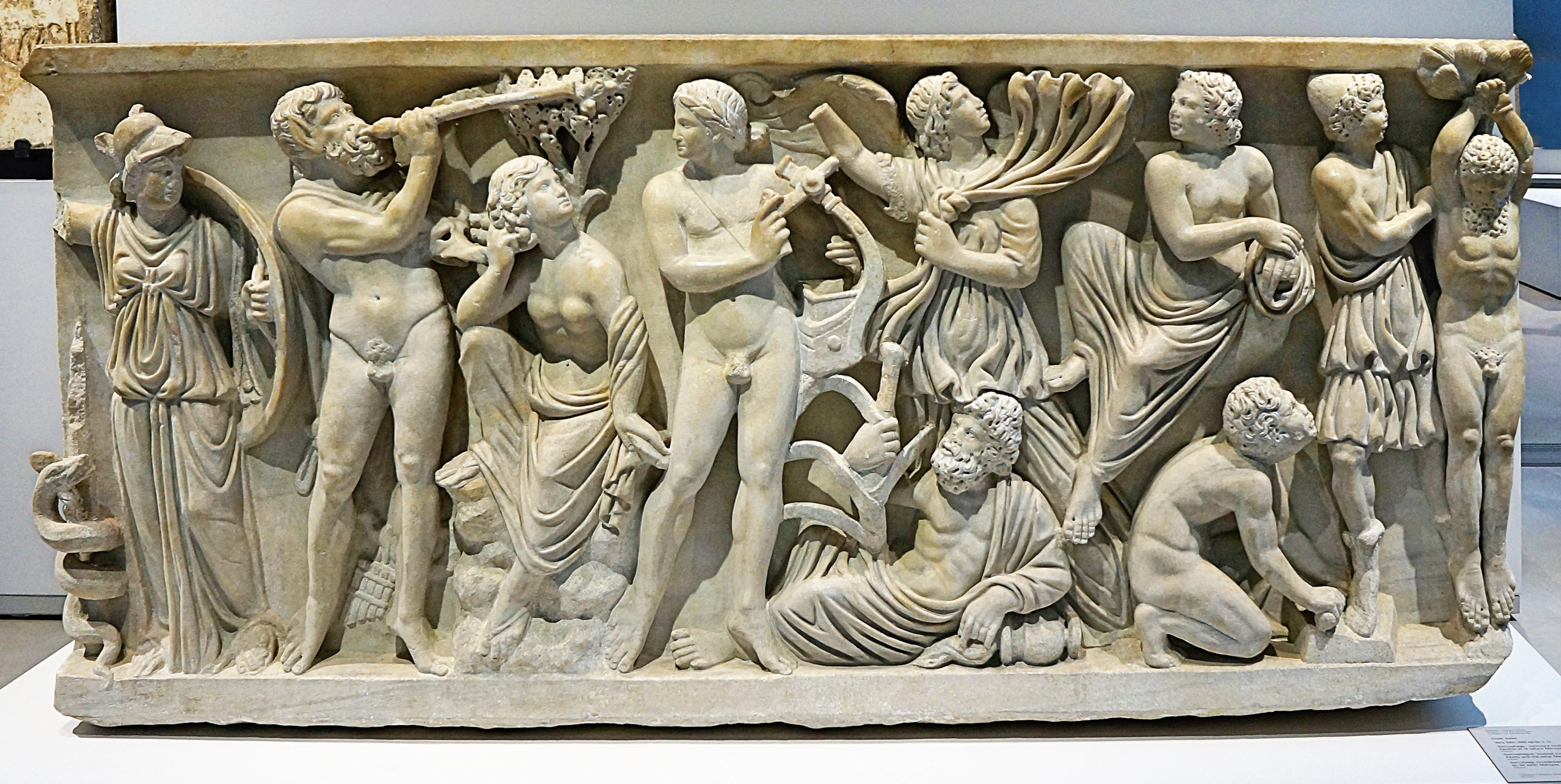
Competition between Marsyas and Apollo, Tuscan marble sarcophagus, c. 290–300 CE, (Louvre).

A sarcophagus depicting the competition between Marsyas and Apollo, dating to around 300 CE, was discovered in 1853 on the bank of the river Chiarone in Tuscany, on the former Emilia-Aurelia road. Its gathering of deities reads visually from left to right, starting from Athena with her staff and Erichthonius, forming her caduceus, which is partially broken along with a portion of her arm. In Greek myth, Athena was once associated with the pipes that later became those of Marsyas, so that other narratives were developed explaining the transfer as Athena having discarded the instrument in a pique (as in Ovid's Metamorphoses). The flaying of Marsyas is set on the end opposite to Athena, on the extreme right.

== In later arts ==
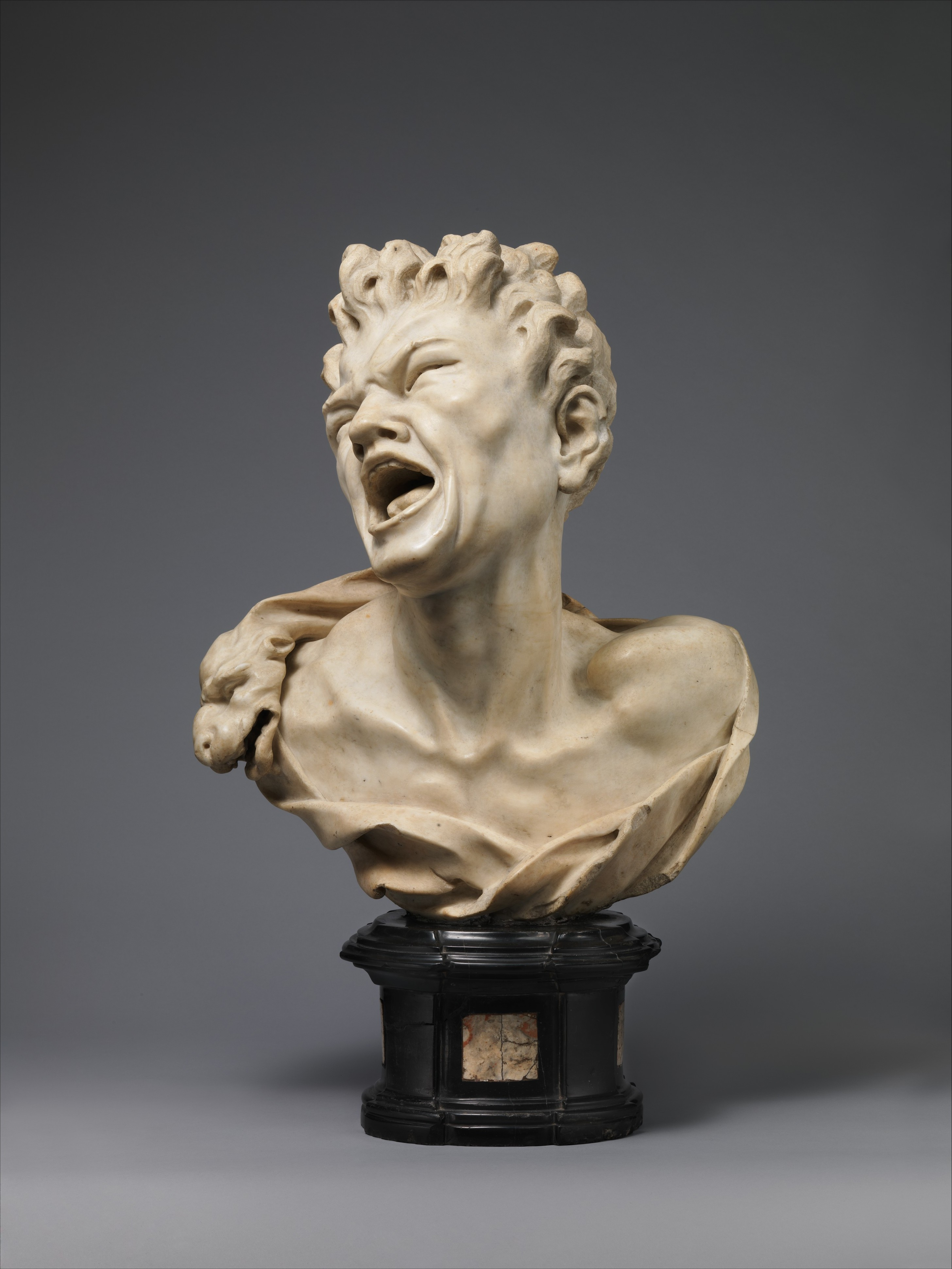
Permoser's bust of Marsyas (1680–1685).

In the art of later periods, allegory is applied to gloss over the somewhat ambivalent morality of the flaying of Marsyas. Marsyas is often seen with a flute, pan pipes, or even bagpipes. Apollo is shown with his lyre, or sometimes a harp, viol, or other stringed instrument. The contest of Apollo and Marsyas is seen as symbolizing the eternal struggle between the Apollonian and Dionysian aspects of human nature and cultures.

Paintings taking Marsyas as a subject include "Apollo and Marsyas" by Michelangelo Anselmi (c. 1492 – c.1554), "The Flaying of Marsyas" by Jusepe de Ribera (1591–1652), the Flaying of Marsyas by Titian (c. 1570–1576), "Apollo and Marsyas" by Bartolomeo Manfredi (St. Louis Art Museum), and "Apollo and Marsyas" by Luca Giordano (c.1665).

James Merrill based a poem, "Marsyas", on this myth; it appears in The Country of a Thousand Years of Peace (1959). Zbigniew Herbert and Nadine Sabra Meyer each entitled poems "Apollo and Marsyas". Following Ovid's retelling of the Apollo and Marsyas tale, the poem "The Flaying Of Marsyas" features in Robin Robertson's 1997 collection "a painted field".

Hugo Claus based his poem, Marsua (included in the 1955 poem collection Oostakkerse Gedichten), on the myth of Marsyas, describing the process of flaying from the perspective of Marsyas.

In 2002, British artist Anish Kapoor created and installed an enormous sculpture in London's Tate Modern entitled Marsyas. Consisting of three huge steel rings and a single red PVC membrane, the work was impossible to view as a whole because of its size, but had obvious anatomical connotations.

A bridge that was built toward the end of the Roman period on the river Marsyas is still called by the satyr's name, Marsiyas.

The late composer Kyle Rieger wrote a duet for saxophone and piano based on the contest between Marsyas and Apollo titled "Aulos & Lyre".

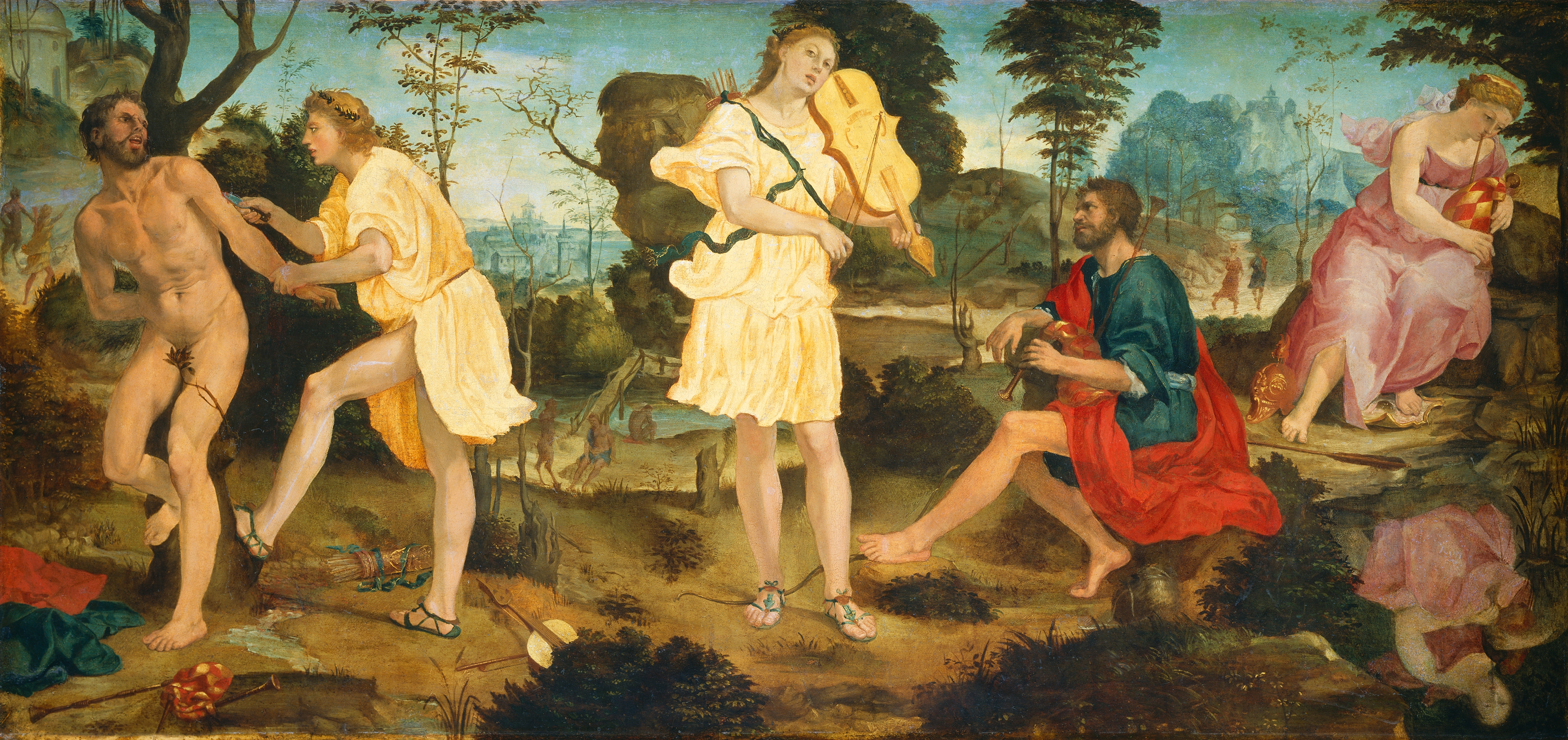
Apollo and Marsyas by Michelangelo Anselmi

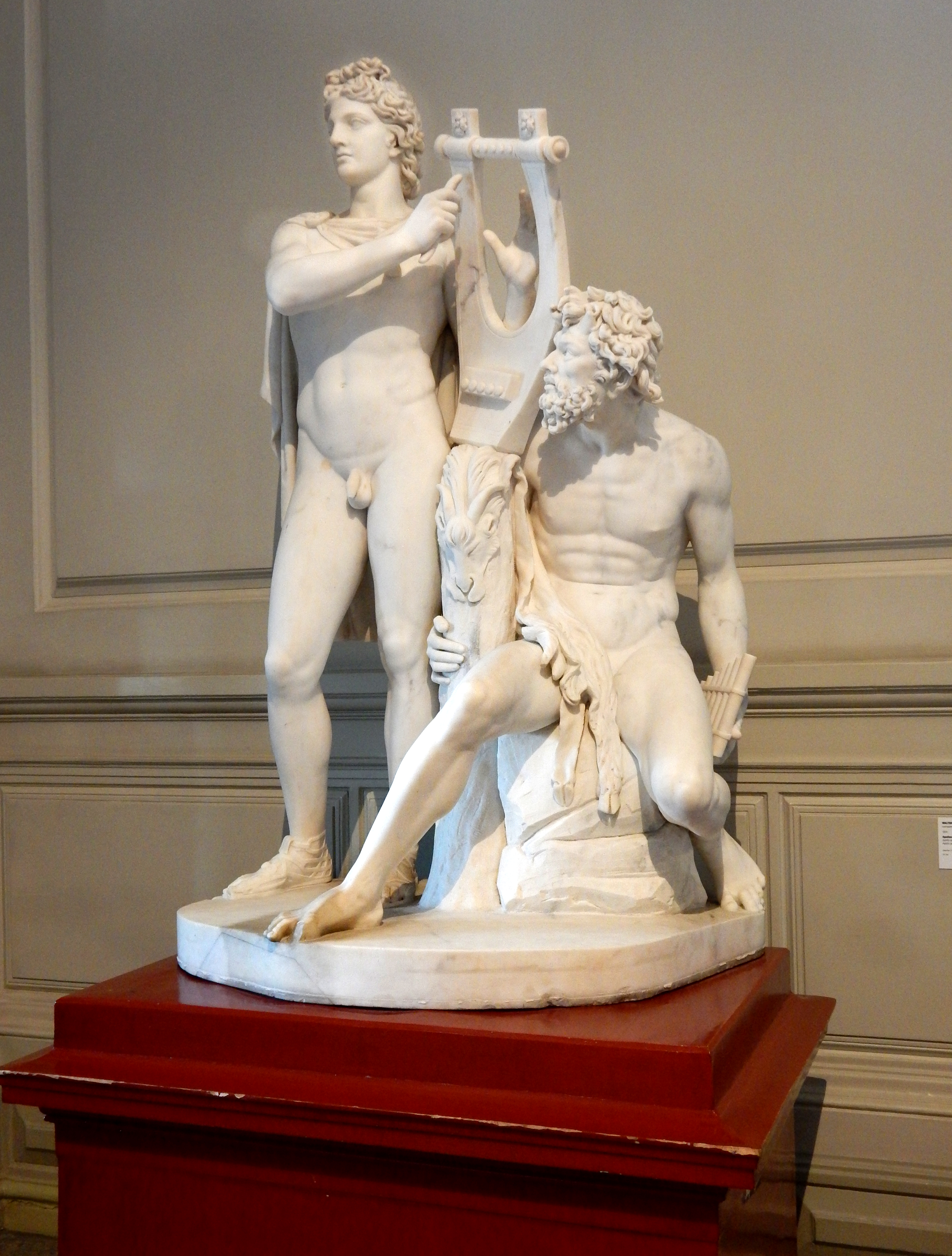
A marble sculpture of Apollo and Marsyas by Walter Runeberg at the arrivals hall of Ateneum in Helsinki, Finland

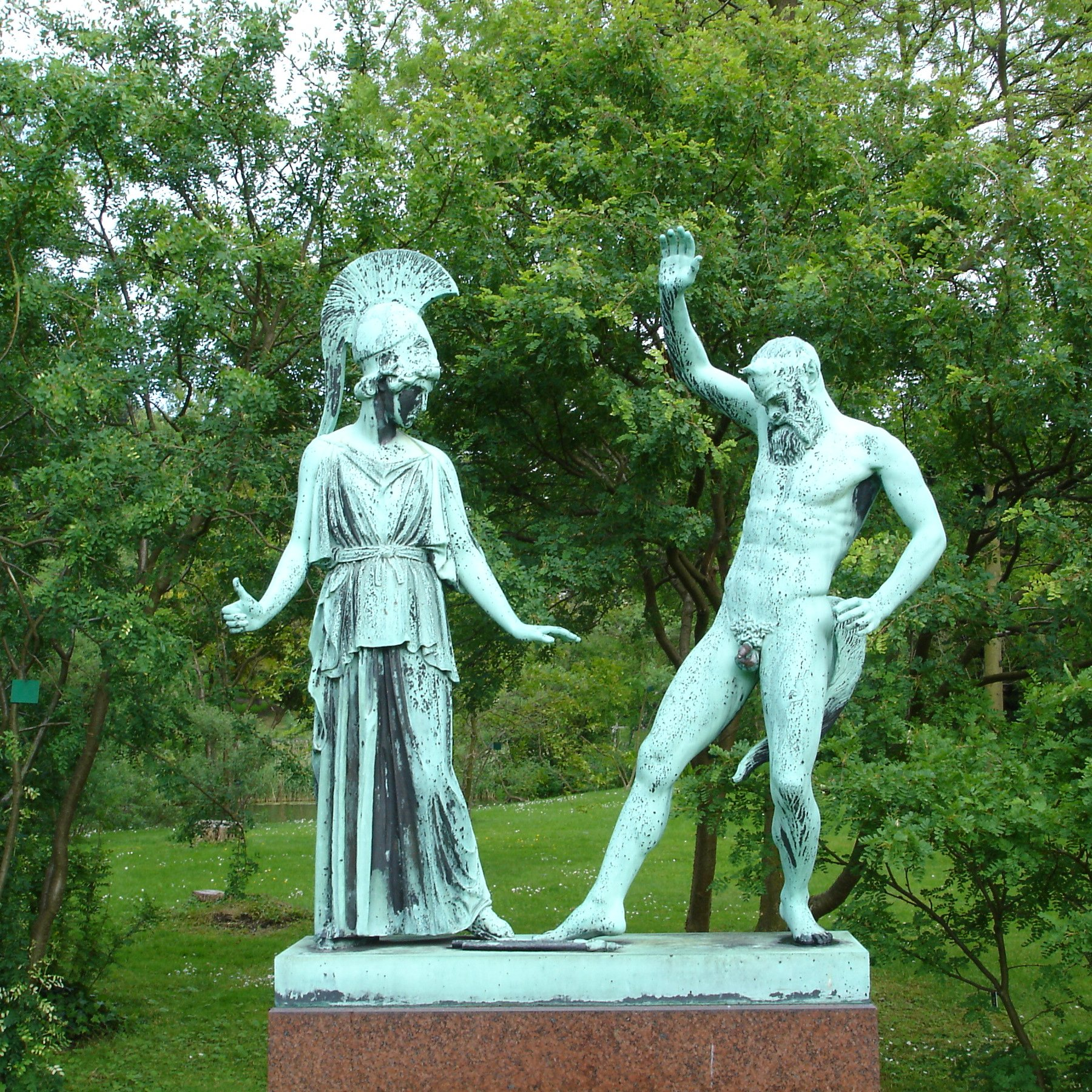
Athena and Marsyas: the discovery of the aulos in an imaginative recreation of a lost bronze by Myron (Botanic Garden, Copenhagen)

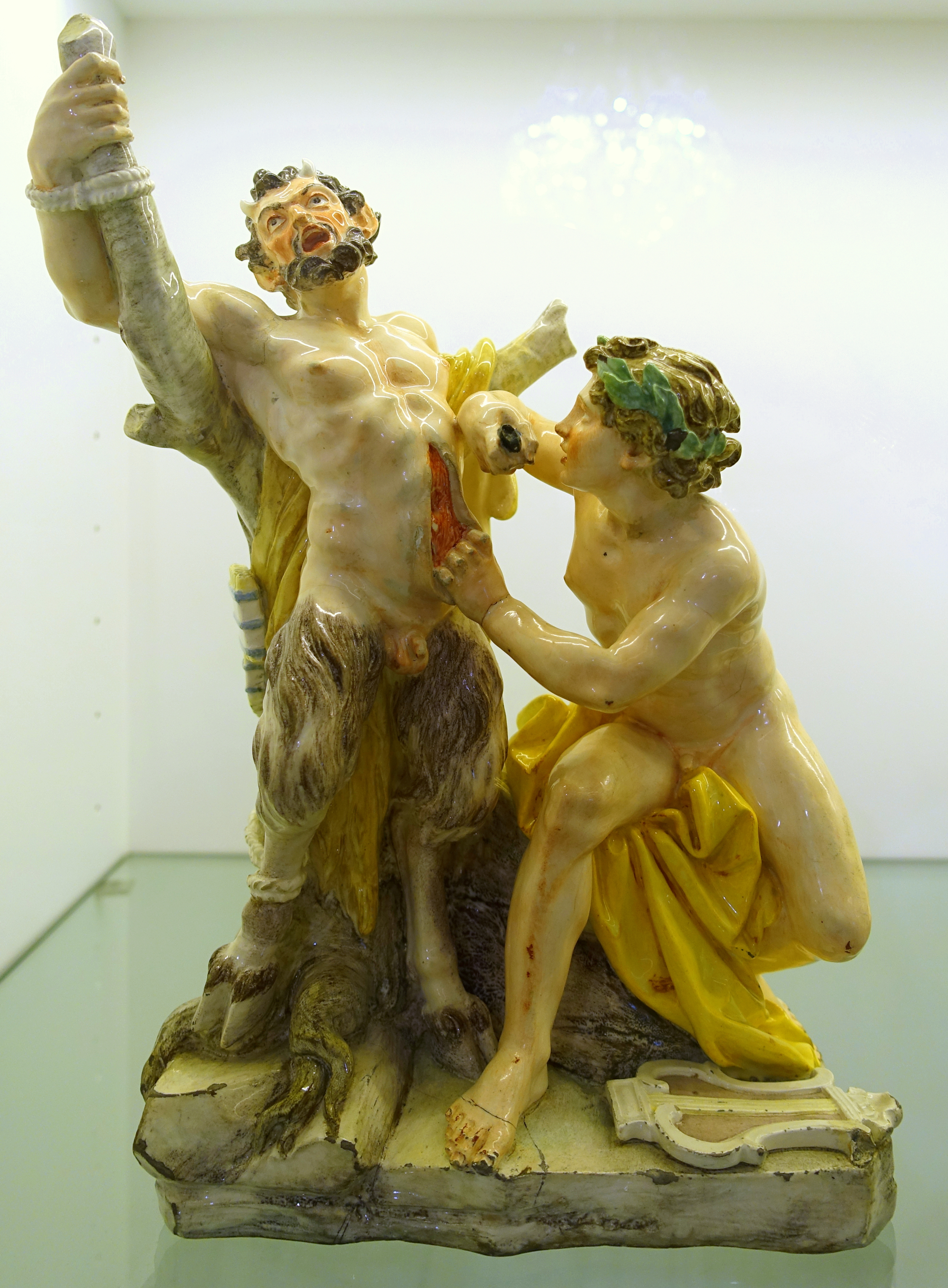
Apollo and Marsyas, porcelain from Real Fábrica del Buen Retiro, 1760s.

== See also ==
- Arachne, a mortal woman who engaged in a weaving contest with Athena
- Babys (mythology), Brother of the satyr Marsyas, who also entered into a musical competition with Apollo
