= Tralles (disambiguation) =

Tralles was a city of ancient Caria, now occupied by Aydın, Turkey.

Tralles may also refer to:

- Tralles (crater), a crater on the Moon
- Tralles (diocese), a Roman Catholic diocese
- Tralles (Lydia), a town of ancient Lydia
- Tralles (Phrygia), a town of ancient Phrygia
- Tralles (Thracian tribe), an ancient Thracian tribe
