= Seikilos epitaph =

Oldest surviving complete piece of music

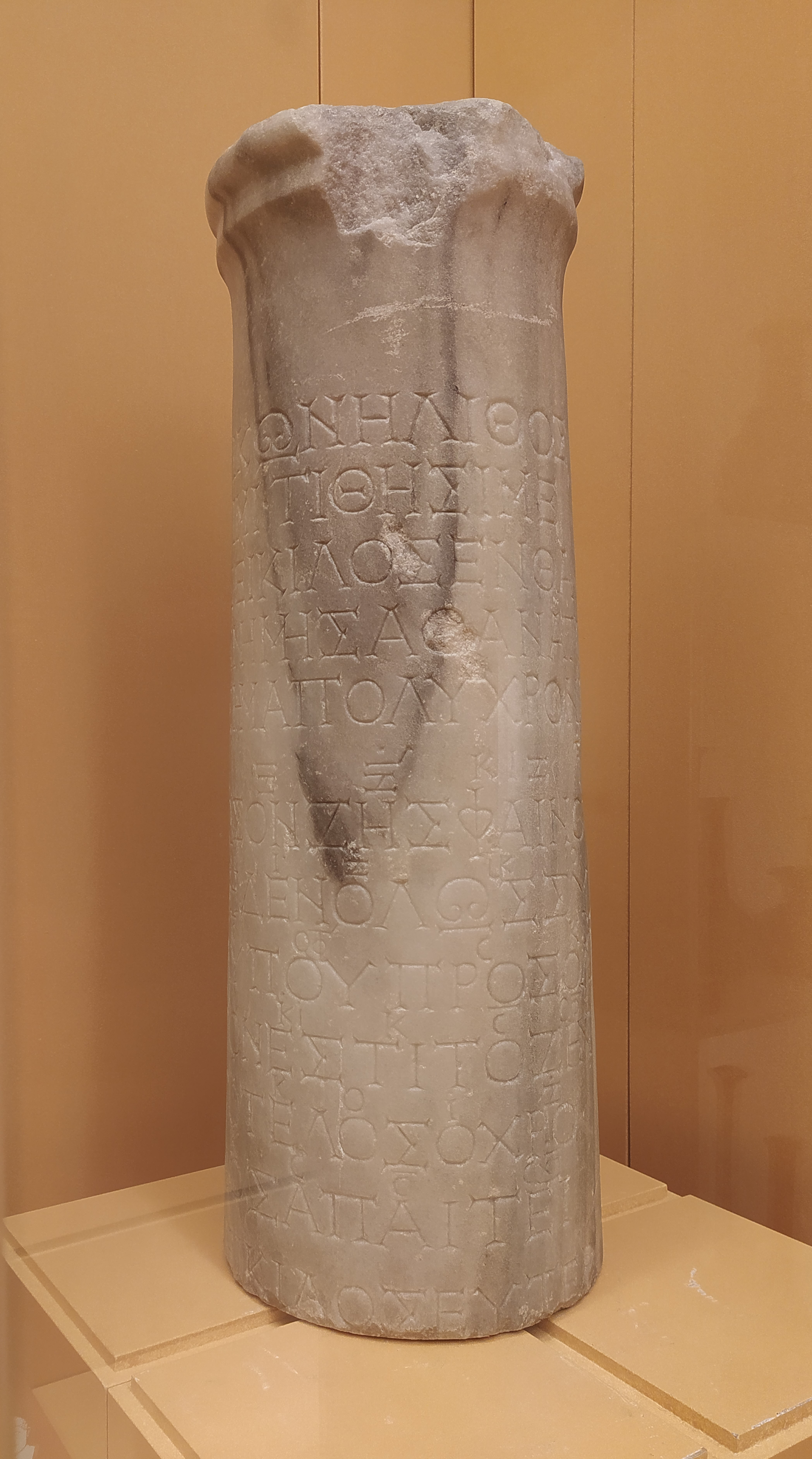
- Seikilos stele with poetry and musical notation
- Type: Stele
- Material: Marble
- Writing: Koine Greek
- Created: c. 1st or 2nd century AD, Tralles, Asia Minor
- Discovered: 1883
- Discovered by: W. M. Ramsay
- Present location: National Museum of Denmark

The Seikilos epitaph is an Ancient Greek inscription that preserves the oldest surviving complete musical composition, including musical notation. Commonly dated between the 1st and 2nd century AD, the inscription was found engraved on a pillar (stele) from the ancient Greek town of Tralles (modern Aydın in present-day Turkey) in 1883. The stele includes two poems; an elegiac distich and a song with vocal notation signs above the words. A Hellenistic Ionic song, it is either in the Phrygian octave species or Ionian (Iastian) tonos. The melody of the song is recorded, alongside its lyrics, in ancient Greek musical notation. While older music with notation exists (e.g. the Hurrian songs or the Delphic Hymns), all of it is in fragments; the Seikilos epitaph is unique in that it is a complete, though short, composition.

Based on its structure and language, the artifact is generally understood to have been an epitaph (a tombstone inscription) created by a man named Seikilos and possibly dedicated to a woman named Euterpe. An alternative view, put forward by Armand D'Angour, holds that the inscription does not mark a tomb, but was instead a monument erected by Seikilos himself to commemorate his musical and poetic skill.

== Artifact ==
The Sekilos stele is an inscribed marble column from the ancient settlement of Tralles in western Anatolia, in what is now the city of Aydın, Turkey. Serving as a gravestone, it bears an elegiac distich (a form of Ancient Greek poetry) and a song transcribed in Ancient Greek musical notation.

=== Discovery ===
The epitaph was discovered sometime around 1883 by British engineer Edward Purser during the construction of a railroad in Aydın, Turkey. In 1883, the archaeologist William Mitchell Ramsay published a description of the epitaph in the Bulletin de correspondance hellénique. (Note: Classicist John G. Landels instead describes the stele as discovered by Ramsay himself in 1883, before being rediscovered in private possession near İzmir in 1922.) A rubbing was made of the inscription at some point prior to 1893, and was published in 1894 by French archaeologist Théodore Reinach. The base of the stele was in a damaged state; wishing to use it as a pedestal for his wife's flowerpots, Purser had the bottom of the pillar sawed flat so it would stand steadily. This destroyed a line of text on the monument, which is only documented via the earlier rubbing. The pillar later passed to the private collection of De Jongh, Purser's son-in-law, in nearby Buca.

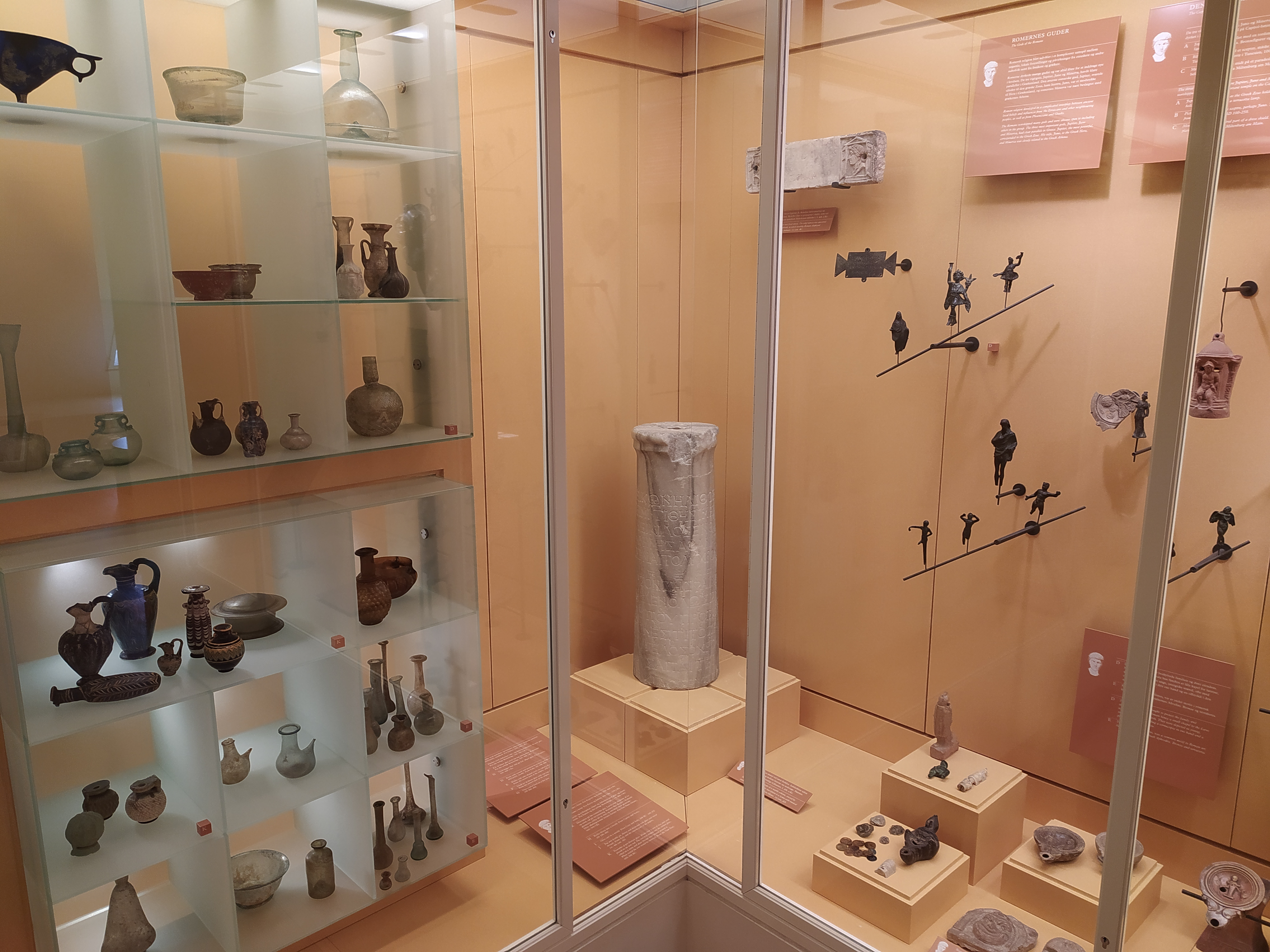
The stele along with other exhibits at the National Museum of Denmark

The Dutch Consul in İzmir protected the stele during the 1922 Burning of Smyrna in the Greco-Turkish War. The consul's son-in-law transported it, via stops in Istanbul and Stockholm, to The Hague, where it remained until 1966. Presumed lost, it was acquired by the Department of Antiquities of the National Museum of Denmark in Copenhagen and revealed in December of the following year. The stele continues to be showcased at the museum.

=== Dating ===
The find has been variously dated, but the first or second century AD is the most probable guess. One authority states that on grounds of paleography the inscription can be "securely dated to the first century C.E.", while on the same basis (the use of swallow-tail serifs, the almost triangular Φ with prolongation below, ligatures between N, H, and M, and above all the peculiar form of the letter omega) another is equally certain it dates from the second century AD, and makes comparisons to dated inscriptions of 127/128 AD and 149/150 AD.

== Inscription ==
=== Distich ===
The elegiac distich (also called couplet) was written on top of the tombstone and precedes the song. Originally in all-capitals (followed below by the polytonic lowercase and Latin transliteration), it reads:

ΕΙΚΩΝ Η ΛΙΘΟΣ / ΕΙΜΙ ∙ ΤΙΘΗΣΙ ΜΕ / ΣΕΙΚΙΛΟΣ ΕΝΘΑ / ΜΝΗΜΗΣ ΑΘΑΝΑΤΟΥ / ΣΗΜΑ ΠΟΛΥΧΡΟΝΙΟΝ

Εἰκὼν ἡ λίθος εἰμί. τίθησί με Σεικίλος ἔνθα μνήμης ἀθανάτου σῆμα πολυχρόνιον.
eikṑn ḗ líthos eimí. títhēsí me Seikílos éntha mnḗmēs athanátou sêma polykhrónion.

Per Landels (2002), (Note: Landels 1999, p. 252; See also Rohland 2022, p. 2) the distich translates in English as:

"I, the stone, am an image and Seikilos places me here (to be) a long-lasting monument to immortal memory"

D'Angour (2021) maintains that the translation of the letter "Η" (Eta) as "the" (ἡ) results in an awkward phrasing in Greek, and thus prefers the conjunctive "and" (ἤ), which translates as "I am an image and a stone; Seikilos sets me up here as a long-lasting marker of undying memory". In all cases, the language of the distich implies that the stone should be imagined as speaking to the reader in first person and in the present tense; a familiar structure that is commonly found in ancient epitaphs, where the stone appears to 'speak' to the passer-by (see the epitaph of Simonides).

=== Epitaph ===
Below the distich follows a brief poem, also in all-capitals, with vocal notation signs above the words. The text, here excluding the musical notations (followed below by the polytonic script and Latin transliteration), reads:

ΟΣΟΝ ΖΗΣ ΦΑΙΝΟΥ / ΜΗΔΕΝ ΟΛΩΣ ΣΥ / ΛΥΠΟΥ ΠΡΟΣ ΟΛΙ / ΓΟΝ ΕΣΤΙ ΤΟ ΖΗΝ / ΤΟ ΤΕΛΟΣ Ο ΧΡΟ / ΝΟΣ ΑΠΑΙΤΕΙ

ὅσον ζῇς, φαίνου | μηδὲν ὅλως σὺ λυποῦ | πρὸς ὀλίγον ἔστι τὸ ζῆν | τὸ τέλος ὁ χρόνος ἀπαιτεῖ.
[ˈoson] [ze̝s], [ˈpʰɛnu] | [me̝ˈden] [ˈolos] [sy] [ˈlypu] | [pros] [oˈliɡon] [ˈesti] [to] [ze̝n] | [to] [ˈtelos] [o] [ˈkʰronos] [aˈpɛti]
hóson zêis, phaínou | mēdèn hólōs sỳ lypoû | pròs olígon ésti tò zên | tò télos ho khrónos apaiteî.

In English the poem translates as: "As long as you're alive, shine, don't be sad at all; life is short, time asks for its due" per Rohland (2022). Landels (1999) provides the alternative translation: "As long as you live, let the world see you, and don't make yourself miserable; life is short, and Time demands his due".

=== Dedication ===
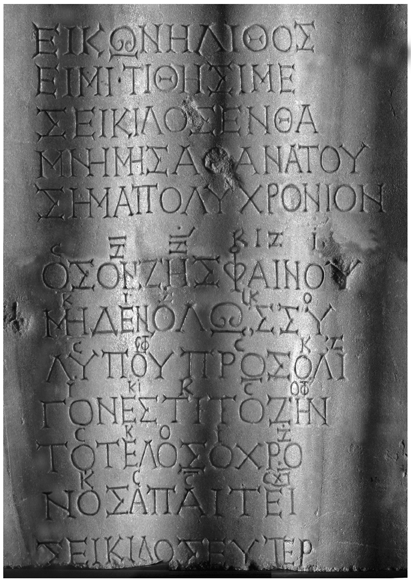
The inscription as it currently exists (without the original final line 'ZEI')

Before the last line was ground off so Mrs. Purser (the wife of the discoverer) could use the stele as a flowerpot stand, the dedication read:

ΣΕΙΚΙΛΟΣ ΕΥΤΕΡ
[...]ΖΕΙ[...]

The verb 'ζει' zei, meaning "is alive", was a common ancient convention indicating that the dedicator had survived the dedicatee and created the monument in their memory. The last two surviving words on the tombstone itself are (with the bracketed characters denoting a partial possible reconstruction of the lacuna or of a possible name abbreviation)

Σεικίλος Εὐτέρ[πῃ]
Seikílos Eutér[pēi]

meaning "Seikilos to Euterpe"; hence, according to this reconstruction, the tombstone and the epigrams thereon were dedicated by Seikilos to a woman named Euterpe, who was possibly his wife. Alternatively, the inscription references Euterpe, the Muse of lyric poetry and music in Greek mythology, as a way to emphasize Seikilos' poetic skill. Another possible partial reconstruction could be:

Σεικίλος Εὐτέρ[που]
Seikílos Eutér[pou]

meaning "Seikilos of Euterpes", i.e. "Seikilos, son of Euterpes".

=== Word accent ===
A German scholar Otto Crusius in 1893, shortly after the publication of the inscription, was the first to observe that the music of this song as well as that of the hymns of Mesomedes tends to follow the pitch of the word accents. The publication of the two Delphic hymns in the same year confirmed this tendency. Thus in this epitaph, in most of the words, the accented syllable is higher in pitch than the syllable which follows; and the circumflex accents in λυποῦ lupoû, ζῆν zên and ἀπαιτεῖ apaiteî have a falling contour within the syllable, just as described by the 1st century BC rhetorician Dionysius of Halicarnassus, while the first syllable of φαίνου phaínou (a long vowel with an acute accent) has a rising melody.

One word which does not conform is the first word ὅσον hóson, where the music has a low note despite the acute accent. Another example of a low note at the beginning of a line which has been observed is βαῖν᾽ ἐπὶ baîn᾽ epì in the 2nd Delphic Hymn. There are other places also where the initial syllable of a clause starts on a low note in the music.

Another apparently anomalous word is ἐστὶ estì 'is', where the music has a rising melody on the first syllable. However, there exists a second pronunciation ἔστι ésti, which is used, according to Philomen Probert, "when the word expresses existence or possibility (i.e. when it is translatable with expressions such as 'exists', 'there is', or 'it is possible')", which is evidently the meaning here.

== Melody ==
=== Transcription ===
The inscription above each line of the lyrics (transcribed here in polytonic script), consists of letters and signs indicating the melody of the song:

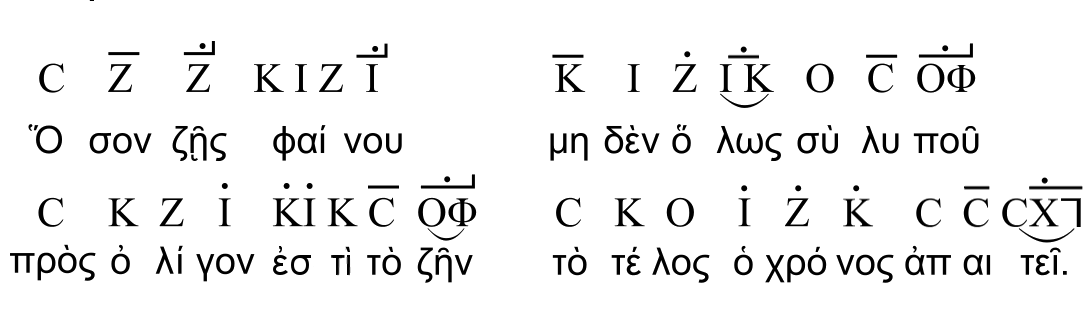
The Seikilos "score"

An approximate translation of the tune into modern musical notation, with the original text, a romanization, and a rough word-for-word translation giving an indication of the meaning of each word. The original tune was a fourth lower (Iastian key).

=== Scholarly views ===
Epitaph of Seikilos
Melody sung in an approximation of Koine Greek pronunciation and in modern popular vocal style; a mix of both rhythmizations (see § An alternative rhythmization, below) is used.

Although the transcription of the melody is unproblematic, there is some disagreement about the nature of the melodic material itself. There are no modulations, and the notation is clearly in the diatonic genus, but while it is described by Thomas J. Mathiesen and Jon Solomon on the one hand as being clearly in the diatonic Iastian tonos, Mathiesen also says it would "fit perfectly" within Ptolemy's Phrygian tonos, since, according to Jon Solomon, the arrangement of the tones (1 ½ 1 1 1 ½ 1 [ascending]) "is that of the Phrygian species" according to Cleonides. The overall note series is alternatively described by Egert Pöhlmann and Martin Litchfield West as corresponding "to a segment from the Ionian scale". R. P. Winnington-Ingram says "The scale employed is the diatonic octave from e to e (in two sharps). The tonic seems to be a; the cadence is a f♯ e. This piece is … [in] Phrygic (the D mode) with its tonic in the same relative position as that of the Doric." Yet Claude Palisca explains that the difficulty lies in the fact that "the harmoniai had no finals, dominants, or internal relationships that would establish a hierarchy of tensions and points of rest, although the mese ('middle note') may have had a gravitational function". Although the epitaph's melody is "clearly structured around a single octave, … the melody emphasizes the mese by position … rather than the mese by function". Moreover, Charles Cosgrove, building on West, shows that although the notes correspond to the Phrygian octave species, analyzing the song on the assumption that its orientation notes are the standing notes of a set of disjunct tetrachords forming the Phrygian octave species does not sufficiently illumine the melody's tonal structure. The song's pitch centers (notes of emphasis according to frequency, duration, and placement) are, in Greek notational nomenclature, C and Z, which correspond to G and D if the scale is mapped on the white keys of the piano (A and E in the "two sharps" transcription above). These two pitches are mese and nete diezeugmenon of the octave species, but the two other standing notes of that scale's tetrachords (hypate and paramese) do not come into play in significant ways as pitch centers, whether individually or together in intervals forming fourths. The melody is dominated by fifths and thirds; and although the piece ends on hypate, that is the only occurrence of this note. This instance of hypate probably derives its suitability as a final by virtue of being "the same," through octave equivalency, as nete diezeugmenon, the pitch center Z.

=== Stigmai ===
The musical notation has certain dots above it, called stigmai (στιγμαί), singular stigmē (στιγμή), which are also found in certain other fragments of Greek music, such as the fragment from Euripides' Orestes. The meaning of these is still uncertain. According to an ancient source (known as the Anonymus Bellermanni), they represent an 'arsis', which has been taken to mean a kind of 'upbeat' ('arsis' means 'raising' in Greek); Armand D'Angour argues, however, that this does not rule out the possibility of a dynamic stress. Another view, by Solomon, is that the stigmai "signify a rhythmical emphasis". According to Mathiesen,

The meaning of the stigme has been debated for years by scholars. Is it an ictus mark, does it indicate stress, does it show arsis or thesis, and which part of the foot ought to be called arsis?

A stigme appears on all the syllables of the second half of each bar as it is printed above (for example on ὅλως, -γον ἔσ-, and ὁ χρόνος). If the Anonymus Bellermanni source is correct, this implies that whole of the first half of each double-foot bar or measure is the thesis, and the whole of the second half is the arsis. Stefan Hagel, however, argues that this does not preclude the possibility that within the thesis and arsis there was a further hierarchy of strong and weak notes.

=== Alternative rhythmization ===
A possible alternative way of rhythmizing the Seikilos song, in order to preserve the iambic ('rising', di-dum) feel of the rhythm, was suggested by classicist and musician Armand D'Angour, with the barlines displaced one quaver to the right, as in the following transcription:

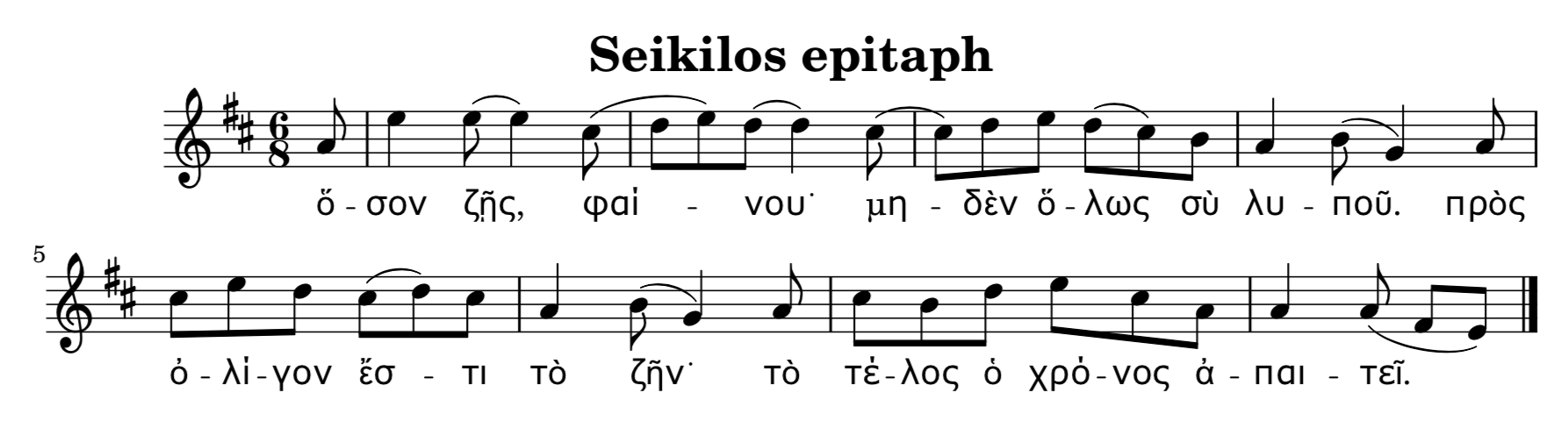
A variation of the Seikilos epitaph with barlines as suggested by Armand D'Angour (2018)

Stefan Hagel, discussing an example in the Anonymus Bellermanni, suggests the possibility of a similar transcription with displaced barlines of a line of music with this same rhythm. His hypothesis is based on an assumption about ancient rhythmical theory and practice, namely that "the regular iambic environment precluded accented shorts altogether; in other words, the accent of the iambic foot fell on its long".

However, Tosca Lynch argues that this assumption is contradicted by ancient rhythmical theory and practice. She notes that the song in its conventional transcription corresponds to the rhythm referred to by ancient Greek rhythmicians as an "iambic dactyl" (δάκτυλος κατ᾽ ἴαμβον (dáktulos kat᾽ íambon) (⏑⏔ ⁝ ⏑⏔) (using the term "dactyl" in the rhythmicians' sense of a foot in which the two parts are of equal length) (cf. Aristides Quintilianus 38.5–6). According to this, the whole of the first half of each bar (e.g. ὅσον hóson) is the thesis, and the whole of the second (ζῇς zêis), as the stigmai imply, is the arsis. Therefore, in Lynch's opinion the conventional transcription is to be preferred as it accurately reflects the original rhythm.

== Sources ==
- Cosgrove, Charles H.; Meyer, Mary C. (2006). "Melody and Word Accent Relationships in Ancient Greek Musical Documents: The Pitch Height Rule". The Journal of Hellenic Studies. 126: 68–81. doi:10.1017/S0075426900007667.
- Cosgrove, Charles H. (2011). An Ancient Christian Hymn with Musical Notation: Papyrus Oxyrhynchus 1786: Text and Commentary. Heidelberg: Mohr Siebeck Verlag. ISBN 9783161509230.
- Cosgrove, Charles H. (2022). Music at Social Meals in Greek and Roman Antiquity: From the Archaic Period to the Age of Augustine. Cambridge University Press. doi:10.1017/9781009161060. ISBN 9781009161060.
- D'Angour, Armand (2018b). "Hearing Ancient Sounds Through Modern Ears". In Butler, Shane; Nooter, Sarah (eds.). Sound and the Ancient Senses. London: Routledge. pp. 31–43. doi:10.4324/9781315648248. ISBN 9781315648248.
- D'Angour, Armand (2018). "The Song of Seikilos". In Phillips, Tom; D'Angour, Armand (eds.). Music, Text, and Culture in Ancient Greece. Oxford University Press. pp. 64–72. ISBN 9780198794462.
- D'Angour, Armand (2021). "The Song of Seikilos: a Musically Notated Ancient Greek Poem". Antigone Journal.
- Devine, A. M.; Stephens, Laurence D. (1994). The Prosody of Greek Speech. Oxford University Press. ISBN 9780195373356.
- Hagel, Stefan (2008). "Ancient Greek Rhythm: The Bellermann Exercises". Quaderni Urbinati di Cultura Classica. 88 (1). JSTOR 20546457.
- Landels, John G. (1999). Music in Ancient Greece and Rome. London: Routledge. ISBN 9781134704873.
- Lynch, Tosca A. C. (2020). Lynch, Tosca A. C.; Rocconi, Eleonora (eds.). A Companion to Ancient Greek and Roman Music. Hoboken: Wiley-Blackwell. doi:10.1002/9781119275510. ISBN 9781119275473.
- Matheisen, Thomas J. (1981). "New Fragments of Ancient Greek Music". Acta Musicologica. 53 (1): 14–32. doi:10.2307/932567. JSTOR 932567.
- Matheisen, Thomas J. (1985). "Rhythm and Meter in Ancient Greek Music". Music Theory Spectrum. 7: 159–180. doi:10.2307/745886. JSTOR 745886.
- Mathiesen, Thomas J. (1999). Apollo's Lyre: Greek Music and Music Theory in Antiquity and the Middle Ages. Lincoln: University of Nebraska Press. ISBN 9780803230798.
- Palisca, Claude V. (2006). Music and Ideas in the Sixteenth and Seventeenth Centuries. Champaign: University of Illinois Press. doi:10.5406/j.ctt1xcmq8. ISBN 9780252031564. JSTOR 10.5406/j.ctt1xcmq8.
- Pöhlmann, Egert (1970). Denkmäler Altgriechischer Musik: Sammlung, Übertragung und Erläuterung Aller Fragmente und Fälschungen [Monuments of Ancient Greek Music: Collection, Translation and Explanation of all Fragments and Forgeries] (in German). Nuremberg: Hans Carl. OCLC 62410676.
- Pöhlmann, Egert; West, Martin Litchfield (2001). Documents of Ancient Greek Music: The Extant Melodies and Fragments. Oxford University Press. ISBN 9780198152231.
- Probert, Philomen (2003). A New Short Guide the Accentuation of Ancient Greek. Bristol Classical Press. ISBN 9781853995996.
- Randel, Don Michael, ed. (2003). The Harvard Dictionary of Music (4th ed.). Cambridge: Harvard University Press. ISBN 9780674011632.
- Rohland, Robert (2022). Carpe Diem, The Poetics of Presence in Greek and Latin Literature. Cambridge University Press. ISBN 9781316510827.
- Solomon, Jon D. (1986). "The Seikilos Inscription: A Theoretical Analysis". American Journal of Philology. 107 (4): 455–479. JSTOR 295097.
- Winnington-Ingram, Reginald P. (1929). "Ancient Greek Music: A Survey". Music & Letters. 10 (4): 326–345. JSTOR 726126.
