= Anonymus Bellermanni =

Manuscript featuring Ancient Greek music

The Anonymus Bellermanni is a collection of material on music, by one or more unknown authors, transmitted in a number of Byzantine manuscripts and first published by Johann Friedrich Bellermann in 1841. Martin West comments: "It is drawn to a marked extent from Aristoxenus and Aristides Quintilianus but contains some valuable matter not found elsewhere, including half a dozen little instrumental tunes and exercises." Along with four poems attributed to Mesomedes, and not counting various fragments on papyrus, it is one of the only examples where a piece of ancient Greek music has survived in the manuscript tradition.

The six short fragments of music are in an appendix to the document. Two of these are very short, and one is an ascending and descending octave scale. They are notated in the type of notation used for instrumental music, and appear to have been designed for people learning to play, almost certainly on the double pipe known as an aulos.

Among other things, the document explains the symbols used in music for notes which are extended to two, three, four, and five time-units (disemes, trisemes, tetrasemes, and pentasemes). The last two are not attested except in the Anonymus Bellermanni.

Other symbols mentioned in the treatise are the symbol for a musical rest (shaped Λ), and the stigmai or dots above the note-symbols, which apparently indicate the arsis of the foot. Examples of such stigmai are also found in the Seikilos epitaph and elsewhere.

The six different musical examples are of different levels of rhythmic complexity. §100 (headed tetrasēmos) has bars of four time-units; §97 and §104 contain bars of 6 time-units (hexasēmos); §98 and §99 have eleven and twelve time-units in each bar; §101 is headed "of eight time-units" (oktasēmos) in the manuscript, but judging from the music which follows, this was plausibly emended to "of eighteen time-units" (oktōkaidekasēmos) by E. Pöhlmann.

== Notes ==
Sources

- Hagel, Stefan (2008). "Ancient Greek Rhythm: The Bellermann Exercises". Quaderni Urbinati di Cultura Classica, New Series, Vol. 88, No. 1 (2008), pp. 125–138.
