= Sit tibi terra levis =

Latin inscription on funerary items

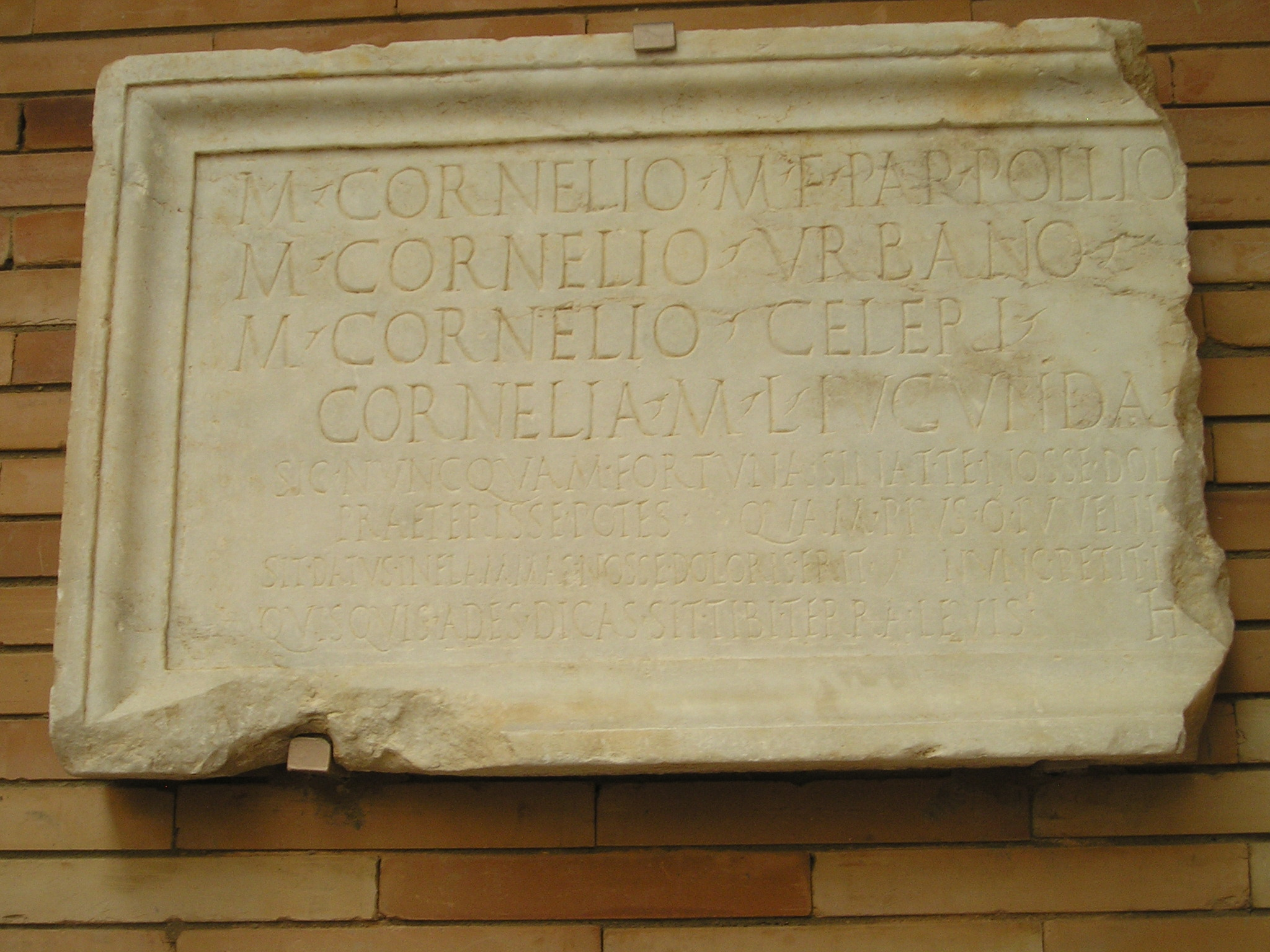
Latin inscription from Mérida, Spain, in the Museo Nacional de Arte Romano (National Museum of Roman Art), reading: M(arco) Cornelio M(arci) f(ilio) Pap(iria) Pollio / M(arco) Cornelio Urbano / M(arco) Cornelio Celeri / Cornelia M(arci) l(iberta) Iucunda / sic nuncquam Fortuna sinat te nosse dolo[rem] / praeterisse potes quasm pius o iuvenis / sit datus in flammas nosse doloris rit nunc petit i[---] / quisquis ades dicas sit tibi terra levis h(ic) [---]

Sit tibi terra levis (commonly abbreviated as S·T·T·L or S.T.T.L. or STTL) is a Latin inscription used on funerary items from ancient Roman times onwards. The English language translation is approximately "May the earth rest lightly on you" or "May the ground be light to you"; the more literal, word by word, translation, is sit "may be", tibi "to you", terra "ground, soil", levis "light" (in the sense of the opposite of "heavy").

The origin of the phrase can be found in Euripides' Alcestis; the phrase in Greek is κούφα σοι χθὼν ἐπάνωθε πέσοι, koupha soi chthon epanothe pesoi. Euripides' phrase "underwent all kinds of variations", (Note: A later satirical example of this in Greek, is the following epigram (cf. Martial's Epigrammata 9.29.11-12) by Ammianus Epigrammaticus (1st and/or 2nd century CE): Εἴη σοι κατὰ γῆς κούφη κόνις, οἰκτρὲ Νέαρχε, ὄφρα σε ῥηϊδίως ἐξερύσωσι κύνες. May the dust lie light on thee when under earth, wretched Nearchus, so that the dogs may easily drag thee out.) especially in Latin poets like Propertius, Ovid, Martial, and Persius; although some minor variants like Sit Ei Terra Levis – abbreviated to SETL – are attested, and excluding Roman Africa which developed its own stock formula (Ossa Tibi Bene Quiescant – OTBQ – or similar), in Latin epitaphs the phrase became formulaic, acquiring the aforementioned abbreviation. On the contrary, in Greek epitaphs, it never became such a fixed formula; it is found in various forms, e.g. γαῖαν ἔχοις ἐλαφράν, κούφη σοι κόνις ἥδε πέλοι, κούφη σεῖο γαῖ' ὀστέα κεύθοι.

The Latin formula was usually located at the end of the inscription; at the beginning, another formulaic phrase was often used: Dis Manibus, i.e. "To the spirits of the dead"; first thus, then shortened to Dis Man and finally to DM. The latter, along with STTL, had replaced in about the mid-first century CE, the older model, common during the first century BCE and first century CE, of ending the inscription with Hic situs est or Hic sita est ("he or she lies here"; abbreviated to HSE), and the name of the dead person. (Note: A very common, through space and time, phrase in Greek and the analogue of the Latin one is Ἐνθάδε κεῖται, Enthade keitai, "Here lies".)

== Notes and references ==
Notes

== See also ==
- RIP
- Memento mori
- Necropolis
- Stele
- Roman funerals and burial
- Ancient Greek funeral and burial practices
