= Arthur Winnington-Ingram =

Bishop of London from 1901 to 1939

The Right Reverend and Right Honourable Arthur Winnington-Ingram KCVO
- Bishop of London
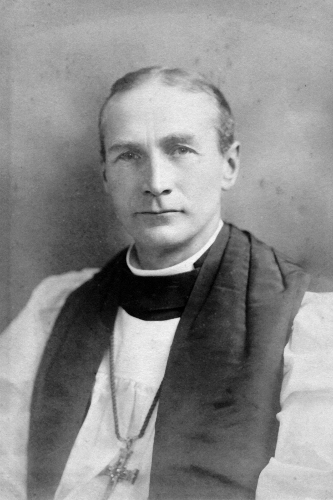
- Winnington-Ingram, c. 1910
- Church: Church of England
- Province: Canterbury
- Diocese: London
- Elected: 17 April 1901 (confirmed)
- Term ended: 1 September 1939 (retired)
- Predecessor: Mandell Creighton
- Successor: Geoffrey Fisher
- Other posts: Bishop of Stepney; 1897–1901

Orders
- Ordination: Geoffrey Fisher
- Consecration: 30 November 1897

Personal details
- Born: 26 January 1858 Stanford-on-Teme, Worcestershire, England
- Died: 26 May 1946 (aged 88) Upton-upon-Severn, Worcestershire, England
- Denomination: Anglican
- Parents: Edward Winnington-Ingram; Louisa Pepys
- Education: Marlborough College
- Alma mater: Keble College, Oxford

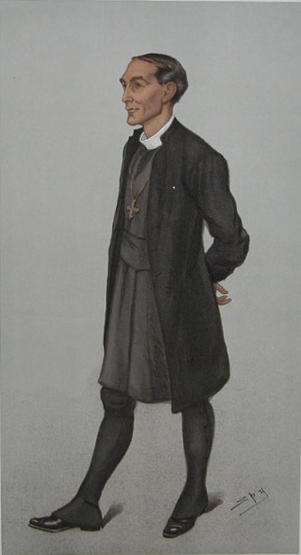
"London" – Winnington-Ingram as caricatured by Spy (Leslie Ward) in Vanity Fair, May 1901

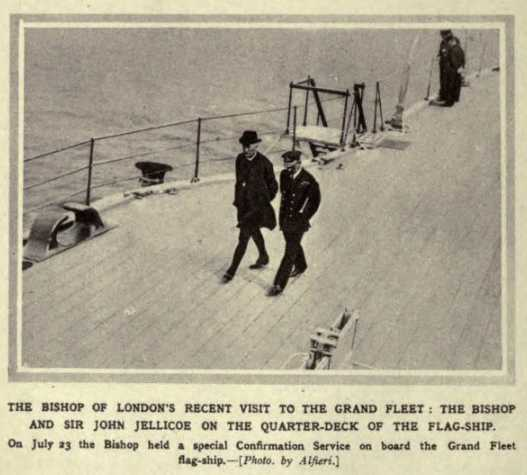
Winnington-Ingram on a visit to the Royal Navy flagship in 1916 (Illustrated War News)

Arthur Foley Winnington-Ingram KCVO PC (26 January 1858 – 26 May 1946) was Bishop of London from 1901 to 1939.

== Early life and career ==
He was born in the rectory at Stanford-on-Teme, Worcestershire, the fourth son of Edward Winnington-Ingram (a Church of England priest and Rector of Stanford) and of Louisa (daughter of Henry Pepys, Bishop of Worcester). Winnington-Ingram was educated at Marlborough College and Keble College, Oxford; he graduated with second-class honours in Literae Humaniores ('Greats') in 1881. His younger brother Edward and his nephew (Edward's son) Arthur were both priests who became Archdeacons of Hereford. Another nephew of his was Reginald Pepys Winnington-Ingram, a scholar of Greek tragedy and Professor of Greek at King's College, London.

He was a private tutor in Europe, 1881–84; curate at St Mary's, Shrewsbury, 1884–85; private chaplain to the Bishop of Lichfield, 1885–89; head of Oxford House Settlement, Bethnal Green 1889–97, chaplain to the Archbishop of York, 1889; rector of St Matthew's, Bethnal Green, 1895; rural dean of Spitalfields, 1896; and canon of St Paul's Cathedral, 1897.

== Episcopal career ==
In 1897, Winnington-Ingram was raised to the episcopate as the second suffragan Bishop of Stepney. In 1901, after the death of Mandell Creighton, he was nominated to the See of London, and he was in the same year appointed as a Privy Counsellor. As a preacher he proved very successful. He was a leader in social work in London's East End. As an administrator he has been judged inefficient in maintaining standards among the clergy in comparison with his disciplinarian-minded successor Geoffrey Fisher, a feature aggravated by his lengthy tenure.

== First World War ==
During the First World War Winnington-Ingram threw himself into supporting the war effort. He saw the war as a "great crusade to defend the weak against the strong" and accepted uncritically stories of German atrocities. For a clergyman the language he used about the German people verged on xenophobia and H. H. Asquith, Prime Minister at the outbreak of the war, described his pitch as "jingoism of the shallowest kind". He spoke in aid of recruiting drives and later in the war urged his younger clergy to consider enlisting as combatants. Chaplain from 1901 to the London Rifle Brigade and London Royal Naval Volunteers, he visited the troops on both the Western Front and at Salonika, and the Grand Fleet at Rosyth and Scapa Flow. A despatch from Field Marshal French portrayed Winnington-Ingram's visit to the Western Front; "The Bishop held several services virtually under shell fire, and it was with difficulty that he could be prevented from carrying on his ministrations under rifle fire in the trenches." Such apparent derring-do and appeals to patriotism strengthened his reputation as a 'people's bishop'.

Winnington-Ingram was renowned as a charismatic preacher and persuasive writer, and he was arguably better known and more influential than either of the archbishops. Examples of his persuasive vocabulary can be traced throughout the War in the monthly London Diocesan Magazine, often quoted in the press: "Now, Jerusalem is a beautiful place, but England is far more beautiful", "We face possibly another year of war, but it is God’s War; it is War for peace; it is a War for all the things which are essential to lasting peace, freedom, respect for national aspirations, international honour and chivalry to the weak", "Great Britain has risen like a tower out of the deep and stands today higher in the opinion of the world than it has since Trafalgar and Waterloo".

For his war work he was Mentioned in Despatches and awarded the Grand Cross of the Order of the Redeemer (Greece) and the Order of St Sava, 1st Class (Serbia).

== Later life and legacy ==
On 22 May 1946, Winnington-Ingram was taken ill while playing golf and he died a few days later on 26 May 1946 in Upton-upon-Severn, Worcestershire. His remains were buried at St Paul's Cathedral. He never married, although while Bishop of Stepney he was briefly engaged to Lady Ulrica Duncombe, a friend of Queen Alexandra and daughter of William Ernest Duncombe, 1st Earl of Feversham of Ryedale and Mabel Violet Graham.

In 1930, he noted the difficulty of finding young men to study for the priesthood, saying there was "a certain amount of social contempt for a boy who intends to become a clergy man.”

Australian sculptor Theodora Cowan created a portrait bust of Dr Winnington-Ingram which "took pride of place" in her one-woman show at London's Grafton Galleries.

He is commemorated in some of the street names in Hampstead Garden Suburb: The Bishops Avenue, Winnington Road and Ingram Avenue; and Bishop Winnington-Ingram Primary School, Ruislip.

A wide public was familiar with Winnington-Ingram through numerous illustrations of various kinds, including cartoons; the National Portrait Gallery catalogues a collection of fifty-three portraits. There is a portrait in Keble College Hall.

== Works ==
Unless otherwise indicated, all titles sourced from his sketch in Crockford's Clerical Directory 1938:

- Old Testament Difficulties (1890)
- New Testament Difficulties (1892)
- Church Difficulties (1893)
- Work in Great Cities (1895)
- Messengers, Watchmen, Stewards (1896)
- The Men Who Crucified Christ (1896)
- Friends of the Master (1897)
- Banners of the Christian Faith (1899)
- Popular Objections to Christianity (1899)
- The Afterglow of a Great Reign (1901)
- Under the Dome (1902)
- Addresses in Holy Week (1902)
- Faith of Church and Nation (1904)
- Lenten Addresses (1905)
- The Gospel in Action (1906)
- A mission of the Spirit (1906)
- The Call of the Father (1907)
- The Love of the Trinity (1908)
- Joy in God (1909)
- Into the Fighting Line (1909)
- The Mysteries of God (1910)
- Secrets of Strength (1911)
- The Attractiveness of Goodness (1913)
- The Gospel of the Miraculous (1913)
- A Day of God (1914)
- The Eyes of Flames (1914)
- The Church in time of war (1915)
- The Potter and the Clay (1917)
- Rays of Dawn (1918)
- Victory and After (1919)
- Spirit of Peace (1921)
- Rebuilding the Walls (1922)
- The Spirit of Jesus (1925)
- The Sword of Goliath (1926)
- Some World Problems (1927)
- Holiday Recollections of a World Tour (1928)
- Why am I a Christian? (1929)
- Good News from God (1930)
- What the Cross Means to Me (1934)
- Has God spoken to man? (1934)
- Has the Kingdom of God Arrived? (1935)
- Nine Christian Virtues (1936)
- Every Man's Problems and Difficulties (1937)
- What a Layman Should Believe (1938)
- The Secrets of Happiness (1939)
- Fifty Years' Work in London (1940)
- Secrets of Fortitude (1940)

Church of England titles
Preceded by George Forrest Browne	Bishop of Stepney; 1897–1901	Succeeded by Cosmo Lang
Preceded by Mandell Creighton	Bishop of London; 1901–1939	Succeeded by Geoffrey Fisher
