= Thomas J. Mathiesen =

American musicologist (born 1947)

- Born: Thomas James Mathiesen; April 30, 1947 (age 79); Roslyn Heights, New York, US
- Known for: Scholarship on the music of Ancient Greece

Academic background
- Education: Willamette University; University of Southern California

Academic work
- Discipline: Ancient music, early music theory
- Institutions: Indiana University Bloomington; Brigham Young University; University of Southern California

Thomas James Mathiesen (born April 30, 1947) is an American musicologist, whose research focuses on Ancient music and the music theory of ancient and early periods. A leading scholar of the music of Ancient Greece, Mathiesen has written four monographs and numerous articles on the topic.

== Life and career ==
Thomas James Mathiesen was born in Roslyn Heights, New York, US on April 30, 1947. He received a Bachelor of Arts at Willamette University in 1968, and both a Master of Music and a PhD at the University of Southern California (USC). At the latter school, Mathiesen's teachers included scholars such as Ingolf Dahl and Halsey Stevens. After a stint teaching at USC from 1971 to 1972, he became a professor at the Brigham Young University. In 1988 he became a professor at Indiana University Bloomington, and in 1996 he was made a distinguished Professor of Music there.

Mathiesen's research centers around Ancient music, in particular, he is a leading scholar of the music of Ancient Greece. This subject is the topic of his four book-length studies, Aristides Quintilianus on Music in Three Books: Translation, with Introduction, Commentary, and Annotations (1983), Ancient Greek Music Theory: A Catalogue raisonné of Manuscripts RISM B/XI (1988), Greek Views of Music (1997) and Apollo's Lyre: Greek Music and Music Theory in Antiquity and the Middle Ages (1999). Other topics he engages in include the history of music theory, particularly of Medieval music and Renaissance music. His scholarship includes the topics of "textual criticism, editorial technique, bibliography and codicology".

Mathiesen established in 1990 the online project Thesaurus Musicarum Latinarum (TML) and led it until 2015. Due to his efforts TML became a world-wide known database of early music treatises, with a free access.

The recipient of numerous awards and grants, Mathiesen has received a Guggenheim Fellowship in 1990, the American Musicological Society's Kinkeldey Award and multiple Deems Taylor Awards from ASCAP, among others.

== Selected bibliography ==
Books

- Mathiesen, Thomas J. (1999). Apollo's Lyre: Greek Music and Music Theory in Antiquity and the Middle Ages. Lincoln: University of Nebraska Press. ISBN 978-0-8032-3079-8.

Articles

- Anderson, Warren (2001). "Limenius". Grove Music Online. Revised by Thomas J. Mathiesen. Oxford: Oxford University Press. doi:10.1093/gmo/9781561592630.article.16664. (subscription, Wikilibrary access, or UK public library membership required)
- Chew, Geoffrey; Mathiesen, Thomas J.; Payne, Thomas B.; Fallows, David (2001). "Song". Grove Music Online. Oxford: Oxford University Press. doi:10.1093/gmo/9781561592630.article.50647. ISBN 978-1-56159-263-0. (subscription, Wikilibrary access, or UK public library membership required)
- Romanou, Katy; Mathiesen, Thomas J.; Lingas, Alexander; Maliaras, Nikos; Chaldaiakis, Achilleus; Plemmenos, John; Bamichas, Pyrros; Kardamis, Kostas; Kontossi, Sofia; Economides, Myrto; Tragaki, Dafni; Tsagkarakis, Ioannis; Chardas, Kostas; Seiragakis, Manolis; Chianis, Sotirios; Brandl, Rudolph M. (2019). "Greece". Grove Music Online. Oxford: Oxford University Press. doi:10.1093/omo/9781561592630.013.3000000167. ISBN 9781561592630. (subscription, Wikilibrary access, or UK public library membership required)
