= Funerary Stela of Demokleides =

Funerary cenotaph

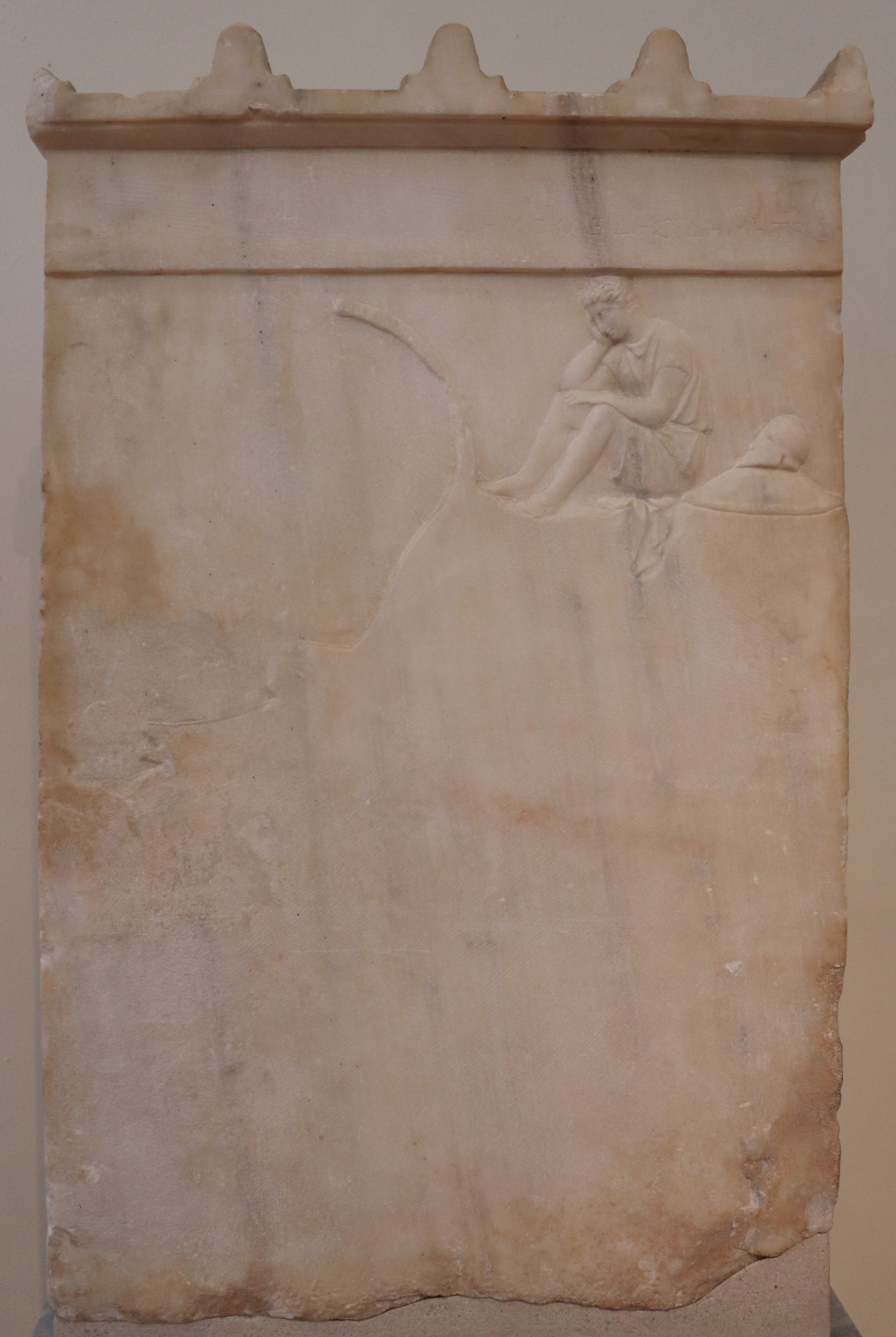
- Material: Marble
- Height: 0.70 m
- Width: 0.45 m
- Period/culture: 400-375 BC
- Discovered: 1881; Piraeus
- Present location: National Archaeological Museum, Athens, Greece
- Identification: Sculpture Collection inv. no 752
- Culture: Classical Athens

The Funerary Stela of Demokleides (NAMA 752) is a funerary monument on display at the National Archaeological Museum, Athens.

Displayed as part of the museum's sculpture collection, the stela is unique amongst many stelai and gravestones contemporary to Classical Athens, for its naval iconography, and its usage of minimalism.

== Description ==
The stela was discovered in 1881 in the port city of Piraeus, and depicts a young hoplite, in chiton sitting on his chlamys, with his shield, weaponry, and Corinthian helmet behind him. The text above the young man denotes him as Demokleides, son of Demetrios.

Demokleides is seen in a pensive position, right arm resting on his knees, overlooking the vast emptiness that is the sea, on the ram of a trireme. The stela was likely once painted blue as well.

The stela was dedicated by his family, mourning the loss of him and his body, presumably lost at sea, killed in action in at the Battle of Nemea in 394 BC, and as a hoplite, the graves are observed to be of higher status, with more attention paid by the families of the deceased.
