= Tralles (Phrygia) =

Tralles (Ancient Greek: Τράλλης) or Tralleis (Τράλλεις) was a town of ancient Phrygia, on the west of Apamea, and 15 miles east of Hierapolis not far from the banks of the Maeander.

William Smith accepts that the ruins near Kuslar are the site of Tralles, but modern scholars leave the town as unlocated.
