= Gela Painter =

Ancient Greek vase painter

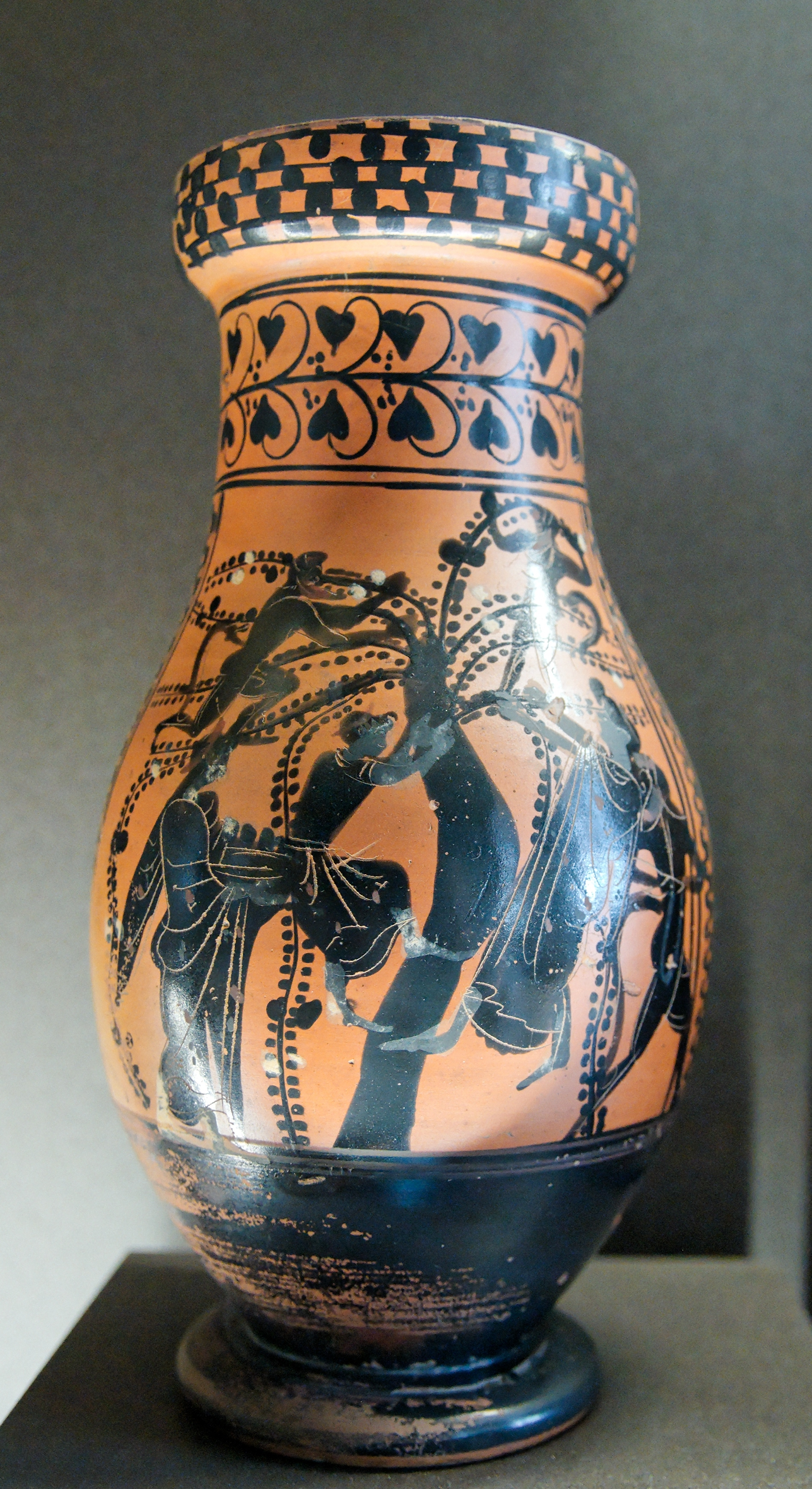
Satyrs and maenads gathering olives, olpe, ca. 500–490 BC. Paris: Louvre.

The Gela Painter was an Attic black-figure vase painter. His real name is unknown. His long career started around the turn of the 6th and 5th centuries BC. A majority of his works, consisting mainly of lekythoi were exported to West Greece. His work was strongly influenced by the newly developed red-figure style. His style is often careless, but his images are original. Especially his mythological and genre scenes are notable. Often, his compositions on smaller vases mirror those normally used on larger, more expensive, ones. On his shoulder ornaments, he replaced the conventional buds with leaves.

== Bibliography ==
- John Beazley: Attic Black-figure Vase-painters. Oxford 1956, p.
- John Boardman: Schwarzfigurige Vasen aus Athen. Ein Handbuch, von Zabern, 4. Edn., Mainz 1994 (Kulturgeschichte der Antiken Welt, Vol 1) ISBN 3-8053-0233-9, p. 126f.
