= R. P. Winnington-Ingram =

British classical scholar (1904–1993)

R. P. Winnington-Ingram FBA
- Portrait by Walter Bird, 1960
- Born: 22 January 1904; Sherborne, Dorset, England
- Died: 3 January 1993 (aged 88); London, England
- Spouse: Mary Cousins (m. 1938; died 1992)

Academic background
- Education: Clifton College; Trinity College, Cambridge

Academic work
- Discipline: Classics
- Institutions: University of Manchester; Birkbeck College, London; Westfield College
- Main interests: Greek tragedy; Ancient Greek music

Reginald Pepys Winnington-Ingram FBA (22 January 1904 – 3 January 1993) was a British classicist, an authority on Greek tragedy and ancient Greek music.

== Life ==
Reginald Pepys Winnington-Ingram was born in Sherborne, Dorset on 22 January 1904, the son of Rear admiral Charles William Winnington-Ingram and his wife Ida Vera Maude (née Chambers). His uncle was Arthur Winnington-Ingram, the Bishop of London from 1901 to 1939.

Winnington-Ingram was educated at Clifton College and studied at Trinity College, Cambridge. Afterwards, he was lecturer at the University of Manchester. From 1934 to 1948 he was Reader in Classics at Birkbeck College, London. Then he was Professor of Classics at Westfield College from 1948 to 1953. From 1953 until his retirement in 1971, he was Professor of Greek Language and Literature at King's College London. He also served as Director of the Institute of Classical Studies at the University of London. He was also President of the Society for the Promotion of Hellenic Studies from 1959 to 1962, and of the London Classical Society. The University of Glasgow conferred an honorary doctorate on him. In his later years he visited the United States several times, taking the post of Visiting Professor at Austin, Texas and teaching at Boston University.

From 1938 until her death in 1992, Winnington-Ingram was married to Mary Cousins. He died on 3 January 1993 in London.

== Research ==
Winnington-Ingram was one of the leading scholars of Greek tragedy and ancient Greek music. He published groundbreaking studies on Euripides' Bacchae, and on the work of Sophocles and Aeschylus. In the field of ancient music, he edited Aristides Quintilianus' On Music. Easterling cites him as writing the entry on Greek Music in the Grove Dictionary of Music.

In 1963, Winnington-Ingram initiated the King's College Greek Play, an annual performance of a Greek drama by the students of King's College London.

== Selected works ==
- Mode in Ancient Greek Music (1936)
- Euripides and Dionysus (1948)
- Aristidis Quintiliani De musica libri tres (Edited, 1963)
- Sophocles. An interpretation (1980)
- Studies in Aeschylus (1983)
