= Tralles (diocese) =

Ancient Hellenic and Roman town in modern-day Turkey

Tralles in Asia
- City
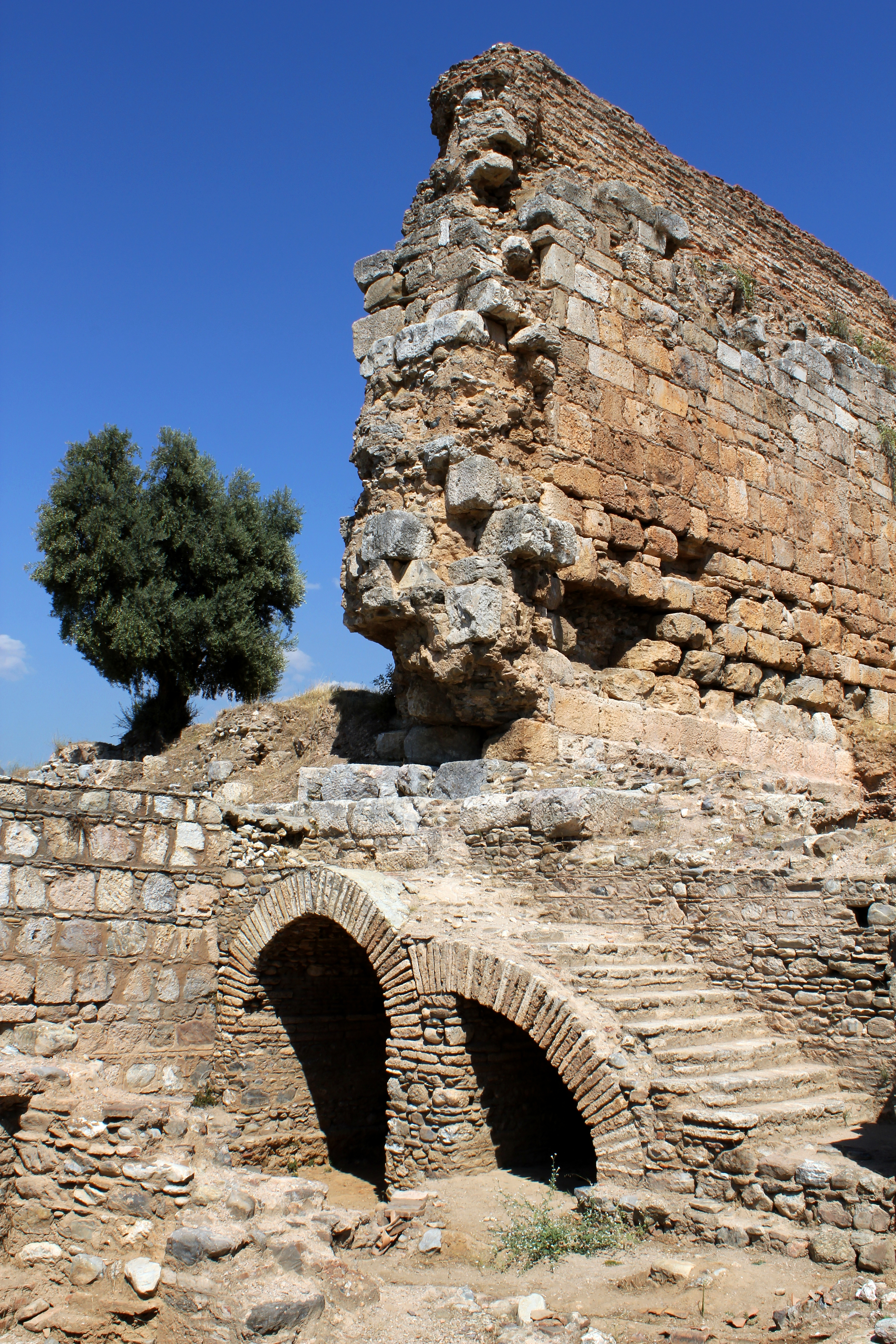
- Ruins at Tralles

- Location within Turkey
- Coordinates: 37°50′53″N 27°50′43″E

Tralles (Ancient Greek:Τράλλεις) was a colonia (town) of the Hellenic, Roman and Byzantine empires, later known as Andronicopolis (Άνδρονικούπολις). Tralles was sacked by the Turks in 1284, but remains today a titular see of the Roman Catholic Church. A new Turkish city, Aydın, was built in its place.

== Bishops ==
An early bishop Polybius (fl. ca. 105) is attested by a letter from Saint Ignatius of Antioch to the church at Tralles. Ignatius wrote an epistle to the church here, and Anthemius of Tralles, the architect of Hagia Sophia in Constantinople, was born in Tralles. The city was officially Christianized, along with the rest of Caria, early after the conversion of Constantine, at which time the see was confirmed. Among the recorded bishops are:

- Heracleon (fl.431),
- Maximus (451),
- Uranius (553),
- Michel
- Myron (692),
- Theophylactus (787),
- Theophanes and Theopistus both 9th century,
- John (1230).

The Catholic Church includes this bishopric in its list of titular sees as Tralles in Asia, distinguishing it from the see of Tralles in Lydia. It has appointed no new titular bishop to these Eastern sees since the Second Vatican Council.

- Zacharie de Metz (22 Feb 1656 Appointed – 13 Jul 1661)
- Matthew Makil (11 Aug 1896 Appointed – 26 Jan 1914)
- Antonio Hernández y Rodríguez (23 Sep 1922 Appointed – 13 Jan 1926)
- Eugène-Charles-Philippe Crépin (9 Apr 1926 Appointed – 1 Apr 1942)
- Emanuele Galea (9 Jun 1942 Appointed – 21 Aug 1974)
