= Incomposite interval =

An incomposite interval (Ancient Greek: διάστημα ἀσύνθετον; German: ungeteilte Intervall, einfache Intervall) is a concept in the Ancient Greek theory of music concerning melodic musical intervals (Ancient Greek: διαστημάτων) between neighbouring notes in a tetrachord or scale which, for that reason, do not encompass smaller intervals. (Ancient Greek: ἀσύνθετος means "uncompounded".) Aristoxenus (fl. 335 BCE) defines melodically incomposite intervals in the following context:

Let us assume that given a systēma, whether pyknon or non-pyknon, no interval less than the remainder of the first concord can be placed next above it, and no interval less than a tone next below it. Let us also assume that each of the notes which are melodically successive in each genus will either form with the fourth note in order from it the concord of a fourth, or will form with the fifth note from it in order the concord of a fifth, or both, and that any note of which none of these things is true is unmelodic relative to those with which it forms no concord. Let us further assume that given that there are four intervals in the fifth, of which two are usually equal (those constituting the pyknon) and two unequal (the remainder of the first concord, and the amount by which the fifth exceeds the fourth), the unequal ones are placed next to the equal ones in the opposite order above and below. Let us assume that notes standing at the same concordant interval from successive notes are in succession with one another. Let us assume that in each genus an interval is melodically incomposite if the voice, in singing a melody, cannot divide it into intervals.

In another place, Aristoxenus clarifies that

the mere discrimination of magnitudes by the senses is no part of a complete understanding of the subject. … For through the magnitudes as such, no knowledge is forthcoming of the functions of either the tetrachords or the notes, or of the distinctions between the genera, or, to put it briefly, of the distinctions between the composite and the incomposite, of the simple and the modulating, of the styles of melodic composition, or, in a word, of anything else at all.

It is thus not an issue of the voice being physically incapable of singing a note within an incomposite interval. For example, in the enharmonic genus the distance from the neighbouring scale degrees lichanos (Ancient Greek: λιχανός) to mesē (Ancient Greek: μέση) is a ditone—a gap equivalent to the major-third interval between F and A in the modern scale. In such a case the function of the note λιχανός is such that "the 'nature of μελῳδία' somehow requires that it should leap forward at least as far as μέση, without touching down anywhere in between. Any smaller distance is melodically impossible or unintelligible, ἐκμελής".

The nature of the chromatic genus, too, is an attribute of the kinēsis phonēs (Ancient Greek: κίνησις φωνῆς, "potentiality of the sounds"), so that certain melody types are "brought into being". In other words, "being composite" and "being incomposite" are attributes of the dynamic character of melodic motion. "None of these consists in the voice's coming to rest at points separated by distances of specific and determinate sizes".

An incomposite interval is "bounded by successive notes" in a scale: "If the bounding notes are successive, no note has been left out; if none has been left out, none will intervene; if none intervenes, none will divide the interval; and what does not admit of division will not be composite". Gaudentius (before the 6th century CE) explains incomposite intervals as scale-building elements:

Intervals are incomposite when between the notes comprising the intervals, not even one note can be sung that is melodic with respect to the notes in the genus in which the incomposite interval is taken. Intervals are composite within which a note or notes are sung. These are also spoken of as scales, for a scale is simply an interval compounded of more than one interval. The incomposite and primary intervals in accord with each genus are the common measures of the rest of the intervals or scales in the same genus.

Aristides Quintilianus (writing probably in the 3rd century AD) enumerates the incomposite intervals: "the smallest, so far as their use in melody is concerned, is the enharmonic diesis, followed—to speak rather roughly—by the semitone, which is twice the diesis, the tone, which is twice the semitone, and finally the ditone, which is twice the tone".

These various sizes of incomposite interval depend on the genus of the tetrachord, as explained by Nicomachus in the first century AD:

Since the first and most elementary concord is the fourth in a continuous tetrachord and in epitritic ratio, it is naturally here that the differences between the three genera of melody are to be found. The diatonic, about which we spoke earlier, proceeds as follows: a semitone, then a tone, then a tone, three intervals between four numbers, that is, four notes. And this is why it is called 'diatonic', because it is the only one of them to proceed through tones [dia tōn tonōn]. The chromatic progresses like this: a semitone, then another semitone, then above them an undivided interval of three semitones, so that it, too, even though it is not straightforwardly composed of two tones and a semitone, nevertheless evidently has intervals equal to two tones and a semitone. It is in the nature of the enharmonic to have the following division: a diesis—that is, half of a semitone—and then another diesis, together equal to a semitone, and then the remainder of the tetrachord, a whole, incomposite ditone.

Thus, whether an interval is composite or incomposite is a matter of context (that is, the genus in effect at that point in the melody). A semitone is an incomposite interval in the diatonic or chromatic genera, but not because quarter tone intervals may be difficult to sing in tune. It is a composite interval in the enharmonic genus, where the semitone occurs only as the outer interval of the pyknon, made of two quarter tones.

Following the strict definition found in Nicola Vicentino's L'antica musica ridotta alla moderna prattica (1555), all intervals larger than the major third (or ditone) are necessarily composite. However, for the purpose of his discussion of the "modern practice" of the 16th century, he extended the definition to include larger intervals within the octave. Accordingly, a perfect fourth is "composite" if it is filled in stepwise in a composition (C-D-E-F), but is "incomposite" when it occurs as a melodic leap or harmonic interval, without any intermediary tones.

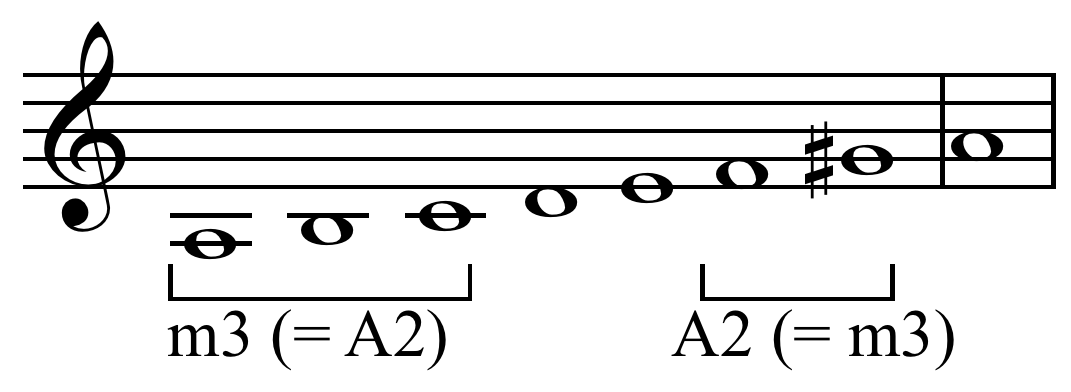
A harmonic minor scale.

One 20th-century interpretation is more restrictive than the definitions found in Ancient Greek sources, referring to "a large interval which appears as a melodic step or second in a scale, but which is a skip in other parts of the scale." For example the augmented second in the harmonic minor scale, on A, occurs as a step between F and G♯, though the equivalent minor third occurs elsewhere, such as a skip between A & C.

== See also ==
- Octave species
