= Phrygian mode =

Authentic Gregorian mode

The Phrygian mode (pronounced /ˈfrɪdʒiən/) can refer to three different musical modes: the ancient Greek tonos or harmonia, sometimes called Phrygian, formed on a particular set of octave species or scales; the medieval Phrygian mode, and the modern conception of the Phrygian mode as a diatonic scale, based on the latter. In Hindustani Classical Music, it is equivalent to the Bhairavi thaat.

== Ancient Greek Phrygian ==
The octave species (scale) underlying the ancient-Greek Phrygian tonos (in its diatonic genus) corresponds to the medieval and modern Dorian mode. The terminology is based on the Elements by Aristoxenos (fl. c. 335 BCE), a disciple of Aristotle. The Phrygian tonos or harmonia is named after the ancient kingdom of Phrygia in Anatolia.

In Greek music theory, the harmonia given this name was based on a tonos, in turn based on a scale or octave species built from a tetrachord which, in its diatonic genus, consisted of a series of rising intervals of a whole tone, followed by a semitone, followed by a whole tone.

In the chromatic genus, this is a minor third followed by two semitones.

In the enharmonic genus, it is a major third and two quarter tones.

A diatonic-genus octave species built upon D is roughly equivalent to playing all the white notes on a piano keyboard from D to D:

This scale, combined with a set of characteristic melodic behaviours and associated ethe, constituted the harmonia which was given the ethnic name "Phrygian", after the "unbounded, ecstatic peoples of the wild, mountainous regions of the Anatolian highlands". This ethnic name was also confusingly applied by theorists such as Cleonides to one of thirteen chromatic transposition levels, regardless of the intervallic makeup of the scale.

Since the Renaissance, music theorists have called this same sequence (on a diatonic scale) the "Dorian" mode, due to a mistake interpreting Greek (it is different from the Greek mode called "Dorian").

== Medieval Phrygian mode ==
The early Catholic Church developed a system of eight musical modes that medieval music scholars gave names drawn from the ones used to describe the ancient Greek harmoniai. The name "Phrygian" was applied to the third of these eight church modes, the authentic mode on E, described as the diatonic octave extending from E to the E an octave higher and divided at B, therefore beginning with a semitone-tone-tone-tone pentachord, followed by a semitone-tone-tone tetrachord:

The ambitus of this mode extended one tone lower, to D. The sixth degree, C, which is the tenor of the corresponding third psalm tone, was regarded by most theorists as the most important note after the final, though the fifteenth-century theorist Johannes Tinctoris implied that the fourth degree, A, could be so regarded instead.

Placing the two tetrachords together produces the Hypophrygian mode (below Phrygian):

== Modern Phrygian mode ==
In modern western music (from the 18th century onward), the Phrygian mode is related to the modern natural minor scale, also known as the Aeolian mode, but with the second scale degree lowered by a semitone, making it a minor second above the tonic, rather than a major second.

The following is the Phrygian mode starting on E, or E Phrygian, with corresponding tonal scale degrees illustrating how the modern major mode and natural minor mode can be altered to produce the Phrygian mode:

E Phrygian
Mode:	E	F	G	A	B	C	D	E
Major:	1	♭2	♭3	4	5	♭6	♭7	1
Minor:	1	♭2	3	4	5	6	7	1

Therefore, the Phrygian mode consists of: root, minor second, minor third, perfect fourth, perfect fifth, minor sixth, minor seventh, and octave. Alternatively, it can be written as the pattern

half, whole, whole, whole, half, whole, whole

In contemporary jazz, the Phrygian mode is used over chords and sonorities built on the mode, such as the sus4(♭9) chord (see Suspended chord), which is sometimes called a Phrygian suspended chord. For example, a soloist might play an E Phrygian over an Esus4(♭9) chord (E–A–B–D–F).

=== Phrygian dominant scale ===
A Phrygian dominant scale is produced by raising the third scale degree of the mode:

E Phrygian dominant
Mode:	E	F	G♯	A	B	C	D	E
Major:	1	♭2	3	4	5	♭6	♭7	1
Minor:	1	♭2	♯3	4	5	6	7	1

The Phrygian dominant is also known as the Spanish gypsy scale, because it resembles the scales found in flamenco and also the Berber rhythms; it is the fifth mode of the harmonic minor scale. Flamenco music uses the Phrygian scale together with a modified scale from the Arab maqām Ḥijāzī (like the Phrygian dominant but with a major sixth scale degree), and a bimodal configuration using both major and minor second and third scale degrees.

== Examples ==
Use of the Phrygian mode on A in Respighi's Trittico Botticelliano (Botticelli Triptych, 1927)

=== Ancient Greek ===
- The First Delphic Hymn, written in 128 BCE by the Athenian composer Limenius, is in the Phrygian and Hyperphrygian tonoi, with much variation.
- The Seikilos epitaph (1st century AD) is in the Phrygian species (diatonic genus), in the Iastian (or low Phrygian) transposition.

=== Medieval and Renaissance ===
- Gregorian chant, Tristes erant apostoli, version in the Vesperale Romanum, originally Ambrosian chant.
- The Roman chant variant of the Requiem introit "Rogamus te" is in the (authentic) Phrygian mode, or 3rd tone.
- Thomas Tallis's Why fum'th in sight, used by Vaughan Williams in his famous fantasia.
- Orlando di Lasso's (d. 1594) motet In me transierunt.
- Giovanni Pierluigi da Palestrina's (d. 1594) motet Congratulamini mihi.
- Josquin's Miserere

=== Baroque ===
- Johann Sebastian Bach keeps in his cantatas the Phrygian mode of some original chorale melodies, such as Luther's "Es woll uns Gott genädig sein" on a melody by Matthias Greitter, used twice in Die Himmel erzählen die Ehre Gottes, BWV 76 (1723)
- Heinrich Schütz's Johannes-Passion (1666) is in the Phrygian mode
- Dieterich Buxtehude's (d. 1707) Prelude in A minor, BuxWV 152, (labeled Phrygisch in the BuxWV catalog)

=== Romantic ===
- Johannes Brahms:
  - Symphony No. 4, second movement.
- Anton Bruckner:
  - Ave Regina caelorum, WAB 8 (1885–88).
  - Pange lingua, WAB 33 (second setting, 1868).
  - Symphony no. 3, passages in the third (scherzo) and fourth movements .
  - Symphony no. 4 (third version, 1880), Finale.
  - Symphony no. 6, first, third (scherzo), and fourth movements.
  - Symphony no. 7, first movement.
  - Symphony no. 8, first and fourth movements.
  - Tota pulchra es, WAB 46 (1878).
  - Vexilla regis, WAB 51 (1892).
- Isaac Albéniz' Rumores de la Caleta, Op. 71, No. 6
- Ralph Vaughan Williams' Fantasia on a Theme by Thomas Tallis, based on Thomas Tallis's 1567 setting of Psalm 2, "Why fum'th in sight".

=== Contemporary classical music ===
- John Coolidge Adams, Phrygian Gates
- Samuel Barber:
  - Adagio for Strings, op. 11
  - "I Hear an Army", from Three Songs, op. 10
- Benjamin Britten, Hymn to St Cecilia
- Philip Glass, the final aria from Satyagraha
- Julian Cochran, Prelude No. 14 uses the Phrygian scale throughout the work.

=== Film music ===
- Howard Shore, "Prologue" accompanying the opening sequence of the film, though the second half of the melody contains an A natural, which in the key of the piece makes it Phrygian Dominant. The Lord of the Rings: The Fellowship of the Ring.

=== Jazz ===
- "Solea" by Gil Evans from Sketches of Spain (1960).
- "Infant Eyes" by Wayne Shorter from Speak No Evil (1966)
- "After the Rain" by John Coltrane from Impressions (1963)

=== Rock and Metal ===
In practical terms it should be said that few rock songs that use modes such as the phrygian, Lydian, or locrian actually maintain a harmony rigorously fixed on them. What usually happens is that the scale is harmonized in [chords with perfect] fifths and the riffs are then played [over] those [chords].

- "Symphony of Destruction" by Megadeth
- "Remember Tomorrow" by Iron Maiden
- "Wherever I May Roam" by Metallica
- "War" by Joe Satriani
- "Sails of Charon" by Scorpions

=== Other popular music ===
- "New Person, Same Old Mistakes" by Tame Impala
- "I Care" by Beyoncé
- "Doo Wop (That Thing)" by Lauryn Hill

== See also ==
- Bhairavi, the equivalent scale (thaat) in Hindustani music
- Shoor, the main scale (dastgah) in Iranian music
- Hanumatodi, the equivalent scale (melakarta) in Carnatic music
- Kürdî, the equivalent scale (makam) in Turkish makam music
- Neapolitan chord
- Phrygian cadence
