= Octave species =

Classification of musical key or scale in ancient Greek music theory

In the musical system of ancient Greece, an octave species (Greek: εἶδος τοῦ διὰ πασῶν, or σχῆμα τοῦ διὰ πασῶν) is a specific sequence of intervals within an octave. In Elementa harmonica, Aristoxenus classifies the species as three different genera, distinguished from each other by the largest intervals in each sequence: the diatonic, chromatic, and enharmonic genera, whose largest intervals are, respectively, a whole tone, a minor third, and a ditone; quarter tones and semitones complete the tetrachords.

The concept of octave species is very close to tonoi and akin to musical scale and mode, and was invoked in Medieval and Renaissance theory of Gregorian mode and Byzantine Octoechos.

== Ancient Greek theory ==
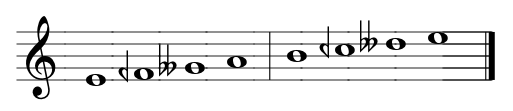
Greek Dorian octave species in the enharmonic genus, showing the two component tetrachords

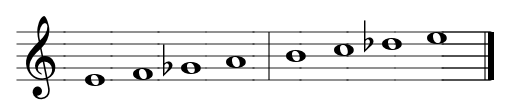
Greek Dorian octave species in the chromatic genus

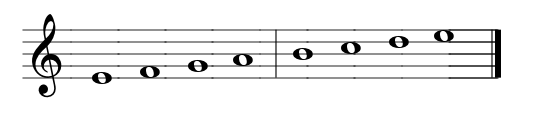
Greek Dorian octave species in the diatonic genus

Greek theorists used two terms interchangeably to describe what we call species: eidos (εἶδος) and skhēma (σχῆμα), defined as "a change in the arrangement of incomposite [intervals] making up a compound magnitude while the number and size of the intervals remains the same". Cleonides, working in the Aristoxenian tradition, describes three species of diatessaron, four of diapente, and seven of diapason in the diatonic genus. Ptolemy in his Harmonics calls them all generally "species of primary consonances" (εἴδη τῶν πρώτων συμφωνιῶν). In the Latin West, Boethius, in his Fundamentals of Music, calls them "species primarum consonantiarum". Boethius and Martianus, in his De Nuptiis Philologiae et Mercurii, further expanded on Greek sources and introduced their own modifications to Greek theories.

=== Octave species ===
The most important of all the consonant species was the octave species, because "from the species of the consonance of the diapason arise what are called modes". The basis of the octave species was the smaller category of species of the perfect fourth, or diatessaron; when filled in with two intermediary notes, the resulting four notes and three consecutive intervals constitute a "tetrachord". The species defined by the different positioning of the intervals within the tetrachord in turn depend upon genus first being established. Incomposite in this context refers to intervals not composed of smaller intervals.

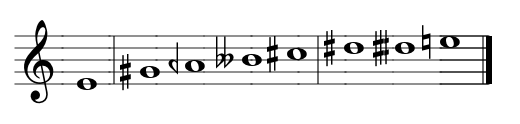
Greek Phrygian octave species in the enharmonic genus

Most Greek theorists distinguish three genera of the tetrachord: enharmonic, chromatic, and diatonic. The enharmonic and chromatic genera are defined by the size of their largest incomposite interval (major third and minor third, respectively), which leaves a composite interval of two smaller parts, together referred to as a pyknon; in the diatonic genus, no single interval is larger than the other two combined. The earliest theorists to attempt a systematic treatment of octave species, the harmonicists (or school of Eratocles) of the late fifth century BC, confined their attention to the enharmonic genus, with the intervals in the resulting seven octave species being:

Mixolydian	¼	¼	2	¼	¼	2	1
Lydian	¼	2	¼	¼	2	1	¼
Phrygian	2	¼	¼	2	1	¼	¼
Dorian	¼	¼	2	1	¼	¼	2
Hypolydian	¼	2	1	¼	¼	2	¼
Hypophrygian	2	1	¼	¼	2	¼	¼
Hypodorian	1	¼	¼	2	¼	¼	2

Species of the perfect fifth (diapente) are then created by the addition of a whole tone to the intervals of the tetrachord. The first, or original species in both cases has the pyknon or, in the diatonic genus, the semitone, at the bottom and, similarly, the lower interval of the pyknon must be smaller or equal to the higher one. The whole tone added to create the species of fifth (the "tone of disjunction") is at the top in the first species; the remaining two species of fourth and three species of fifth are regular rotations of the constituent intervals, in which the lowest interval of each species becomes the highest of the next.( Because of these constraints, tetrachords containing three different incomposite intervals (compared with those in which two of the intervals are of the same size, such as two whole tones) still have only three species, rather than the six possible permutations of the three elements. Similar considerations apply to the species of fifth.

The species of fourth and fifth are then combined into larger constructions called "systems". The older, central "characteristic octave", is made up of two first-species tetrachords separated by a tone of disjunction, and is called the Lesser Perfect System. It therefore includes a lower, first-species fifth and an upper, fourth-species fifth. To this central octave are added two flanking conjuct tetrachords (that is, they share the lower and upper tones of the central octave). This constitutes the Greater Perfect System, with six fixed bounding tones of the four tetrachords, within each of which are two movable pitches. Ptolemy labels the resulting fourteen pitches with the (Greek) letters from Α (Alpha α) to Ο (Omega Ω). (A diagram is shown at systema ametabolon)

The Lesser and Greater Perfect Systems exercise constraints on the possible octave species. Some early theorists, such as Gaudentius in his Harmonic Introduction, recognized that, if the various available intervals could be combined in any order, even restricting species to just the diatonic genus would result in twelve ways of dividing the octave (and his 17th-century editor, Marcus Meibom, pointed out that the actual number is 21), but "only seven species or forms are melodic and symphonic". Those octave species that cannot be mapped onto the system are therefore rejected.

== Medieval theory ==
In chant theory beginning in the 9th century, the New Exposition of the composite treatise called Alia musica developed an eightfold modal system from the seven diatonic octave species of ancient Greek theory, transmitted to the West through the Latin writings of Martianus Capella, Cassiodorus, Isidore of Seville, and, most importantly, Boethius. Together with the species of fourth and fifth, the octave species remained in use as a basis of the theory of modes, in combination with other elements, particularly the system of octoechos borrowed from the Eastern Orthodox Church.

Species theory in general (not just the octave species) remained an important theoretical concept throughout Middle Ages. The following appreciation of species as a structural basis of a mode, found in the Lucidarium (XI, 3) of Marchetto (ca. 1317), can be seen as typical:

We declare that those who judge the mode of a melody exclusively with regard to ascent and descent cannot be called musicians, but rather blind men, singers of mistake... for, as Bernard said, "species are dishes at a musical banquet; they create modes."
