= Diatonic and chromatic =

Terms in music theory to characterize scales

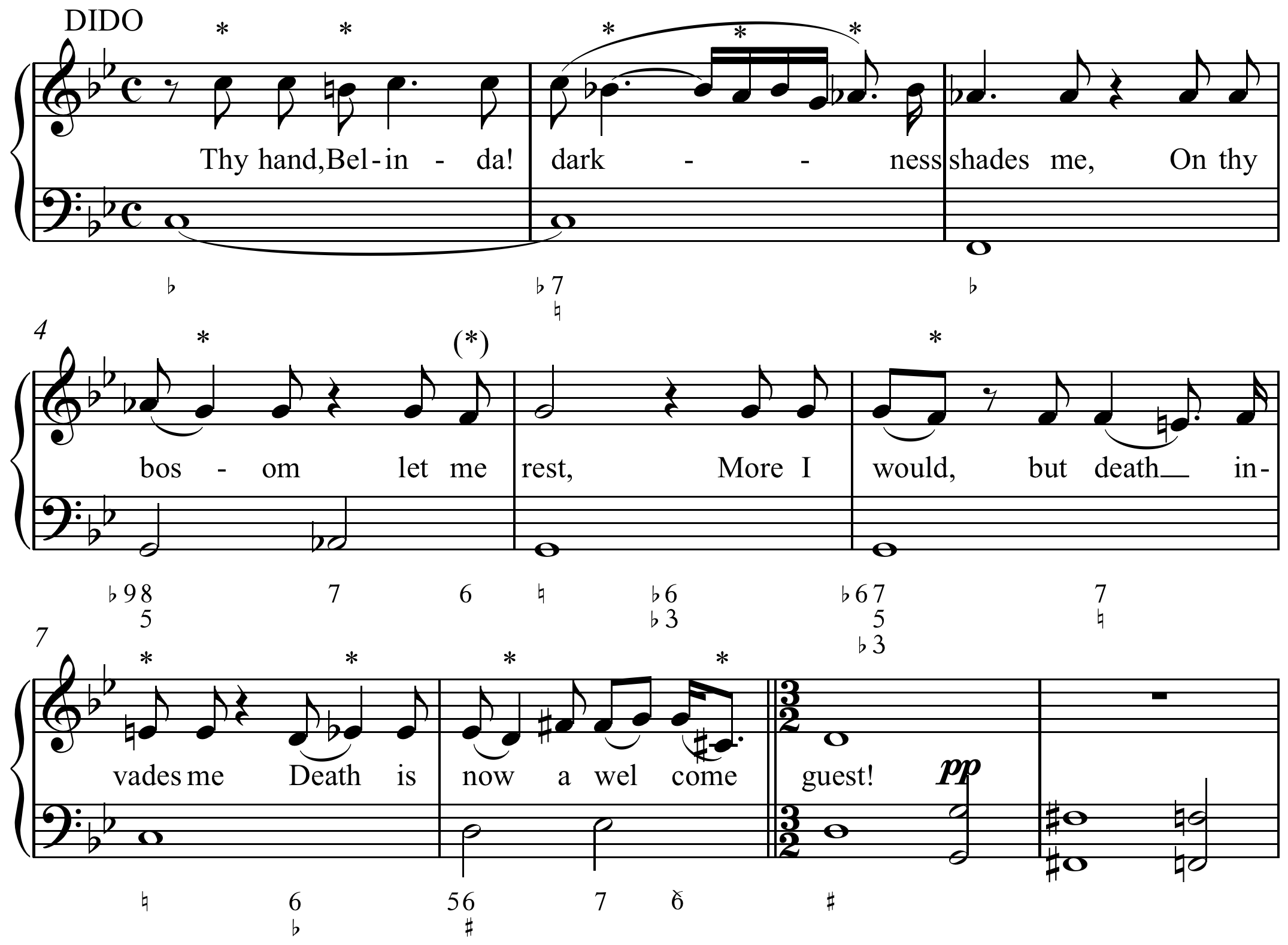
Melodies can be based on a diatonic scale and maintain its tonal characteristics but contain multiple accidentals, up to all twelve tones of the chromatic scale, such as the opening of Henry Purcell's "Thy Hand, Belinda" from Dido and Aeneas (1689) with figured bass), which features eleven of twelve pitches while chromatically descending by half steps, the missing pitch being sung later. Melody With figured bass

Béla Bartók: Music for Strings, Percussion and Celesta, movement I, fugue subject: chromatic.

Bartók: Music ..., movement I, fugue subject: diatonic variant

Diatonic and chromatic are terms in music theory that are used to characterize scales. The terms are also applied to musical instruments, intervals, chords, notes, musical styles, and kinds of harmony. They are very often used as a pair, especially when applied to contrasting features of the common practice music of the period 1600–1900. (Note: Often diatonic and chromatic are treated as mutually exclusive opposites, concerning common practice music. This article deals mainly with common practice music, and later music that shares the same core features (including the same particular use of tonality, harmonic and melodic idioms, and types of scales, chords, and intervals). Where other music is dealt with, this is specially noted.)

These terms may mean different things in different contexts. Very often, diatonic refers to musical elements derived from the modes and transpositions of the "white note scale" C–D–E–F–G–A–B. (Note: This definition encompasses the natural minor scale (and equivalently the descending melodic minor), the major scale, and the ecclesiastical modes.) In some usages it includes all forms of heptatonic scale that are in common use in Western music (the major, and all forms of the minor). (Note: For inclusion of the harmonic minor and the ascending melodic minor see the section Modern meanings of "diatonic scale" in this article.)

Chromatic most often refers to structures derived from the chromatic scale in 12-tone equal temperament, which consists of all semitones. Historically, however, it had other senses, referring in Ancient Greek music theory to a particular tuning of the tetrachord, and to a rhythmic notational convention in mensural music of the 14th to 16th centuries.

== History ==
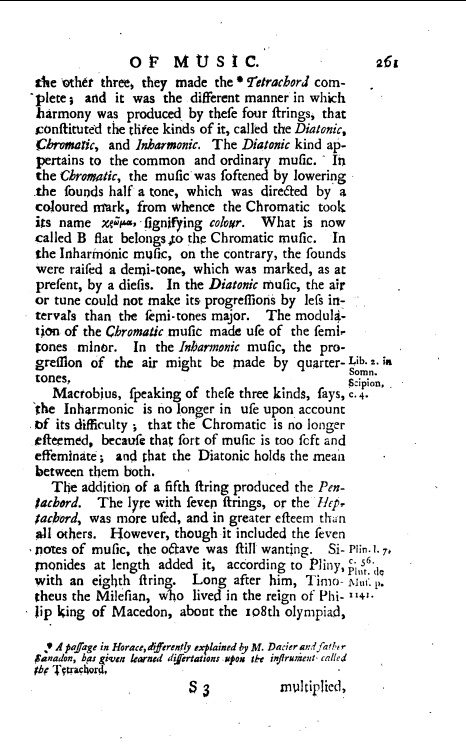
Tetrachord genera of the four-string lyre, from The History of the Arts and Sciences of the Antients, Charles Rollin (1768). The text gives a typically fanciful account of the term chromatic.

=== Greek genera ===
In ancient Greece there were three standard tunings (known by the Latin word genus, plural genera) (Note: Translating the term used by Greek theorists: γένος, génos; plural γένη, génē.) of a lyre. These three tunings were called diatonic, (Note: The English word diatonic is ultimately from the Greek διατονικός (diatonikós), itself from διάτονος (diátonos), of disputed etymology. Most plausibly, it refers to the intervals being "stretched out" in that tuning, in contrast to the other two tunings, whose lower two intervals were referred to as πυκνόν (pyknón), from πυκνός (pyknós, "dense, compressed"). For more information, especially concerning the various exact tunings of the diatonic tetrachord, see Diatonic genus.) chromatic, (Note: Chromatic is from Greek χρωματικός (khrōmatikós), itself from χρῶμα (khrṓma), which means complexion, hence colour – or, specifically as a musical term, "a modification of the simplest music" (Liddell and Scott's Greek lexicon). For more information, especially concerning the various exact tunings of the chromatic tetrachord, see Chromatic genus.) and enharmonic, and the sequences of four notes that they produced were called tetrachords ("four strings"). (Note: In practice tetrachord (τετράχορδον; tetrákhordon) also meant the instrument itself. And it could also mean the interval of a perfect fourth between the pitches of the fixed top and bottom strings; therefore the various tunings were called divisions of the tetrachord (see OED, "Tetrachord".) A diatonic tetrachord comprised, in descending order, two whole tones and a semitone, such as A G F E (roughly). In the chromatic tetrachord the second string of the lyre was lowered from G to G♭, so that the two lower intervals in the tetrachord were semitones, making the pitches A G♭ F E. In the enharmonic tetrachord the second string of the lyre was lowered further to G, so that the two lower interval in the tetrachord were quarter tones, making the pitches A G F E (where F is F♮ lowered by a quarter tone). For all three tetrachords, only the middle two strings varied in their pitch. (Note: For general and introductory coverage of Greek theory see Tuning and Temperament, A Historical Survey, Barbour, J. Murray, 2004 (reprint of 1972 edition), ISBN 0-486-43406-0.) (Note: These meanings in Greek theory are the ultimate source of the meanings of the words today, but through a great deal of modification and confusion in Medieval times. It would therefore be a mistake to consider the Greek system and the subsequent Western systems (Medieval, Renaissance, or contemporary) as closely similar simply because of the use of similar terms: "... the categories of the diatonic, chromatic and enharmonic genera developed within the framework of monodic musical culture and have little in common with the corresponding categories of modern music theory." There were several Greek systems, in any case. What is presented here is merely a simplification of theory that spans several centuries, from the time of Pythagoras (c. 580 BCE – c. 500 BCE), through Aristoxenus (c. 362 BCE – after 320 BCE), to such late theorists as Alypius of Alexandria (fl. 360 CE). Specifically, there are more versions of each of the three tetrachords than are described here.)

=== Medieval coloration ===
The term cromatico (Italian) was occasionally used in the medieval and Renaissance periods to refer to the coloration (Latin coloratio) of certain notes. The details vary widely by period and place, but generally the addition of a colour (often red) to an empty or filled head of a note, or the "colouring in" of an otherwise empty head of a note, shortens the duration of the note. (Note: Details of the practice for certain periods: "The device that was both the simplest and the most stable and durable was that known as coloratio. In principle, any note or group of notes subjected to coloration or blackening was reduced to two-thirds of the value that it would have enjoyed in its pristine state. In respect of any note in mensural notation that was equal in duration to two of that next smaller in value, the coloration of three in succession caused each to undergo reduction to two-thirds of its erstwhile value, so creating a triplet ... In the case of any note that was equal in duration to three of that next smaller, the coloration of three together likewise effected a proportional reduction in the value of each to two-thirds, so reducing perfect value to imperfect and commonly creating the effect called hemiola ... On occasions coloured notes could appear singly to denote imperfect value, especially to inhibit unwanted perfection and alteration.") In works of the Ars Nova from the 14th century, this was used to indicate a temporary change in metre from triple to duple, or vice versa. This usage became less common in the 15th century as open white noteheads became the standard notational form for minims (half-notes) and longer notes called white mensural notation. Similarly, in the 16th century, a form of notating secular music, especially madrigals in was referred to as "chromatic" because of its abundance of "coloured in" black notes, that is semiminims (crotchets or quarter notes) and shorter notes, as opposed to the open white notes in, commonly used for the notation of sacred music. These uses for the word have no relationship to the modern meaning of chromatic, but the sense survives in the current term coloratura.

=== Renaissance chromaticism ===
The term chromatic began to approach its modern usage in the 16th century. For instance Orlando Lasso's Prophetiae Sibyllarum opens with a prologue proclaiming, "these chromatic songs, heard in modulation, are those in which the mysteries of the Sibyls are sung, intrepidly," which here takes its modern meaning referring to the frequent change of key and use of chromatic intervals in the work. (The Prophetiae belonged to an experimental musical movement of the time, called musica reservata). This usage comes from a renewed interest in the Greek genera, especially its chromatic tetrachord, notably by the influential theorist Nicola Vicentino in his treatise on ancient and modern practice, 1555.

== Diatonic scales ==
Diatonic scale on C equal tempered and just.

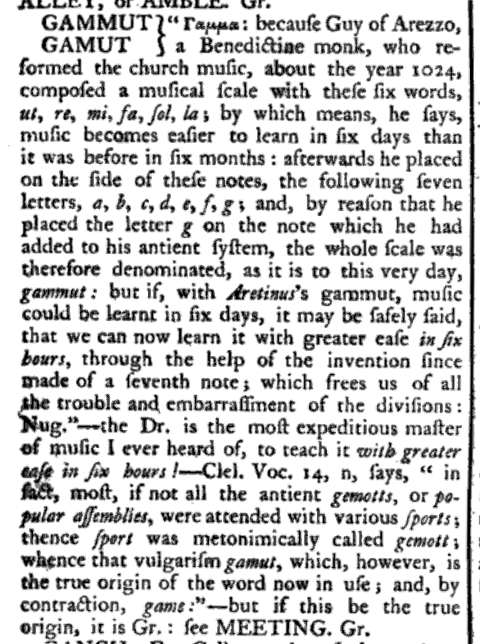
Gamut as defined by George William Lemon, English Etymology, 1783.

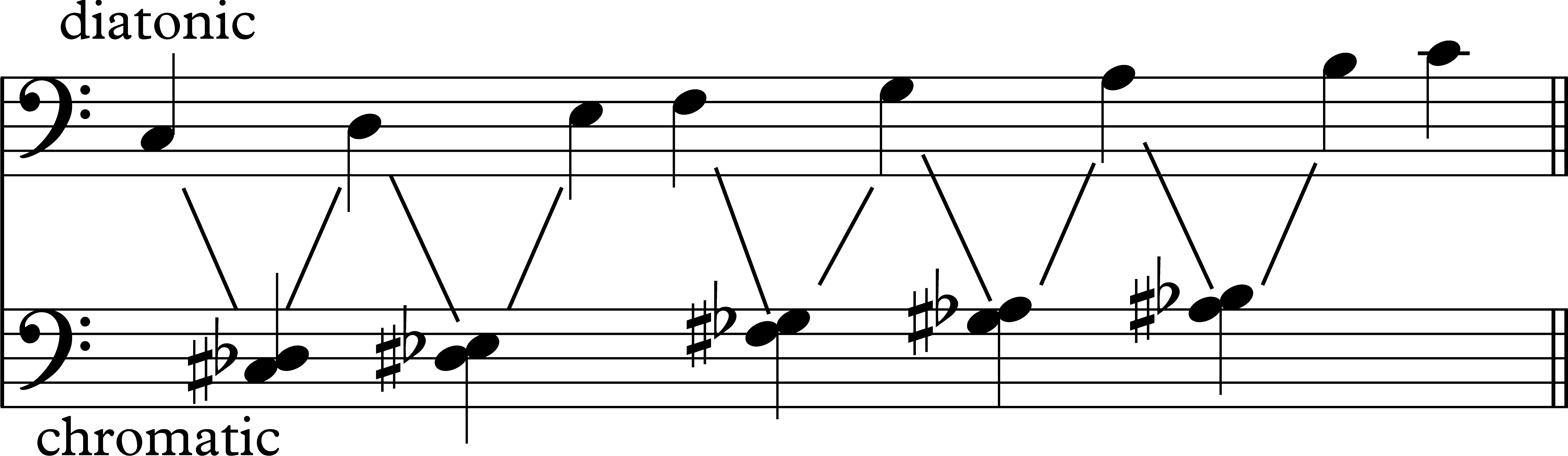
The diatonic scale notes (above) and the non-scale chromatic notes (below)

Medieval theorists defined scales in terms of the Greek tetrachords. The gamut was the series of pitches from which all the Medieval "scales" (or modes, strictly) notionally derive, and it may be thought of as constructed in a certain way from diatonic tetrachords. The origin of the word gamut is explained in the article Guidonian hand; here the word is used in one of the available senses: the all-encompassing gamut as described by Guido d'Arezzo (which includes all of the modes).

The intervals from one note to the next in this medieval gamut are all tones or semitones, recurring in a certain pattern with five tones (T) and two semitones (S) in any given octave. The semitones are separated as much as they can be, between alternating groups of three tones and two tones. Here are the intervals for a string of ascending notes (starting with F) from the gamut:

... –T–T–T–S–T–T–S–T–T–T–S–T– ...

And here are the intervals for an ascending octave (the seven intervals separating the eight notes A–B–C–D–E–F–G–A) from the gamut:

T–S–T–T–S–T–T (five tones and two semitones) (Note: Some theorists derive such a scale from a certain series of pitches rising by six perfect fifths: F–C–G–D–A–E–B. These pitches are then rearranged by transposition to a single-octave scale: C–D–E–F–G–A–B[–C] (the standard C major scale, with the interval structure T–T–S–T–T–T[–S]). A few theorists call the original untransposed series itself a "scale". Percy Goetschius calls that series the "natural scale"; see further citation below).)

The white keys are the modern analog of the gamut. In its most strict definition, therefore, a diatonic scale is one that may be derived from the pitches represented in successive white keys of the piano (or a transposition thereof). This would include the major scale, and the natural minor scale (same as the descending form of the melodic minor), but not the old ecclesiastical church modes, most of which included both versions of the "variable" note B♮/B♭.

=== Modern meanings ===
There are specific applications in the music of the Common Practice Period, and later music that shares its core features.

Most, but not all writers, accept the natural minor as diatonic. As for other forms of the minor: (Note: The first "exclusive" usage seems to be gaining greater currency. Certainly it is becoming close to standard in academic writing, as can be seen by querying online archives (such as JSTOR) for recent uses of the term diatonic. Equally certainly, the second "inclusive" meaning is still strongly represented in non-academic writing (as can be seen by online searches of practically oriented music texts at, for example, Amazon.com). Overall, considerable confusion remains; on the evidence presented in the list of sources, there are very many sources in the third category: Diatonic used vaguely, inconsistently, or anomalously.)

- "Exclusive" usage

Some writers consistently classify the other variants of the minor scale – the melodic minor (ascending form) and the harmonic minor – as non-diatonic, since they are not transpositions of the white-note pitches of the piano. Among such theorists there is no agreed general term that encompasses the major and all forms of the minor scale. (Note: A very clear statement of the "exclusive" stance is given in the excerpt from "The leading tone in direct chromaticism: from Renaissance to Baroque", Clough, John, 1957, below. The excerpt acknowledges and analyses the difficulties with logic, naming, and taxonomy in that stance.)

- "Inclusive" usage

Some writers consistently include the melodic and harmonic minor scales as diatonic also. For this group, every scale standardly used in common practice music and much similar later music is either diatonic (the major, and all forms (Note: A few exclude only the harmonic minor as diatonic, and accept the ascending melodic, because it comprises only tones and semitones, or because it has all of its parts analysable as tetrachords in some way or other.) of the minor) or chromatic. (Note: However, beyond analysis of common practice music, even these writers do not typically consider non-standard uses of some familiar scales to be diatonic. For example, unusual modes of the melodic or harmonic minor scale, such as used in early works by Stravinsky, are almost never described as "diatonic".)

- "Mixed" usage

Still other writers mix these two meanings of diatonic (and conversely for chromatic), and this can lead to confusions and misconceptions. Sometimes context makes the intended meaning clear.

Some other meanings of the term diatonic scale take the extension to harmonic and melodic minor even further, to be even more inclusive.

In general, diatonic is most often used inclusively with respect to music that restricts itself to standard uses of traditional major and minor scales. When discussing music that uses a larger variety of scales and modes (including much jazz, rock, and some tonal 20th-century concert music), writers often adopt the exclusive use to prevent confusion.

== Chromatic scale ==
Chromatic scale on C: full octave ascending and descending

A chromatic scale consists of an ascending or descending sequence of pitches, always proceeding by semitones. Such a sequence of pitches is produced, for example, by playing all the black and white keys of a piano in order. The structure of a chromatic scale is therefore uniform throughout—unlike major and minor scales, which have tones and semitones in particular arrangements (and an augmented second, in the harmonic minor).

== Musical instruments ==
Some instruments, such as the violin, can play any scale; others, such as the glockenspiel, are restricted to the scale to which they are tuned. Among this latter class, some instruments, such as the piano, are always tuned to a chromatic scale, and can be played in any key, while others are restricted to a diatonic scale, and therefore to a particular key. Some instruments, such as the harmonica, harp, and glockenspiel, are available in both diatonic and chromatic versions (although it is possible to play chromatic notes on a diatonic harmonica, they require extended embouchure techniques, and some chromatic notes are only usable by advanced players).

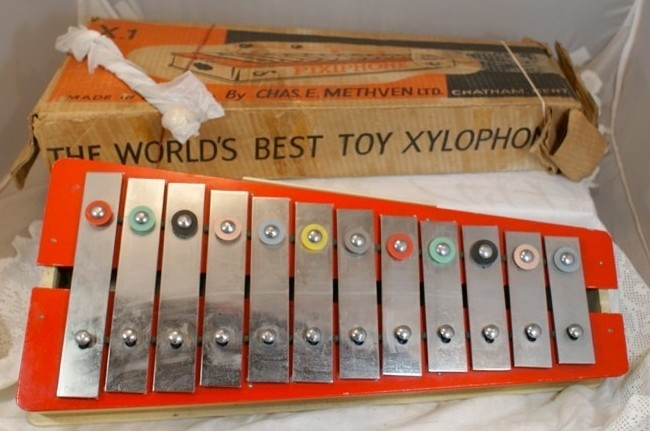
Diatonic Pixiphone, a brand of glockenspiel

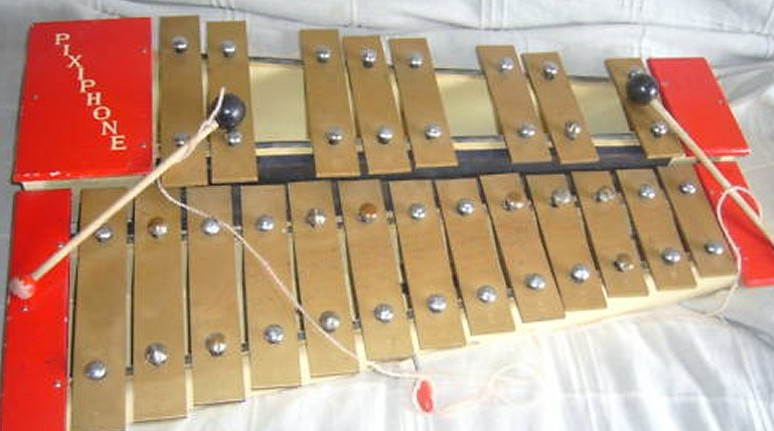
Chromatic Pixiphone

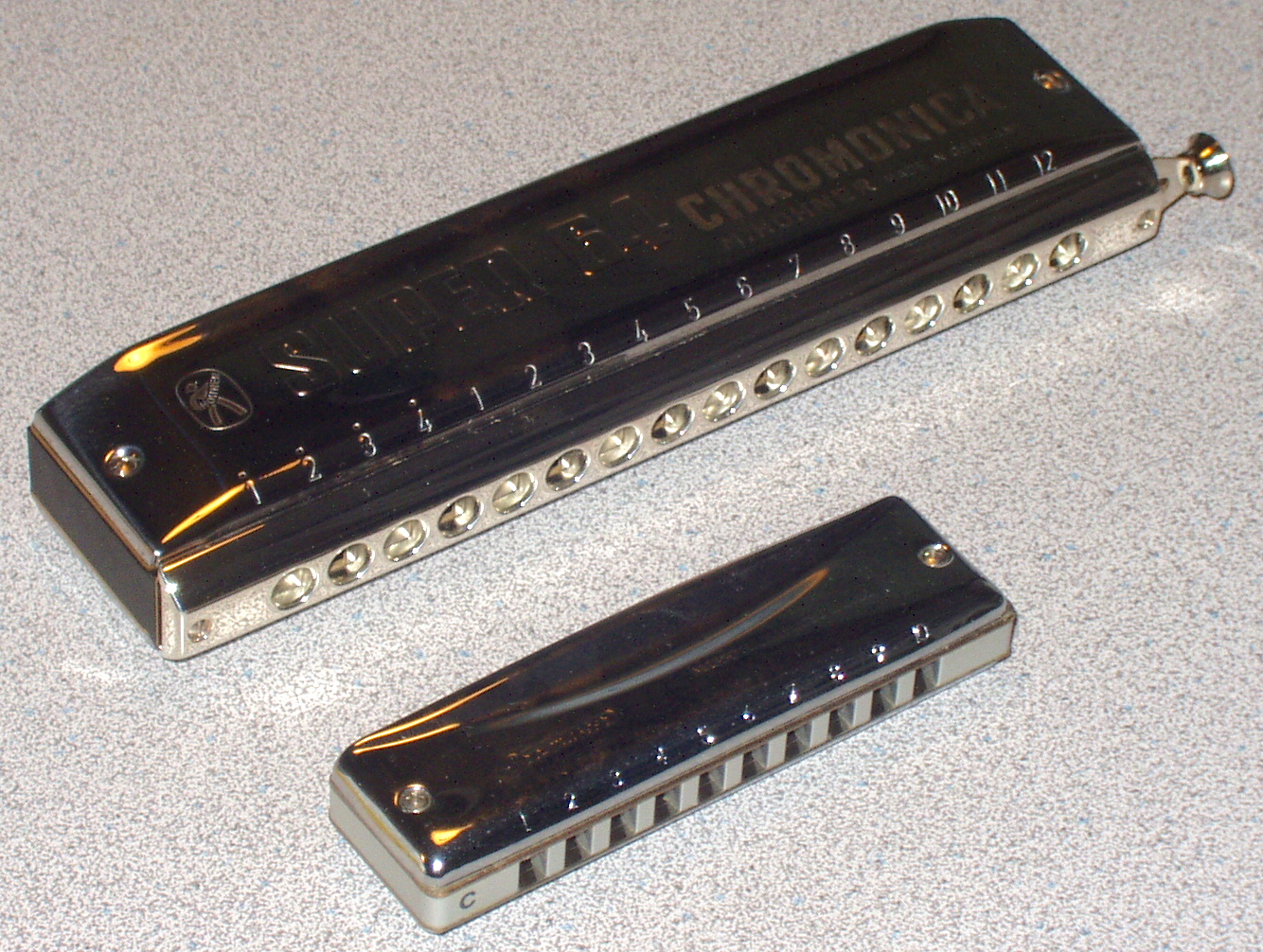
Chromatic (rear) and diatonic harmonicas

== Intervals ==
When one note of an interval is chromatic or when both notes are chromatic, the entire interval is called chromatic. Chromatic intervals arise by raising or lowering one or both notes of a diatonic interval, so that the interval is made larger or smaller by the interval of half step ["altered diatonic intervals"].

— Allen Forte (1979)

Because diatonic scale is itself ambiguous, distinguishing intervals is also ambiguous. (Note: There are several other understandings of the terms diatonic interval and chromatic interval. There are theorists who define all augmented and diminished intervals as chromatic, even though some of these occur in scales that everyone accepts as diatonic. (For example, the diminished fifth formed by B and F, which occurs in C major.) There are even some writers who define all minor intervals as chromatic (Goetschius assesses all intervals as if the lower note were the tonic, and since for him only the major scale is diatonic, only the intervals formed above the tonic in the major are diatonic;). Some theorists take the diatonic interval to be simply a measure of the number of "scale degrees" spanned by two notes (so that F♯–E♭ and F♮–E♮ represent the same "diatonic interval": a seventh); and they use the term chromatic interval to mean the number of semitones spanned by any two pitches (F♯ and E♭ are "at a chromatic interval of nine semitones"). Some theorists use the term diatonic interval to mean an interval named on the assumption of the diatonic system of Western music (so that all perfect, major, minor, augmented, diminished intervals are "diatonic intervals"). It is not clear what chromatic interval would mean, if anything, in parallel with this usage for diatonic. Some theorists use chromatic interval to mean simply semitone, as for example in the article Chromatic fourth. Something close to this usage may be found in print. For example, the term chromatically, as used in: "The trill rises chromatically by step above this harmonic uncertainty, forming a chromatic fourth ..." The term as used in the phrase chromatic fourth itself perhaps means just what it means in chromatic scale, but here applied to a melodic interval rather than a scale.) For example, the interval B♮–E♭ (a diminished fourth, occurring in C harmonic minor) is considered diatonic if the harmonic minor scale is considered diatonic, but chromatic if the harmonic minor scale is not considered diatonic.

Forte lists the chromatic intervals in major and natural minor as the augmented unison, diminished octave, augmented fifth, diminished fourth, augmented third, diminished sixth, diminished third, augmented sixth, minor second, major seventh, major second, minor seventh, doubly diminished fifth, and doubly augmented fourth.

Additionally, the label chromatic or diatonic for an interval may depend on context. For instance, in C major, the interval C–E♭ could be considered a chromatic interval because it does not appear in the prevailing diatonic key; conversely, in C minor it would be diatonic. This usage is still subject to the categorization of scales above, e.g. in the B♮–E♭ example above, classification would still depend on whether the harmonic minor scale is considered diatonic.

=== In different systems of tuning ===
Pythagorean diatonic and chromatic interval: E♮-F♮ and E♮-E♯

Compare

C–E

C–F

C–E♯^{+}^{+}

In cases where intervals are enharmonically equivalent, there is no difference in tuning (and therefore in sound) between them. For example, in 12-tone equal temperament and its multiples, the notes F and E♯ represent the same pitch, so the diatonic interval C–F (a perfect fourth) sounds the same as its enharmonic equivalent—the chromatic interval C–E♯ (an augmented third).

However, in the majority of other tunings (such as 19-tone and 31-tone equal temperament), there is a difference in tuning between notes that are enharmonically equivalent in 12-tone equal temperament. In systems based on a cycle of fifths, such as Pythagorean tuning and meantone temperament, these intervals are labelled diatonic or chromatic intervals. Under a generalized meantone tuning, notes such as G♯ and A♭ are not enharmonically equivalent but are instead different by an amount known as a diesis. Instruments limited to 12 pitches per octave can only produce a chain of 11 fifths, resulting in a "break" at the ends of the chain. This causes intervals that cross the break to be written as augmented or diminished chromatic intervals, with the most notable example being the "wolf fifth" (which is actually a diminished sixth) that occurs when 12-note-per-octave keyboards are tuned to meantone temperaments whose fifths are flatter than those in 12-tone equal temperament. In a generalized meantone temperament, chromatic semitones (E–E♯) are smaller than or equal to diatonic semitones (E–F) in size, With consonant intervals such as the major third, the nearby interval (a diminished fourth in the case of a major third) is generally less consonant.

If the tritone is assumed diatonic, the classification of written intervals on this definition is not significantly different from the "drawn from the same diatonic scale" definition above as long as the harmonic minor and ascending melodic minor scale variants are not included.

== Chords ==
By chromatic linear chord is meant simply a chord entirely of linear origin which contains one or more chromatic notes. A great many of these chords are to be found in the literature.

— Allen Forte (1979)

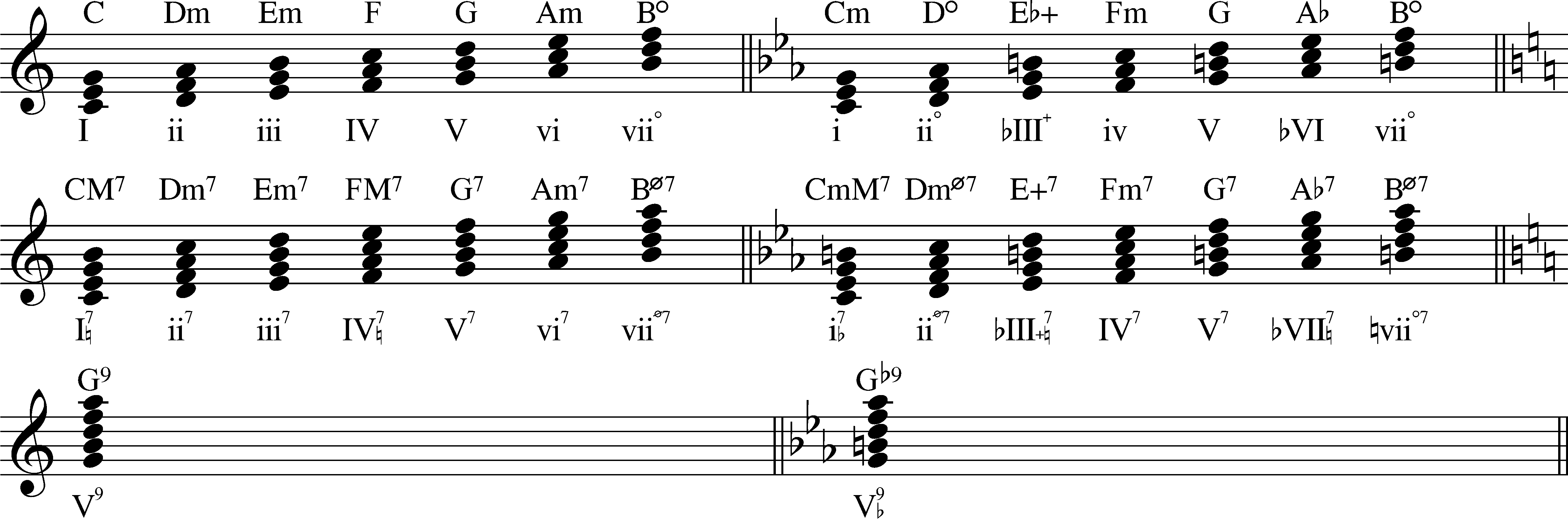
Bernhard Ziehn's 1907 list of, "diatonic triads", diatonic seventh-chords," and two examples of, "diatonic ninth-chords," the "large" and "small" ninth chords; all from the C major or the C harmonic minor scale

Diatonic chords are generally understood as those that are built using only notes from the same diatonic scale; all other chords are considered chromatic. However, given the ambiguity of diatonic scale, this definition, too, is ambiguous. And for some theorists, chords are only ever diatonic in a relative sense: the augmented triad E♭–G–B♮ is diatonic "to" or "in" C minor.

On this understanding, the diminished seventh chord built on the leading note is accepted as diatonic in minor keys.

If the strictest understanding of the term diatonic scale is adhered to – whereby only transposed 'white note scales' are considered diatonic – even a major triad on the dominant scale degree in C minor (G–B♮–D) would be chromatic or altered in C minor. (Note: This is because the third of the triad does not belong to the natural minor scale or Aeolian mode of C minor (C, D, E♭, F, G, A♭, B♭). This highly restrictive interpretation is effectively equivalent to the idea that diatonic triads are those drawn from the notes of the major scale alone, as this source rather roughly puts it: "Diatonic chords are wholly contained within a major scale.") Some writers use the phrase "diatonic to" as a synonym for "belonging to". Therefore a chord is not said to be "diatonic" in isolation, but can be said to be "diatonic to" a particular key if its notes belong to the underlying diatonic scale of the key.

== Harmony ==
The chromatic expansion of tonality which characterizes much of nineteenth century music is illustrated in miniature by the substitution of a chromatic harmony for an expected diatonic harmony. This technique resembles the deceptive cadence, which involves the substitution of another diatonic chord for the expected diatonic goal harmony. ...
In the major mode a substitute chromatic consonance often proves to be a triad which has been taken from the parallel minor mode. This process ["assimilation"]...is called mixture of mode or simply mixture....Four consonant triads from the minor mode may replace their counterparts in the major mode. These we call chromatic triads by mixture.

— Allen Forte (1979)

The words diatonic and chromatic are also applied inconsistently to harmony:

- Often musicians call diatonic harmony any kind of harmony inside the major–minor system of common practice. When diatonic harmony is understood in this sense, the supposed term chromatic harmony means little, because chromatic chords are also used in that same system.
- At other times, especially in textbooks and syllabuses for musical composition or music theory, diatonic harmony means harmony that uses only "diatonic chords". (Note: Often the content of "diatonic harmony" in this sense includes such harmonic resources as diminished sevenths on the leading note – possibly even in major keys – even if the text uses a classification for chords that should exclude those resources.) According to this usage, chromatic harmony is then harmony that extends the available resources to include chromatic chords: the augmented sixth chords, the Neapolitan sixth, chromatic seventh chords, etc. (Note: Some of these are chords "borrowed" from a key other than the prevailing key of a piece; but some are not: they are derivable only by chromatic alteration.)
- Since the word harmony can be used of single classes of chords (dominant harmony, E minor harmony, for example), diatonic harmony and chromatic harmony can be used in this distinct way also. (Note: "Diatonic harmonies are those built on the seven degrees of whatever major or minor diatonic scale is being used. Chromatic harmonies are those built on, or using, the five non-diatonic degrees of the scale." (Strictly, there is an uncertainty to be noted here, involving harmonies that would be diatonic because they are built on unaltered degrees of a diatonic scale, but chromatic because they include a non-diatonic note: D–F♯–A in C major, for example. But the intention is clearly that such harmonies are chromatic.))

However,

- Chromatic harmony may be defined as the use of successive chords that are from two different keys and therefore contain tones represented by the same note symbols but with different accidentals. Four basic techniques produce chromatic harmony under this definition: modal interchange, secondary dominants, melodic tension, and chromatic mediants.

Instrumental compositions of the late Renaissance and early Baroque periods also began experimenting with the expressive possibilities of contrasting diatonic passages of music with chromatic ones. Here, for example is part of the Virginal Piece ‘His Humour’ by Giles Farnaby. (The title ‘Humour’ should be interpreted as meaning ‘mood’, here.) The first four bars are largely diatonic. These are followed by a passage exploiting chromatic harmony, with the upper part forming an ascending, followed by a descending chromatic scale:

Farnaby - His Humour

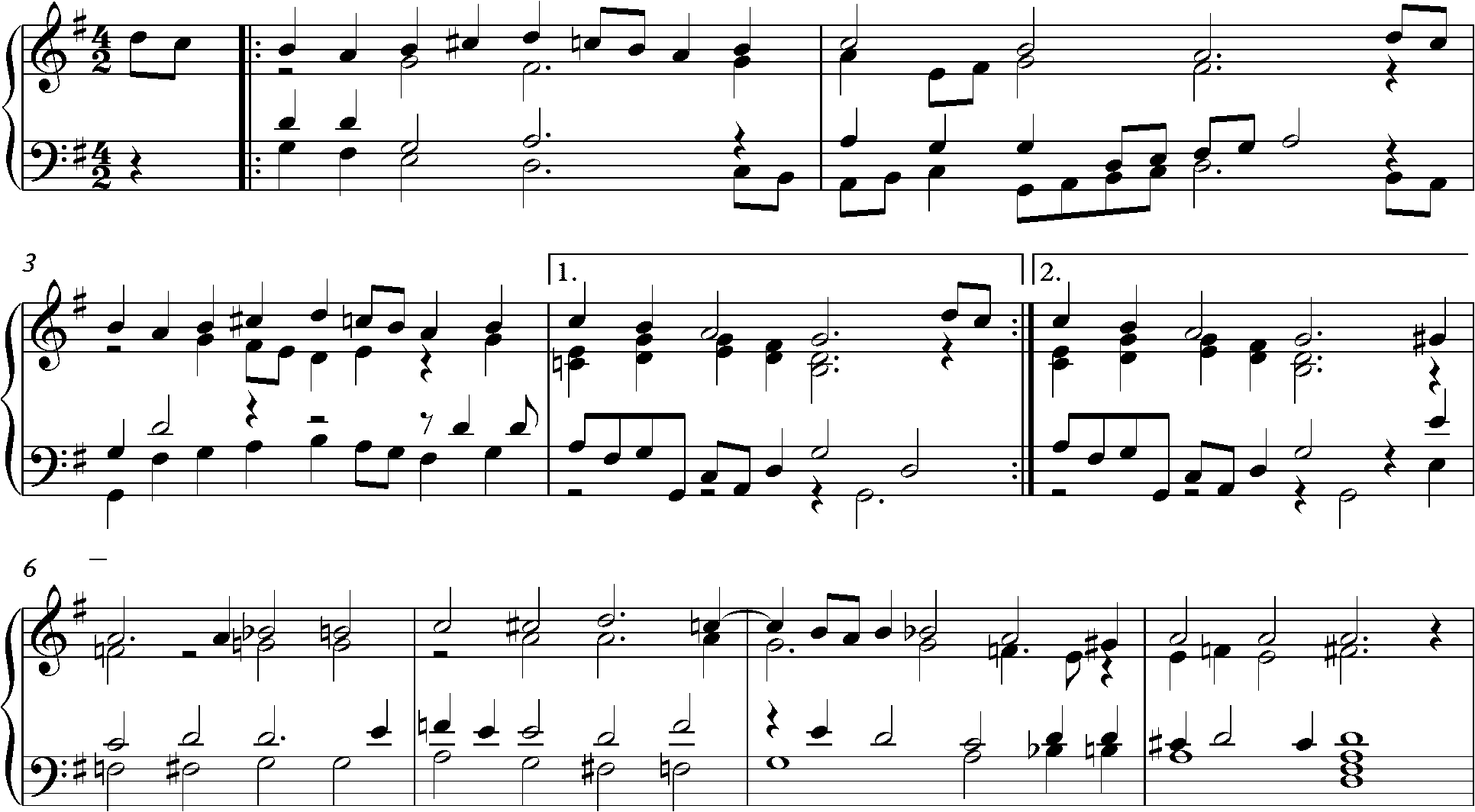
Farnaby - His Humour

In the following passage from the slow movement of Beethoven's Piano Concerto No. 4, Op. 58., the long, flowing melody of the first five bars is almost entirely diatonic, consisting of notes within the scale of E minor, the movement's home key. The only exception is the G sharp in the left hand in the third bar. By contrast, the remaining bars are highly chromatic, using all the notes available to convey a sense of growing intensity as the music builds towards its expressive climax.

Beethoven Piano Concerto 4 slow movement, bars 47–55

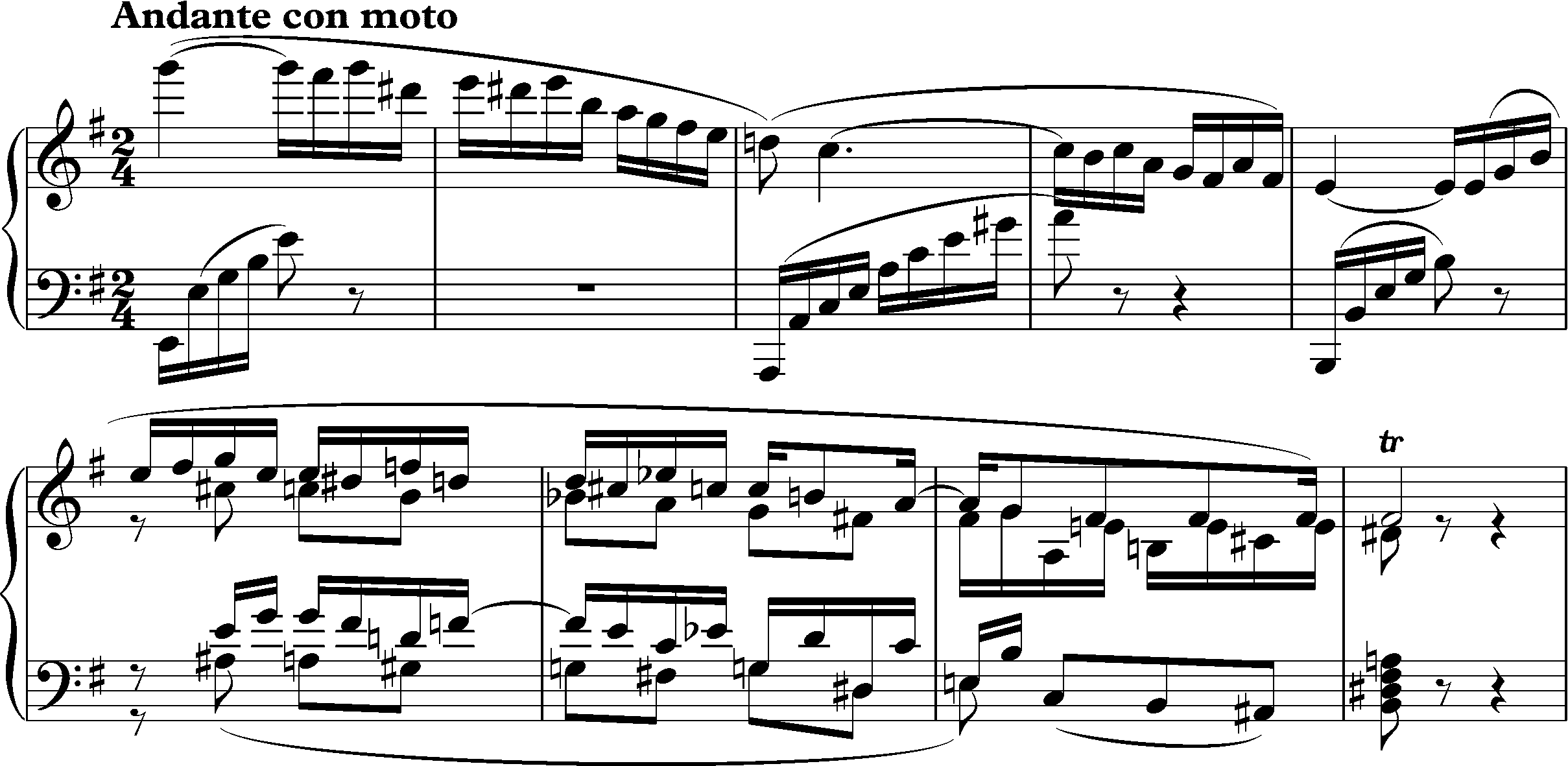
Beethoven Piano Concerto 4 slow movement, bars 47–55

A further example may be found in this extract from act 3 of Richard Wagner's opera Die Walküre. The first four bars harmonize a descending chromatic scale with a rich, intoxicating chord progression. In contrast, the bars that follow are entirely diatonic, using notes only within the scale of E major. The passage is intended to convey the god Wotan putting his daughter Brünnhilde into a deep sleep.

Wagner, Die Walküre, act 3, magic sleep music

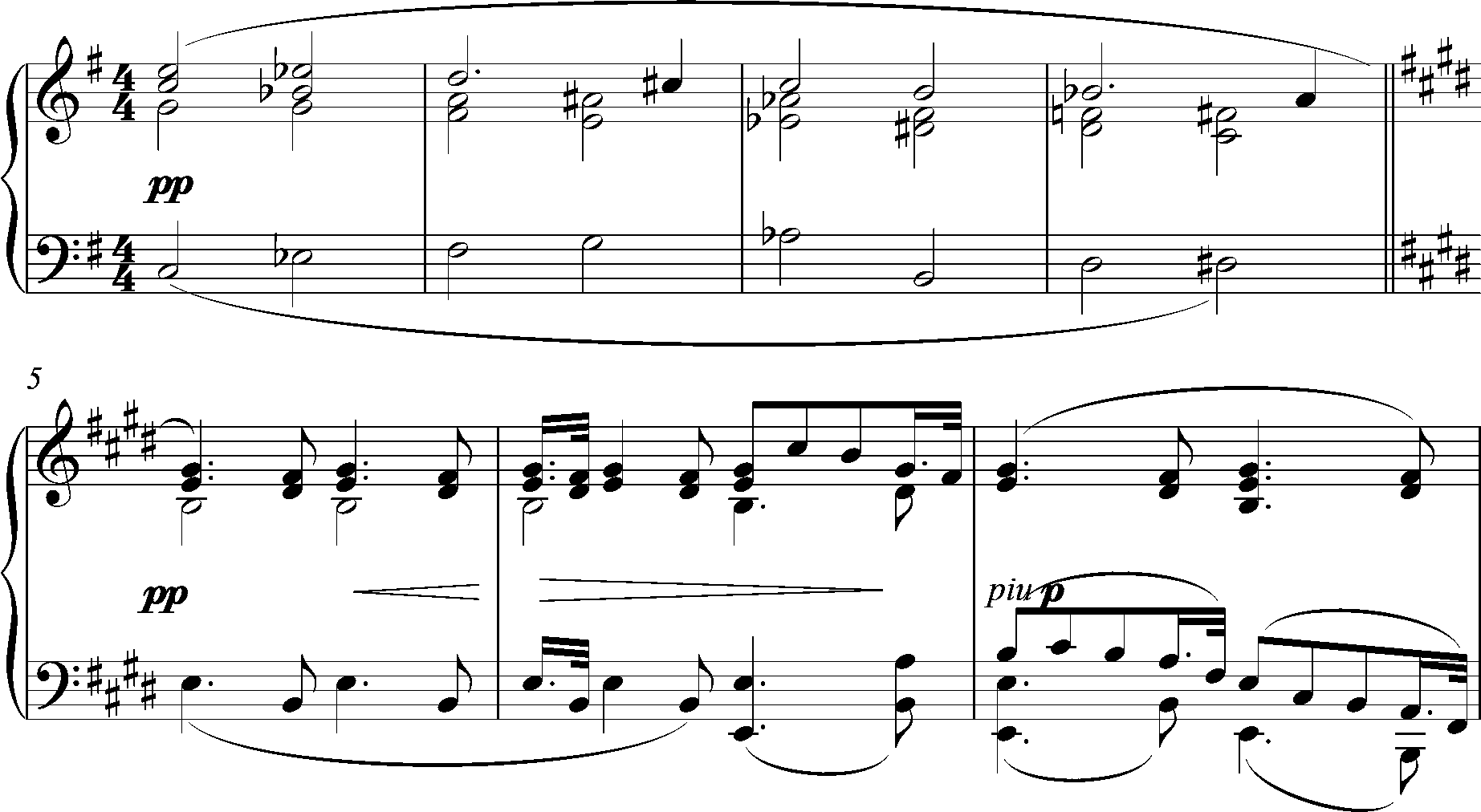
Wagner, Die Walküre, act 3, magic sleep music

== Miscellaneous usages ==
=== Tones ===
Notes which do not belong to the key [those "that lie within the major 2nds" of the diatonic scale] are called chromatic notes.

— Allen Forte (1979)

In modern usage, the meanings of the terms diatonic note/tone and chromatic note/tone vary according to the meaning of the term diatonic scale. Generally – not universally – a note is understood as diatonic in a context if it belongs to the diatonic scale that is used in that context; otherwise it is chromatic.

=== Inflection ===
The term chromatic inflection (alternatively spelt inflexion) is used in two senses:

- Alteration of a note that makes it (or the harmony that includes it) chromatic rather than diatonic.
- Melodic movement between a diatonic note and a chromatically altered variant (from C to C♯ in G major, or vice versa, for example).

=== Progression ===
The term chromatic progression is used in three senses:

- Movement between harmonies that are not elements of any common diatonic system (that is, not of the same diatonic scale: movement from D–F–A to D♯–F♯–A, for example).
- The same as the second sense of chromatic inflection, above.
- In musica ficta and similar contexts, a melodic fragment that includes a chromatic semitone, and therefore includes a chromatic inflection in the second sense, above.

The term diatonic progression is used in two senses:

- Movement between harmonies that both belong to at least one shared diatonic system (from F–A–C to G–B–E, for example, since both occur in C major).
- In musica ficta and similar contexts, a melodic fragment that does not include a chromatic semitone, even if two semitones occur contiguously, as in F♯–G–A♭.

=== Modulation ===
- Diatonic modulation is modulation via a diatonic progression.
- Chromatic modulation is modulation via a chromatic progression, in the first sense given above.

=== Pentatonic scale ===
- One very common kind of pentatonic scale that draws its notes from the diatonic scale (in the exclusive sense, above) is sometimes called the diatonic pentatonic scale: C–D–E–G–A[–C], or some other modal arrangement of those notes.
- Other pentatonic scales (such as the pelog scales) may also be construed as reduced forms of a diatonic scale but are not labelled diatonic.

== Modern extensions ==
Traditionally, and in all uses discussed above, the term diatonic has been confined to the domain of pitch, and in a fairly restricted way. Exactly which scales (and even which modes of those scales) should count as diatonic is unsettled, as shown above. But the broad selection principle itself is not disputed, at least as a theoretical convenience.

=== Extended pitch selections ===
The selection of pitch classes can be generalised to encompass formation of non-traditional scales. Or a larger set of underlying pitch classes may be used instead. For example, the octave may be divided into varying numbers of equally spaced pitch classes. The usual number is twelve, giving the conventional set used in Western music. But Paul Zweifel uses a group-theoretic approach to analyse different sets, concluding especially that a set of twenty divisions of the octave is another viable option for retaining certain properties associated with the conventional "diatonic" selections from twelve pitch classes.

=== Rhythms ===
It is possible to generalise this selection principle even beyond the domain of pitch. The diatonic idea has been applied in analysis of some traditional African rhythms, for example. Some selection or other is made from an underlying superset of metrical beats, to produce a "diatonic" rhythmic "scale" embedded in an underlying metrical "matrix". Some of these selections are diatonic in a way similar to the traditional diatonic selections of pitch classes (that is, a selection of seven beats from a matrix of twelve beats – perhaps even in groupings that match the tone-and-semitone groupings of diatonic scales). But the principle may also be applied with even more generality (including even any selection from a matrix of beats of any size).

== See also ==
- Major and minor
