= Mixolydian mode =

Musical mode

Mixolydian mode may refer to one of three things: the name applied to one of the ancient harmoniai or tonoi, based on a particular octave species or scale, one of another ancient church modes, or a modern musical mode or diatonic scale. The Hypomixolydian mode of music has no modern counterpart.

== Ancient Mixolydian ==
The idea of a Mixolydian mode comes from the music theory of ancient Greece. The invention of the ancient Greek Mixolydian mode was attributed to Sappho, the 7th-century-B.C. poet and musician. However, what the ancient Greeks thought of as Mixolydian is very different from the modern interpretation of the mode. The prefix mixo- (μιξο-) means "mixed", referring to its resemblance to the Lydian mode.

In Greek theory, the Mixolydian tonos (the term "mode" is a later Latin term) employs a scale (or "octave species") corresponding to the Greek Hypolydian mode inverted. In its diatonic genus, this is a scale descending from paramese to hypate hypaton: in the diatonic genus, a whole tone (paramese to mese) followed by two conjunct inverted Lydian tetrachords (each being two whole tones followed by a semitone descending). This diatonic genus of the scale is roughly the equivalent of playing all the white notes of a piano from B to B, which is also known as modern Locrian mode.

In the chromatic and enharmonic genera, each tetrachord consists of a minor third plus two semitones, and a major third plus two quarter tones, respectively.

== Mixolydian and Hypomixolydian ==
The term Mixolydian was originally used to designate one of the traditional harmoniai of Greek theory. It was appropriated later (along with six other names) by 2nd-century theorist Ptolemy to designate his seven tonoi or transposition keys. Four centuries later, Boethius interpreted Ptolemy in Latin, still with the meaning of transposition keys, not scales.

When chant theory was first being formulated in the 9th century, these seven names plus an eighth, Hypermixolydian (later changed to Hypomixolydian), were again re-appropriated in the anonymous treatise Alia Musica. A commentary on that treatise, called the Nova expositio, first gave it a new sense as one of a set of eight diatonic species of the octave, or scales. The name Mixolydian came to be applied to one of the eight modes of medieval church music: the seventh mode. This mode does not run from B to B on white notes, as the Greek mode, but was defined in two ways: as the diatonic octave species from G up one octave to the G above, or as a mode whose final was G and whose ambitus runs from the F below the final to the G above, with possible extensions "by licence" up to A above and even down to E below, and in which the note D (the tenor of the corresponding seventh psalm tone) had an important melodic function. This medieval theoretical construction led to the modern use of the term for the natural scale from G to G.

The seventh mode of western church music is an authentic mode based on and encompassing the natural scale from G to G, with the perfect fifth (the D in a G to G scale) as the dominant, reciting note or tenor.

The plagal eighth mode was termed Hypomixolydian (or "lower Mixolydian") and, like the Mixolydian, was defined in two ways: as the diatonic octave species from D to the D an octave higher, divided at the mode final, G (thus D–E–F–G + G–A–B–C–D); or as a mode with a final of G and an ambitus from C below the final to E above it, in which the note C (the tenor of the corresponding eighth psalm tone) had an important melodic function.

In the Common practice period, the Hypomixolydian is notably used in the Andante maestoso of Beethoven's renowned Ninth symphony finale, through male chorus' plainchant intonation of the "Seid Umschlungen, Millionen" and "Brüder, Uber'm Sternerzelt" episodes. The mode is featured again in the following double fugue, when the plainchant-like "Seid Umschlungen, Millionen" theme gets combined contrapuntally with the Ode to Joy melody.

== Modern Mixolydian ==
The modern Mixolydian scale is the fifth mode of the major scale. That is, it can be constructed by starting on the fifth scale degree (the dominant) of the major scale. Because of this, the Mixolydian mode is sometimes called the dominant scale.

The Mixolydian scale has the formula

1, 2, 3, 4, 5, 6, ♭7, 8

That is, the scale has the same series of tones and semitones as the major scale, but with a minor seventh. As a result, the seventh scale degree is a subtonic, rather than a leading-tone. The flattened seventh of the scale is a tritone away from the mediant (major-third degree) of the key. The order of whole tones and semitones in a Mixolydian scale is

whole, whole, half, whole, whole, half, whole

In the Mixolydian mode, the tonic, subdominant, and subtonic triads are all major, the mediant is diminished, and the remaining triads are minor. A classic Mixolydian chord progression is I-♭VII-IV-V.

The Mixolydian mode is common in non-classical harmony, such as folk, jazz, funk, blues, and rock music. It is often prominently heard in music played on the Great Highland bagpipes.

[In the blues progression, for] example [often] uses D Mixolydian triads ... over the D7 [tonic] chord, then uses G Mixolydian triads ... over the G7 [subdominant] chord, and so on.

As with natural and harmonic minor, Mixolydian is often used with a major seventh degree as a part of the dominant and perfect cadences. "Wild Thing" by The Troggs is a, "perfect example", while others include "Tangled Up in Blue" by Bob Dylan, "Shooting Star" by Bad Company, and "Bold as Love" by Jimi Hendrix.

Klezmer musicians refer to the Mixolydian scale as the Adonai malakh mode. In Klezmer, it is usually transposed to C, where the main chords used are C, F, and G7 (sometimes Gm).

To hear a modern Mixolydian scale, one can play a G-major scale on the piano, but change the F♯ to F♮ (all white keys starting with G).

== Notable music in Mixolydian mode ==
=== Traditional ===
- "Old Joe Clark"
- "Gleanntáin Ghlas' Ghaoth Dobhair" (English: Gweedore's Green Glens), also called "Paddy's Green Shamrock Shores" – A traditional Irish folk song, composed by Francie Mooney (Proinsias Ó Maonaigh). Recorded by the band Altan, with Mooney's daughter Mairéad on lead vocals, on their album Runaway Sunday (1997). Recorded by The Corrs as "Erin Shore" on their album Forgiven Not Forgotten (1995).
- "She Moved Through the Fair" – A traditional Irish folk song. Sometimes called "Our Wedding Day" and sung with different lyrics, such as by vocalist Anne Buckley in Michael Flatley's Lord of the Dance (1996).

=== Classical ===
- "Fughetta super: Dies sind die heilgen zehn Gebot" in G major from Clavier-Übung III, BWV 679 by Johann Sebastian Bach
- Piano Concerto in A minor, third movement, by Edvard Grieg
- Concerto in modo misolidio, P 145 (1925) by Ottorino Respighi
- Surgam et circuibo civitatem by Palestrina

=== Popular ===
- "Sweet Child o' Mine" by Guns N' Roses
- "Thunderstruck" by AC/DC
- "You Really Got Me" by the Kinks
- "I Feel Fine" by the Beatles
- "Express Yourself" by Madonna
- "Norwegian Wood (This Bird Has Flown)" by the Beatles
- "Royals" by Lorde
- "Born This Way" by Lady Gaga
- "Single Ladies (Put a Ring on It)" by Beyoncé
- "Clocks" by Coldplay
- "Happy Together" by the Turtles
- "Epistrophy" by Thelonious Monk
- "Freedom Jazz Dance" by Eddie Harris
- "Dark Star" by Grateful Dead
- "L.A. Woman" by the Doors
- "All Blues" by Miles Davis
- "If I Needed Someone" by the Beatles
- "Marquee Moon" by Television
- "Sweet Home Alabama" by Lynyrd Skynyrd
- "A&W" by Lana Del Rey
- "Cinnamon Girl by Neil Young

== See also ==
- Harikambhoji, the equivalent scale in Carnatic music
- Khamaj, the equivalent scale in Hindustani music
- V–IV–I turnaround, a common modal chord progression when spelled as I–♭VII–IV
- Backdoor cadence
