= Marcus Meibomius =

Marcus Meibomius (c. 1630, Tönningen – 1710/1711, Utrecht) was a Danish scholar. He is best known as a historian of music, as an antiquarian, and as the first librarian at the Denmark's Royal Library. He was also a philologist and mathematician.

== Work ==
Meibomius is best known for his work Antiquae musicae auctores septem of 1652, on ancient Greek music. It printed works, in Greek originals with Latin translation, by Aristoxenos, Cleonides (though attributed to Euclid), anonymous Sectio canonis (also attributed to Euclid), Gaudentius, Nicomachus, Alypius, Bacchius, and Aristides Quintilianus (supported by Martianus Capella). It is now seen as pioneer scholarship, not supplanted until the twentieth century, and largely comprehensive on the topic. He attempted concert performances reconstructing Greek music.

He wrote also on the Bible and classical triremes (Fabrica Triremium, 1671). A well-known figure and intellectual of his times, he was considered a polemicist and a somewhat eccentric figure, about whom anecdotes circulated.

== Bibliography ==
- Antiquae Musicae Auctores Septem. Graece et Latine (1652)
- De Proportionibus (1655), a work attacked by John Wallis in Adversus Meibomium, de proportionibus dialogus (1657)
- Liber de Fabrica Triremium (1671)
- Davidis psalmi X (1690)
- Diogenes Laërtius (1692)
- Davidis Psalmi duodecim, & totidem Sacrae Scripturae Veteris Testamenti integra capita (1698)

Rerum Germanicarum Tom I (some old histories about Germany) found cited in Anton Gottfried Schlichthaber, "Mindische Kirchengeschichte" 1753 III. Theil 3. Stück S. 230 weist auf den Fundations-Brief der Kirche zu Lahde hin.

== Sources ==
- , under Maybaum, gives his birth date as 1630, place of birth Tönningen, Denmark
- , p. 264, gives him as born 1620, and Danish.
- gives dates 1630-1711, gives some career details (work for Queen Christina in Sweden, and in Copenhagen 1653-1663 as librarian). It also implies family relationship to Heinrich Meibom. Similar dates in the Leibniz-Edition's Persons' database (1630-1710/11) and Gail Ewald Scala: An Index of Proper Names in Thomas Birch, 'The History of the Royal Society', Notes and Records of the Royal Society of London, Vol. 28, No. 2, 1974, pp. 263-329, here p. 302 (1630-1711).
