= Tetrachord =

Series of four notes separated by three intervals

Tetrachord based on D, 1½1

2 consecutive tetrachords, heptachord based on D, 1½11½1

In music theory, a tetrachord (Greek: τετράχορδoν; Latin: tetrachordum) is a series of four notes separated by three intervals. In traditional music theory, a tetrachord always spanned the interval of a perfect fourth, a 4:3 frequency proportion (approx. 498 cents)—but in modern use it means any four-note segment of a scale or tone row, not necessarily related to a particular tuning system. Three modal patterns are possible:

and the tritone:

== History ==
The name comes from tetra (from Greek—"four of something") and chord (from Greek chordon—"string" or "note"). In ancient Greek music theory, tetrachord signified a segment of the greater and lesser perfect systems bounded by immovable notes (Greek: ἑστῶτες); the notes between these were movable (Greek: κινούμενοι). It literally means four strings, originally in reference to harp-like instruments such as the lyre or the kithara, with the implicit understanding that the four strings produced adjacent (i.e., conjunct) notes.

Modern music theory uses the octave as the basic unit for determining tuning, where ancient Greeks used the tetrachord. Ancient Greek theorists recognized that the octave is a fundamental interval but saw it as built from two tetrachords and a whole tone.

=== Ancient Greek music theory ===
Ancient Greek music theory distinguishes three genera (singular: genus) of tetrachords. These genera are characterized by the largest of the three intervals of the tetrachord:

Diatonic
A diatonic tetrachord has a characteristic interval that is less than or equal to half the total interval of the tetrachord (or approximately 249 cents). This characteristic interval is usually slightly smaller (approximately 200 cents), becoming a whole tone. Classically, the diatonic tetrachord consists of two intervals of a tone and one of a semitone, e.g., A–G–F–E.
Chromatic
A chromatic tetrachord has a characteristic interval that is greater than about half the total interval of the tetrachord, yet not as great as four-fifths of the interval (between about 249 and 398 cents). Classically, the characteristic interval is a minor third (approximately 300 cents), and the two smaller intervals are equal semitones, e.g., A–G♭–F–E.
Enharmonic

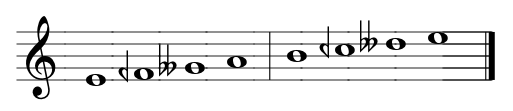
Two Greek tetrachords in the enharmonic genus, forming an enharmonic Dorian scale

An enharmonic tetrachord has a characteristic interval that is greater than about four-fifths of the total tetrachord interval. Classically, the characteristic interval is a ditone or a major third, and the two smaller intervals are variable, but approximately quarter tones, e.g. A–G–F–E.

When the composite of the two smaller intervals is less than the remaining (incomposite) interval, the three-note group is called the pyknón (from pyknós, meaning "compressed"). This is the case for the chromatic and enharmonic tetrachords, but not the diatonic (meaning "stretched out") tetrachord.

Whatever the tuning of the tetrachord, its four degrees are named, in ascending order, hypate, parhypate, lichanos (or hypermese), and mese and, for the second tetrachord in the construction of the system, paramese, trite, paranete, and nete. The hypate and mese, and the paramese and nete are fixed, and a perfect fourth apart, while the position of the parhypate and lichanos, or trite and paranete, are movable.

As the three genera simply represent ranges of possible intervals within the tetrachord, various shades (chroai) with specific tunings were specified. Once the genus and shade of tetrachord are specified, their arrangement can produce three main types of scales, depending on which note of the tetrachord is taken as the first note of the scale. The tetrachords themselves remain independent of the scales that they produce, and were never named after these scales by Greek theorists.

Dorian scale
The first note of the tetrachord is also the first note of the scale.
Diatonic: E–D–C–B | A–G–F–E
Chromatic: E–D♭–C–B | A–G♭–F–E
Enharmonic: E–D–C–B │ A–G–F–E

Phrygian scale
The second note of the tetrachord (in descending order) is the first of the scale.

Diatonic: D–C–B | A–G–F–E | D
Chromatic: D♭–C–B | A–G♭–F–E | D♭
Enharmonic: D–C–B | A–G–F–E | D

Lydian scale
The third note of the tetrachord (in descending order) is the first of the scale.
Diatonic: C–B | A–G–F–E | D–C
Chromatic: C–B | A–G♭–F–E | D♭–C
Enharmonic: C–B | A–G–F–E | D–C

In all cases, the extreme notes of the tetrachords, E – B, and A – E, remain fixed, while the notes in between are different depending on the genus.

=== Pythagorean tunings ===
Here are the traditional Pythagorean tunings of the diatonic and chromatic tetrachords:

Diatonic
hypate		parhypate		lichanos		mese
4/3		81/64		9/8		1/1
│	256/243	│	9/8	│	9/8	│
−498¢		−408¢		−204¢		0¢
Diatonic tetrachord pythagorean tuning

Chromatic
hypate		parhypate		lichanos		mese
4/3		81/64		32/27		1/1
│	256/243	│	2187/2048	│	32/27	│
−498¢		−408¢		−294¢		0¢
Chromatic tetrachord pythagorean tuning

Here is a representative Pythagorean tuning of the enharmonic genus attributed to Archytas:

Enharmonic
hypate		parhypate		lichanos		mese
4/3		9/7		5/4		1/1
│	28/27	│	36/35	│	5/4	│
−498¢		−435¢		−386¢		0¢
Enharmonic tetrachord pythagorean tuning

The number of strings on the classical lyre varied at different epochs, and possibly in different localities – four, seven, and ten having been favorite numbers. Larger scales are constructed from conjunct or disjunct tetrachords. Conjunct tetrachords share a note, while disjunct tetrachords are separated by a disjunctive tone of 9/8 (a Pythagorean major second). Alternating conjunct and disjunct tetrachords form a scale that repeats in octaves (as in the familiar diatonic scale, created in such a manner from the diatonic genus), but this was not the only arrangement.

The Greeks analyzed genera using various terms, including diatonic, enharmonic, and chromatic. Scales are constructed from conjunct or disjunct tetrachords.

Didymos’ chromatic tetrachord	4:3	(6:5)	10:9	(25:24)	16:15	(16:15)	1:1
Eratosthenes’ chromatic tetrachord	4:3	(6:5)	10:9	(19:18)	20:19	(20:19)	1:1
Ptolemy’s soft chromatic	4:3	(6:5)	10:9	(15:14)	28:27	(28:27)	1:1
Ptolemy’s intense chromatic	4:3	(7:6)	8:7	(12:11)	22:21	(22:21)	1:1
Archytas’ enharmonic	4:3	(5:4)	9:7	(36:35)	28:27	(28:27)	1:1

This is a partial table of the superparticular divisions by Chalmers after Hofmann.

== Variations ==
=== Romantic era ===
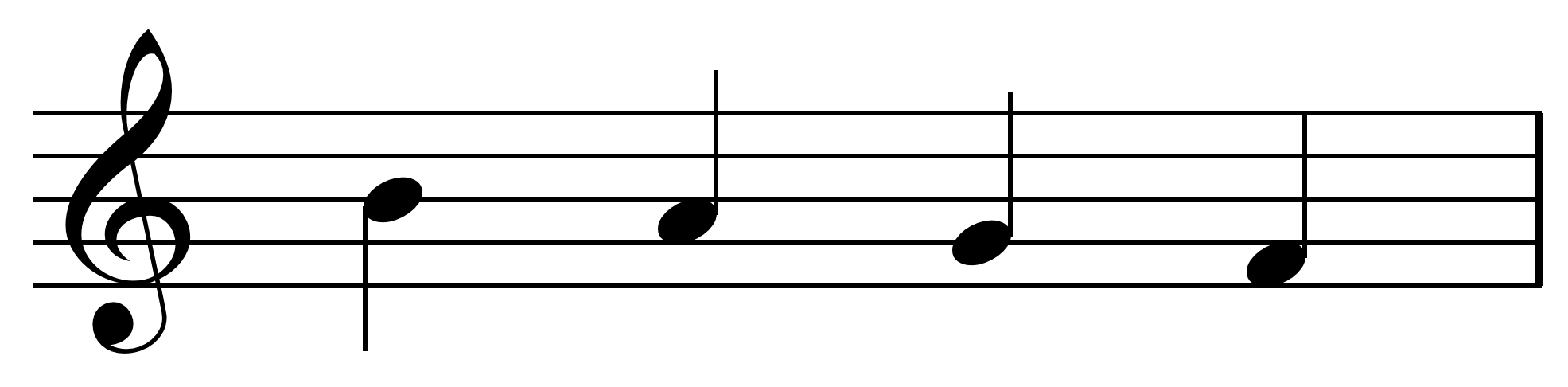
Descending tetrachord in the modern B Locrian: –♭–♭–♭ (b–a–g–f). This tetrachord spans a tritone instead of a perfect fourth.

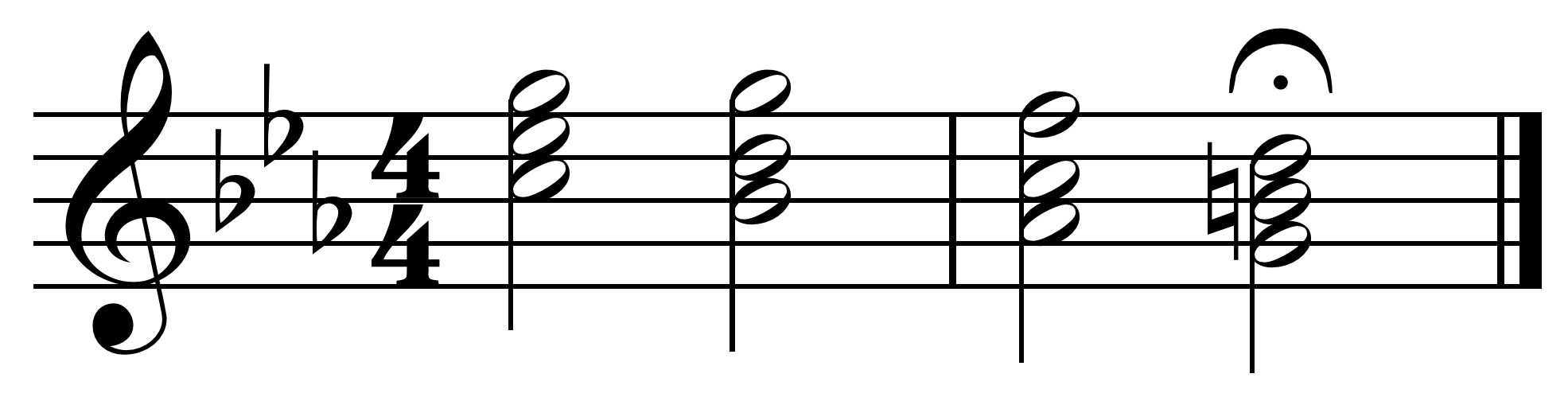
The Phrygian progression creates a descending tetrachord bassline: –♭–♭–. Phrygian half cadence: i–v6–iv6–V in C minor (bassline: c–b♭–a♭–g)

Tetrachords based upon equal temperament tuning were used to explain common heptatonic scales. Given the following vocabulary of tetrachords (the digits give the number of semitones in consecutive intervals of the tetrachord, adding to five):

Tetrachord	Halfstep String
Major	2 2 1
Minor	2 1 2
Harmonic	1 3 1
Upper Minor	1 2 2

The following scales could be derived by joining two tetrachords with a whole step (2) between:

Component tetrachords	Halfstep string	Resulting scale
Major + major	2 2 1 : 2 : 2 2 1	Diatonic major
Minor + upper minor	2 1 2 : 2 : 1 2 2	Natural minor
Major + harmonic	2 2 1 : 2 : 1 3 1	Harmonic major
Minor + harmonic	2 1 2 : 2 : 1 3 1	Harmonic minor
Harmonic + harmonic	1 3 1: 2: 1 3 1	Double harmonic scale or Gypsy major
Major + upper minor	2 2 1 : 2 : 1 2 2	Melodic major
Minor + major	2 1 2 : 2 : 2 2 1	Melodic minor
Upper minor + harmonic	1 2 2 : 2 : 1 3 1	Neapolitan minor

All these scales are formed by two complete disjunct tetrachords: contrarily to Greek and Medieval theory, the tetrachords change here from scale to scale (i.e., the C major tetrachord would be C–D–E–F, the D major one D–E–F♯–G, the C minor one C–D–E♭–F, etc.). The 19th-century theorists of ancient Greek music believed that this had also been the case in Antiquity, and imagined that there had existed Dorian, Phrygian, or Lydian tetrachords. This misconception was denounced in Otto Gombosi's thesis (1939).

=== 20th-century analysis ===
Theorists of the late 20th century often use the term "tetrachord" to describe any four-note set when analysing music of a variety of styles and historical periods. The expression "chromatic tetrachord" may be used in two different senses: to describe the special case consisting of a four-note segment of the chromatic scale, or, in a more historically oriented context, to refer to the six chromatic notes used to fill the interval of a perfect fourth, usually found in descending bass lines. It may also be used to describe sets of fewer than four notes, when used in scale-like fashion to span the interval of a perfect fourth.

=== Atonal usage ===
Allen Forte occasionally uses the term tetrachord to mean what he elsewhere calls a tetrad or simply a "4-element set" – a set of any four pitches or pitch classes. In twelve-tone theory, the term may have the special sense of any consecutive four notes of a twelve-tone row.

== Non-Western scales ==
Tetrachords based upon equal-tempered tuning were also used to approximate common heptatonic scales in use in Indian, Hungarian, Arabian, and Greek musics. Western theorists of the 19th and 20th centuries, convinced that any scale should consist of two tetrachords and a tone, described various combinations supposed to correspond to a variety of exotic scales. For instance, the following diatonic intervals of one, two, or three semitones, always totaling five semitones, produce 36 combinations when joined by whole step:

Lower tetrachords	Upper tetrachords
3 1 1	3 1 1
2 2 1	2 2 1
1 3 1	1 3 1
2 1 2	2 1 2
1 2 2	1 2 2
1 1 3	1 1 3

=== India-specific tetrachord system ===
Tetrachords separated by a halfstep are said to also appear particularly in Indian music. In this case, the lower "tetrachord" totals six semitones (a tritone). The following elements produce 36 combinations when joined by halfstep. These 36 combinations together with the 36 combinations described above produce the so-called "72 karnatic modes".

Lower tetrachords	Upper tetrachords
3 2 1	3 1 1
3 1 2	2 2 1
2 2 2	1 3 1
1 3 2	2 1 2
2 1 3	1 2 2
1 2 3	1 1 3

=== Persian ===
Persian music divides the interval of a fourth differently from the Greek. For example, Al-Farabi describes four genres of the division of the fourth:

- The first genre, corresponding to the Greek diatonic, is composed of a tone, a tone, and a semitone, as G–A–B–C.
- The second genre is composed of a tone, a three-quarter tone, and a three-quarter tone, as G–A–B–C.
- The third genre has a tone and a quarter, a three-quarter tone, and a semitone, as G–A–B–C.
- The fourth genre, corresponding to the Greek chromatic, has a tone and a half, a semitone, and a semitone, as G–A♯–B–C.

He continues with four other possible genres "dividing the tone in quarters, eighths, thirds, half thirds, quarter thirds, and combining them in diverse manners". Later, he presents possible positions of the frets on the lute, producing ten intervals dividing the interval of a fourth between the strings:

Frequency ratio:	1/ 1	256/ 243	18/ 17	162/ 149	54/ 49	9/ 8	32/ 27	81/ 68	27/ 22	81/ 64	4/ 3
Note name:	C	C^{♯-}	C^{♯}	C	C	D	E^{♭-}	E^{♭+}	E	E^{-}	F
Cents:	0	90	99	145	168	204	294	303	355	408	498

If one considers that the interval of a fourth between the strings of the lute (Oud) corresponds to a tetrachord, and that there are two tetrachords and a major tone in an octave, this would create a 25-tone scale. A more inclusive description (where Ottoman, Persian, and Arabic overlap), of the scale divisions is that of 24 quarter tones (see also Arabian maqam). It should be mentioned that Al-Farabi's, among other Islamic musical treatises, also contained additional division schemes, as well as providing a gloss of the Greek system, as Aristoxenian doctrines were often included.

== Compositional forms ==
The tetrachord, a fundamentally incomplete fragment, is the basis of two compositional forms constructed upon repetition of that fragment: the complaint and the litany.

The descending tetrachord from tonic to dominant, typically in minor (e.g., A–G–F–E in A minor), had been used since the Renaissance to denote a lamentation. Well-known cases include the ostinato bass of Dido's aria When I am laid in earth in Henry Purcell's Dido and Aeneas, the Crucifixus in Johann Sebastian Bach's Mass in B minor, BWV 232, or the Qui tollis in Mozart's Mass in C minor, KV 427, etc. This tetrachord, known as lamento ("complaint", "lamentation"), has been used until today. A variant form, the full chromatic descent (e.g. A–G♯–G–F♯–F–E in A minor), has been known as Passus duriusculus in the Baroque Figurenlehre.

There exists a short, free musical form of the Romantic Era, called complaint or complainte (Fr.) or lament. It is typically a set of harmonic variations in homophonic texture, wherein the bass descends through some tetrachord, possibly that of the previous paragraph, but usually one suggesting a minor mode. This tetrachord, treated as a very short ground bass, is repeated again and again over the length of the composition.

Another musical form of the same time period is the litany or litanie (Fr.), or lytanie (OE spur). It is also a set of harmonic variations in homophonic texture, but in contrast to the lament, here the tetrachordal fragment – ascending or descending and possibly reordered – is set in the upper voice in the manner of a chorale prelude. Because of the extreme brevity of the theme and number of repetitions required, and free of the binding of chord progression to tetrachord in the lament, the breadth of the harmonic excursion in litany is usually notable.

== See also ==
- All-interval tetrachord
- Diatonic and chromatic
- Jins
- Lament bass
- Tetrad
- Tetratonic scale
- Heptachord

== Sources ==
- Al-Farabi (2001) [1930]. Kitābu l-mūsīqī al-kabīr [La musique arabe] (in French). Translated by d'Erlanger, Rodolphe (reprint ed.). Paris, FR: Geuthner.
- Chalmers, John H., Jr. (1993). Polansky, Larry; Scholz, Carter (eds.). Divisions of the Tetrachord: A prolegomenon [introduction] to the construction of musical scales. Harrison, Lou (foreword). Hanover, NH: Frog Peak Music. ISBN 0-945996-04-7 – via eamusic.dartmouth.edu.
- Dupré, Marcel (1962) [1925]. Cours complet d'improvisation à l'orgue [Complete Course in Organ Improvisation] (in French). Translated by Fenstermaker, John. Paris: Alphonse Leduc. ASIN B0006CNH8E. (2 vols.)
