= Alypius of Alexandria =

4th-century Greek writer

Alypius of Alexandria (Ancient Greek: Ἀλύπιος) was a Greek writer on music who flourished in the 4th century CE. Of his works, only a small fragment has been preserved, under the title of Introduction to Music (Εἰσαγωγὴ Μουσική).

== Works ==
The work of Alypius consists wholly, with the exception of a short introduction, of lists of the symbols used (both for voice and instrument) to denote all the sounds in the forty-five scales produced by taking each of the fifteen modes in the three genera (diatonic, chromatic, enharmonic). It treats, therefore, in fact, of only one (the fifth, namely) of the seven branches into which the subject is, as usual, divided in the introduction; and may possibly be merely a fragment of a larger work. It would have been most valuable if any considerable number of examples had been left us of the actual use of the system of notation described in it; very few remain, and they seem to belong to an earlier stage of the science. However, Alypius's work remains the best source of modern knowledge of the musical notes of the Greeks, including a comprehensive account of the Greek system of scales, transpositions, and musical notation, and serves to throw some light on the obscure history of the modes.

The text, which seemed hopelessly corrupt to its first contemporary editor, classical scholar Johannes Meursius, was nevertheless restored, apparently with success, by the Danish scholar Marcus Meibomius. Introduction to Music was printed with the tables of notation in Meibomius' Antiquae Musicae Scriptores, (in quarto, Amsterdam 1652). Meibomius not only made use of the manuscript belonging to Joseph Scaliger, but others also existing in England and Italy. Karl von Jan published an authoritative edition in Musici Scriptores Graeci, 1895-1899.

== Identity ==
There are no tolerably sure grounds for identifying Alypius with any one of the various persons who bore the name in the times of the later emperors, and of whose history anything is known. Jean-Benjamin de la Borde places him towards the end of the 4th century. According to the most plausible conjecture, he was that Alypius whom the writer Eunapius, in his Life of Iamblichus, celebrates for his acute intellect (ὁ διαλεκτικώτατος Ἀλύπιος) and diminutive stature, and who, being a friend of Iamblichus, probably flourished under the emperor Julian the Apostate and his immediate successors, that is, during the 4th century. This Alypius was a native of Alexandria, and died there at an advanced age, and therefore can hardly have been the person whom the Roman historian Ammianus Marcellinus called "Alypius Antiochensis", who was employed by the emperor Julian in his attempt to rebuild the Jewish temple. Julian addresses two epistles (29 and 30) to Alypius (Ἰουλινὸς Ἀλυπίῳ ἀδελφῷ Καισαρίου), in one of which he thanks him for a geographical treatise or chart; it would seem more likely that this was Alypius of Antioch, instead of the Alypius from Alexandria, although Meursius supposes the two were the same.

Iamblichus wrote a life of the Alexandrian Alypius, although it is no longer extant.

== Sources ==
- Translation of this book into Modern Greek, along with comments and explanation notes, by Athanasios G. Siamakis, Archimandritis, published by Prespes 2003, second edition. pages 140.
- Mathiesen, Thomas J. (2016) [2001]. "Alypius". Grove Music Online. Oxford: Oxford University Press. doi:10.1093/gmo/9781561592630.article.00718. ISBN 978-1-56159-263-0. (subscription, Wikilibrary access, or UK public library membership required)
