= Enharmonic scale =

Ancient Greek musical scale

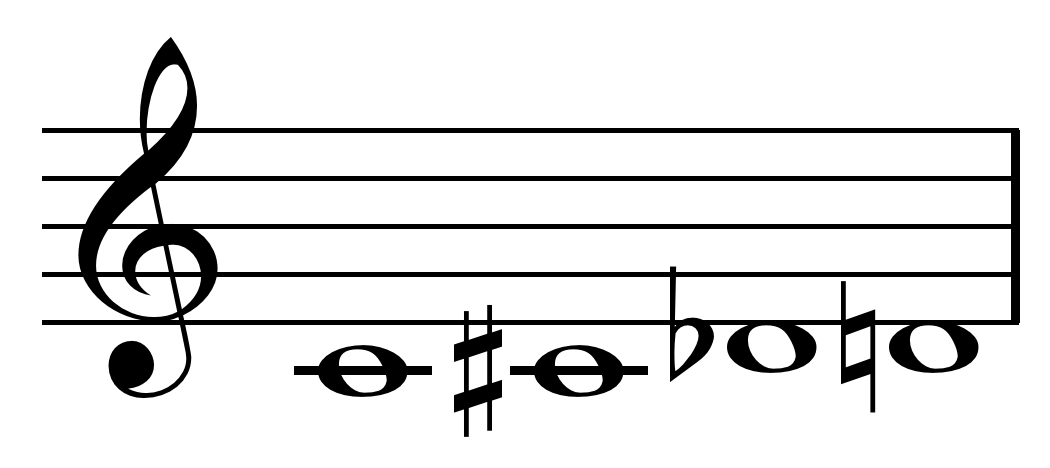
Enharmonic scale [segment] on C. Note that in this depiction C♯ and D♭ are distinct rather than equivalent as in modern notation.

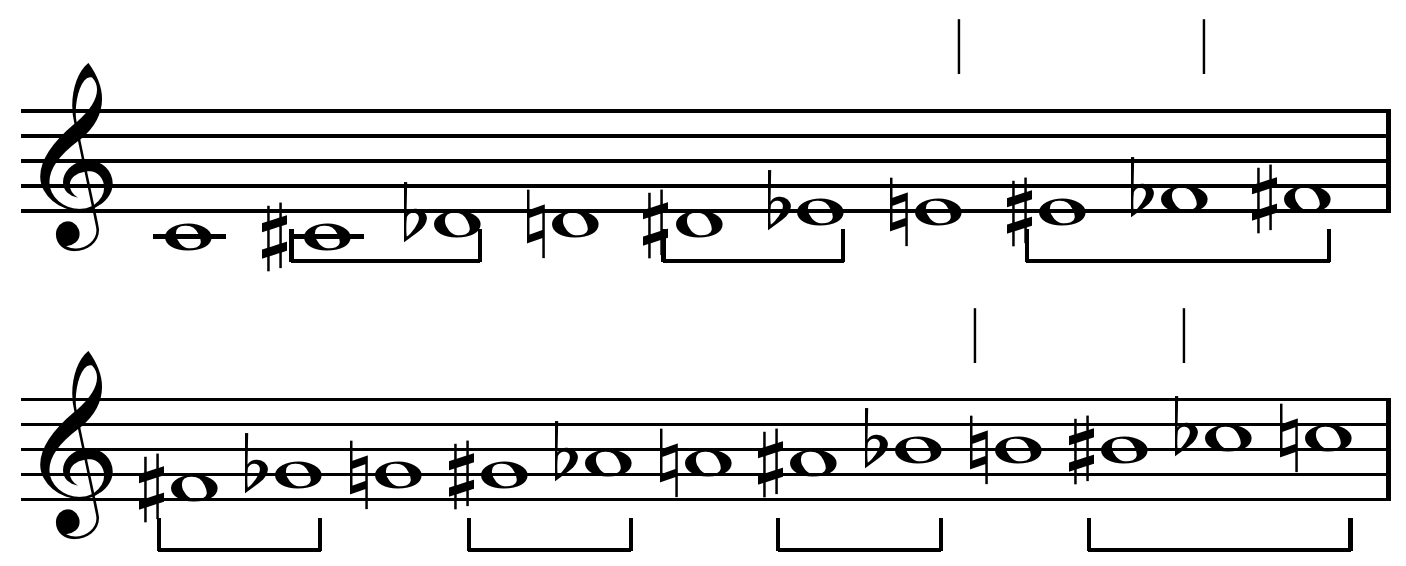
Enharmonic scale on C.

In music theory, an enharmonic scale is an ancient Greek musical scale which contains four notes tuned to approximately quarter tone pitches, bracketed (as pairs) between four fixed pitches. For example, in modern microtonal notation, one of the several enharmonic scales aligned with the conventional key of C major would be

C (0 ¢), D (400 ¢), E (450 ¢), F (500 ¢),
G (700 ¢), A (1000 ¢), B(1150 ¢), c′ (1200 ¢).

The symbol in this example represents a half-sharp, or sharpening by a quartertone (50 cents), although raising pitch by exactly 50 cents is not at all required, nor even usual among the different Greek enharmonic tunings, which tended instead to have the movable, inner notes (here, D & E; A & B) variably spaced, with about 20~30 cents between each other, and likewise spaced from their closest fixed note (for this example those are C, F, G, and c′).

== Bracketing tetrachords ==
Four of the scale notes – the tonic (C in the example), subdominant (F), dominant (G ), and octave (c′) – are all fixed: They are nearly exactly the same relative pitches in all three categories of ancient Greek scales (enharmonic, chromatic, and diatonic), and in ancient Greek music, the fixed tones relative pitches were very nearly the same as the corresponding notes in the modern conventional scale. On the other hand, the four notes contained between the brackets, from the example D and E (between C and F); and A and B (between G and c′) are the two pairs of bracketed, variable notes; they can have nearly any pitch. After pitches chosen for them, if the interval between a movable note and any other note is about a quarter tone or less, the scale is called "enharmonic". The small, or "microtonal" interval can be between either of the bracketing fixed notes, or from the other movable note, inside the bracket.

Despite the music of India and the Middle East still using similar intervals in traditional and classical scales, even the idea of the very small pitch intervals used in the enharmonic scale has lain outside the competence of musicians trained in occidental music at least since the time of the early Roman Empire.

== Difference in meaning of "enharmonic" between the classical-era and now ==
The ancient Greek meaning of enharmonic is that the scale contains at least one very narrow interval. (The spacing of each pair notes between their bracketing fixed notes is usually either approximately or exactly the same, so when there is one narrow interval in one bracket there is almost always another one inside the other bracket.) Modern musical vocabulary has re-used the word "enharmonic" altered to have the most extreme possible meaning of its ancient sense, to mean two differently-named notes which happen to actually have the same pitch. In ancient Greek music from which enharmonic scales come, the meaning of enharmonic not so extreme: It means that the notes are not actually the same, but do only differ in pitch by a very slight amount, and had a similar connotation to "microtonal" in modern musical vocabulary.

Since an enharmonic scale uses (approximately) quarter tones, or more technically dieses (divisions) which do not occur on standard modern keyboards, nor were even used in the preceding western tuning systems, such as ¼ comma temperament (the predominant tuning about 200 years ago) or well temperament (finally went out of use as conventional tuning about 140~150 years ago) the pitches and intervals in the several ancient Greek enharmonic scales are foreign to nearly any modern-trained musician, and generally outside the scope of musical competence of modern occidental musicians: People playing modern fixed-pitch instruments have no opportunity to experiment with musical scales containing these notes, since piano keyboards only have provisions for half tones, as do frets on guitars and mandolins, fingering holes on woodwinds, and valves on brass instruments. This has been the situation for more than 150 years for fixed-pitch occidental instruments.

Even among Hellenic musicians, enharmonic scales appear to have gone out of style around 2500 years ago, and only persisted as a perfunctory part of normal musical training; enharmonic scales seem to have been oddities even to the Greek writers in the Roman Empire, whose works on music theory we still have. So the idea of such very small pitch intervals used in the enharmonic scale has lain outside of the scope of musicians' training for occidental music, despite music of India and the Middle East still using similar intervals traditional and classical scales.

== Unfamiliar, variable-size quarter tones ==
An otherwise well regarded 19th century musicologist once wrote the rather blatantly false definition in his 1905 musical dictionary, that the enharmonic scale is

... "an [imaginary] gradual progression by quarter tones" or any "[musical] scale proceeding by quarter tones". — Elson (1905)

However, enharmonic tuning does seem "imaginary" to many modern western musicians because of the intentional limitations placed into conventional tuning, and deficient musical training which only prepares modern students to deal with a single tuning system, even though many others were in use in the west in the recent past, and still more are in current use in other parts of the world. Even well-educated musicologists have little or no understanding of ancient Greek musical scales (among whom sits Elson) nor even relatively recently disused tuning systems, such as the ¼ comma meantone temperament predominantly used up to the time of Bach, and the later unequal well temperaments based on it.

The enharmonic scale was a very real tuning system that survived from pre-classical Greek music (when it seems to have been put to more use) into the Roman Imperial era. Although still taught as a perfunctory part of Hellenistic education, the enharmonic scale was only rarely – if ever – used during the period of 180~400 CE when the Greek musical theory books which still survive were written.

The enharmonic scale uses dieses (divisions) which are not tuned in any pitch present on standard modern keyboards, since modern, standard keyboards only have provisions for half-tone steps. The two different notations used for vocal and instrumental notes in ancient Greek music notation are more tonally versatile, since they are based on quarter-tones = half-sharps, with step sizes that could be altered from a strict quarter tone step. Despite the pitches being unknown to naïve occidentally-trained musicians, all the ancient Greek tuning systems only require seven distinct pitches in a completed octave, and only the four of those pitches, the two that lie between the fixed tonic and subdominant (or fourth) (relative to C^{Maj}, the notes between C and F), and the other two movable notes between fixed dominant / fifth and the octave (between G and c′). When expressing notes with modern letter notation, it is conventional to use some elaborately sharpened or flattened version of the notes D, E, A, and B, representing not their precise pitches, but merely to follow the modern standard of giving every distinct pitch in a scale its own, separate letter.

Since the ancient Greek pitch systems only require eight different notes in a completed octave, and a modern keyboard has twelve, there actually are more than enough keys on any keyboard to implement one of the several enharmonic scales, contrary to Elson's remark calling them "imaginary". The only difficulty is retuning the strings (on an acoustic piano or harpsichord) or convincing an electronic sound module (for a modern electronic keyboard) to produce the bizarre pitches required for enharmonic scale D, E, A, and B notes; the fixed notes (C, F, G, and c′) may also need comparatively slight adjustments, but in enharmonic scales they are all very nearly (or even exactly) tuned to the same relative pitches they have in the conventional modern scale.

For example, in modern microtonal notation, and standard-pitch quarter tones (approximately 50 ¢ up =, down =), a simplified version of one of the enharmonic scales is

C (0 ¢), D (50 ¢), E (100 ¢), F (500 ¢),
G (700 ¢), A (750 ¢), B (800 ¢), c′ (1200 ¢).

None of the pitches used in any standard enharmonic scale would actually be rounded to the nearest 50 ¢, but the approximate positions would be within about ±20 ¢ of those shown. It is also not necessary for the movable pitches to all lean toward their lower-bound fixed note; a somewhat more realistic example would be

C (0 ¢), D (380 ¢), E (420 ¢), F (500 ¢),
G (700 ¢), A (970 ¢), B(1130 ¢), c′ (1200 ¢).

The symbol in this instance represents a half-sharp, or sharpening by a quartertone, however the actual pitches for ancient Greek music the half sharp and double sharp pitches were allowed to be anything between around = 30~70 cents, and = 130~240 cents, depending on the aesthetics of the musician tuning the instrument.

Note that the modern sharp (♯), flat (♭), half-sharp, and half-flat symbols do not (usually) represent fixed pitch changes when used to annotate ancient Greek notes, but instead only the approximate location of the actual pitches used in the Greek scale.

Although the movable notes are highly variable when a scale is devised, after the choice is made, all the notes are stuck in their respective positions until the end of a musical piece. So their use is not like modern musical forms, like the blues, that use pitch bend on notes played on pitch elsewhere, and for those modern styles that use sliding pitch, at least in principle, any note might be bent during performance. As far as now known, the only form of "pitch bend" used by the ancient Greeks was in the initial tuning, with a bent pitch remaining bent until the instrument was retuned for the next piece of music.

More broadly, an enharmonic scale is a scale in which (using standard notation) there is no exact equivalence between a sharpened note and the flattened note it is enharmonically related to, such as in the quarter tone scale. As an example, F♯ and G♭ are equivalent in a chromatic scale (the same sound is spelled differently), but they are different sounds in an enharmonic scale (as well as nearly every known musical tuning except for the modern 12-tone E.T. scale). (See: musical tuning for a more complete introduction to the many non-12-tone E.T. tuning systems.)

Musical keyboards which distinguish between enharmonic notes are called by some modern scholars enharmonic keyboards, and more generically microtonal keyboards. (The enharmonic genus, a tetrachord with roots in early Greek music, is only loosely related to enharmonic scales.)

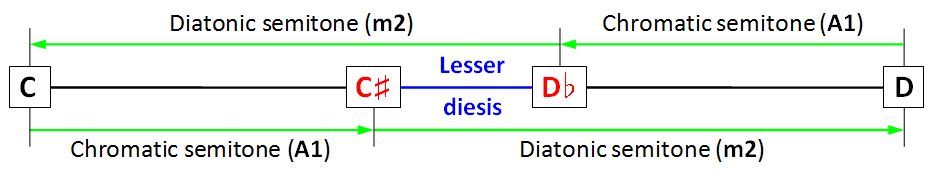
Diesis defined in quarter-comma meantone as a diminished second ( _{min}2nd − ^{Aug}1st ≈ 117.1 − 76.0 ≈ 41.1 cents), or an interval between two enharmonically equivalent notes (from D♭ to C♯).

== Example of a modern, multi-tone enharmonic scale ==
As opposed to ancient Greek enharmonic scales, which only employed seven notes in an octave, modern musicians have expanded the idea of an "enharmonic scale" to include most of the pitches which ancient Greek tuning might select from to create a seven pitch octave. This gives the modern musician options for in-effect modulating between multiple different ancient Greek scales. This creates musical options that, as far as we now understand, was never possible for ancient Greeks musicians. Although note that some kitharodes were musically experimental and inventive, and sought musical novelty, so they might well have imagined alternating between different enharmonic scales. They might even accomplished it, by one musician switching between several different kitharas during a performance, with each tuned to a different, but tonally interlocking enharmonic scale.

Consider a scale constructed through Pythagorean tuning: A Pythagorean scale can be constructed "upwards" by wrapping a chain of perfect fifths around an octave, but it can also be constructed "downwards" by wrapping a chain of perfect fourths around the same octave. By juxtaposing these two slightly different scales, it is possible to create an enharmonic scale.

The following Pythagorean scale is enharmonic:

Note	Ratio	Decimal	Cents	Difference (cents)
C	1:1	1	0	
D♭	256:243	1.05350	90.225	23.460
C♯	2187:2048	1.06787	113.685	23.460
D	9:8	1.125	203.910	
E♭	32:27	1.18519	294.135	23.460
D♯	19683:16384	1.20135	317.595	23.460
E	81:64	1.26563	407.820	
F	4:3	1.33333	498.045	
G♭	1024:729	1.40466	588.270	23.460
F♯	729:512	1.42383	611.730	23.460
G	3:2	1.5	701.955	
A♭	128:81	1.58025	792.180	23.460
G♯	6561:4096	1.60181	815.640	23.460
A	27:16	1.6875	905.865	
B♭	16:9	1.77778	996.090	23.460
A♯	59049:32768	1.80203	1019.550	23.460
B	243:128	1.89844	1109.775	
C′	2:1	2	1200	

In the above scale the following pairs of notes are said to be enharmonic:

- C♯ and D♭
- D♯ and E♭
- F♯ and G♭
- G♯ and A♭
- A♯ and B♭

In this example, natural notes are sharpened by multiplying its frequency ratio by 256/ 243 (called a limma), and a natural note is flattened by multiplying its ratio by 243/ 256 . A pair of enharmonic notes are separated by a Pythagorean comma, which is equal to 531441/ 524288 (about 23.46 cents).
