= Aristides Quintilianus =

Greek author

Aristides Quintilianus (Greek: Ἀριστείδης Κοϊντιλιανός) was the Greek author of an ancient musical treatise, Perì Musikês (Περὶ Μουσικῆς, i.e. On Music; Latin: De Musica)

According to Theodore Karp, his three-volume work on music "constitutes one of the principal sources of modern knowledge of ancient Greek music and its relationship to other disciplines". According to the 17th-century scholar Marcus Meibomius, in whose collection (Antiq. Musicae Auc. Septem, 52) this work was printed for the first time in 1652, it contains everything on music that is to be found in antiquity.

The dates of Aristides are uncertain. In his book he refers to Cicero (d. 43 BC), and his work was used by Martianus Capella (fl. 410-420). According to Thomas J. Mathiesen, Aristides flourished in the late 3rd or early 4th century AD. One piece of evidence for Aristides' date, according to Winnington-Ingram, is that fact in the work he addresses two friends called Eusebius and Florentius; the latter name is unknown before AD 300.

Book 1 of the work deals with the theory of music under the traditional headings of harmonics, rhythm, and metre. It depends heavily on Aristoxenus (4th century BC), but with some "intriguing additions", apparently from a source from the classical period. Book 2 (said by Winnington-Ingram to be "extremely interesting") discusses the importance of music in the education of the young and in the moral life of individuals. Book 3 discusses the arithmetic of music and explores from the point of view of Platonic philosophy the analogies between numbers in music and numbers in the physical world.
