= Cleonides =

Ancient Greek musicologist and music theorist

Cleonides (Greek: Κλεονείδης) is the author of a Greek treatise on music theory titled Εἰσαγωγὴ ἁρμονική Eisagōgē harmonikē (Introduction to Harmonics). The date of the treatise, based on internal evidence, can be established only to the broad period between the 3rd century BCE and the 4th century CE; however, treatises titled eisagōgē generally began to appear only in the 1st century BCE, which seems the most likely period for Cleonides' work.

The attribution of the Eisagōgē in some manuscripts to Euclid or Pappus is incompatible with the Aristoxenian approach adopted in the treatise. A few manuscripts name a "Zosimus" as the author.

Cleonides' treatise is the clearest account of the technical aspects of Aristoxenus's musical theory.
