= Gaudentius (music theorist) =

Gaudentius was a Greek music theorist in Classical Antiquity. Nothing is known of his life or background, or when he lived, except what can be inferred from his sole surviving work, Εἰσαγωγὴ ἁρμονική (English: Harmonic Introduction), a treatise.

Leonhard Schmitz and Karl von Jan say that he seems to have known the writings of Aristoxenus (fl. 335 BCE); but Schmitz says, not those of Ptolemy (c. 100-170 CE). Hugo Riemann says he may have been a younger contemporary of Ptolemy.

Cassiodorus (c. 485-585) praises the treatise, and mentions a contemporary Latin translation for use in schools by one Mutianus, which has not survived. The treatise was first printed in 1652 by Marcus Meibomius, together with a commentary and a Latin translation, in his Antiquae musicae auctores septem (English: Ancient Music by Seven Authors).
