= Ditone =

Interval in music

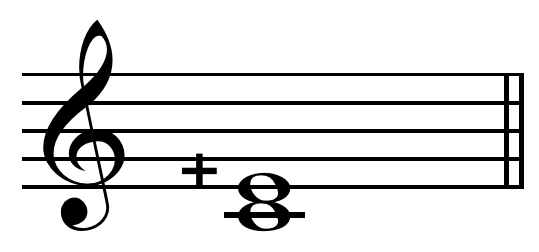
Pythagorean ditone on C

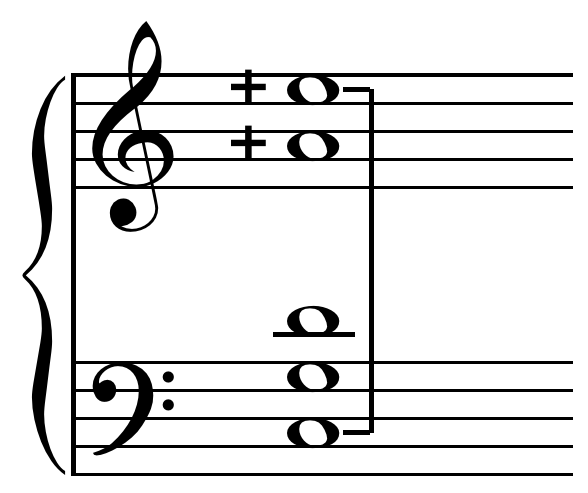
Pythagorean ditone as four just perfect fifths

In music, a ditone (Latin: ditonus, from Ancient Greek: δίτονος, "of two tones") is the interval of a major third. The size of a ditone varies according to the sizes of the two tones of which it is compounded. The largest is the Pythagorean ditone, with a ratio of 81:64, also called a comma-redundant major third; the smallest is the interval with a ratio of 100:81, also called a comma-deficient major third.

== Pythagorean tuning ==
The Pythagorean ditone is the major third in Pythagorean tuning, which has an interval ratio of 81:64, which is 407.82 cents. The Pythagorean ditone is evenly divisible by two major tones (9/8 or 203.91 cents) and is wider than a just major third (5/4, 386.31 cents) by a syntonic comma (81/80, 21.51 cents). Because it is a comma wider than a "perfect" major third of 5:4, it is called a "comma-redundant" interval.

"The major third that appears commonly in the [Pythagorean] system (C–E, D–F♯, etc.) is more properly known as the Pythagorean ditone and consists of two major and two minor semitones (2M+2m). This is the interval that is extremely sharp, at 408c (the pure major third is only 386c)."

It may also be thought of as four justly tuned fifths minus two octaves.

The prime factorization of the 81:64 ditone is 3^4/2^6 (or 3/1 * 3/1 * 3/1 * 3/1 * 1/2 * 1/2 * 1/2 * 1/2 * 1/2 * 1/2).

== Just intonation ==
In Didymus's diatonic and Ptolemy's syntonic tunings, the ditone is a just major third with a ratio of 5:4, made up of two unequal tones—a major and a minor tone of 9:8 and 10:9, respectively. The difference between the two systems is that Didymus places the minor tone below the major, whereas Ptolemy does the opposite.

== Meantone temperament ==
In meantone temperaments, the major tone and minor tone are replaced by a "mean tone" which is somewhere in between the two. Two of these tones make a ditone or major third. This major third is exactly the just (5:4) major third in quarter-comma meantone. This is the source of the name: the note exactly halfway between the bounding tones of the major third is called the "mean tone".

== Equal temperament ==
Modern writers occasionally use the word "ditone" to describe the interval of a major third in equal temperament. For example, "In modern acoustics, the equal-tempered semitone has 100 cents, the tone 200 cents, the ditone or major third 400 cents, the perfect fourth 500 cents, and so on. …”

== See also ==
- Tritone
- Tone
- Pythagorean interval
