= Elementa harmonica =

Ancient Greek music theory treatise

Elements of Harmonics
- Author: Aristoxenus
- Original title: Ἁρμονικὰ στοιχεῖα
- Translator: Henry Stewart Macran
- Language: Greek
- Subject: Music theory
- Genre: Treatise
- Published: 4th century BC
- English publication date: 1902

Elementa harmonica (Ἁρμονικὰ στοιχεῖα in Greek; Elements of Harmonics in English) is a treatise on the subject of musical scales by Aristoxenus, of which considerable amounts are extant.

The work dates to the second half of the 4th century BC. It is the oldest substantially surviving work written on the subject of music theory.

== Title ==
The work is generally known as Aristoxenou Harmonika Stoicheia or Elements of Harmonics.

It is also known by the shorter title The Elements, rendering Greek Στοιχεία.

== The Work ==
=== Historical context ===
Aristoxenus's work departs from prior studies in which music was studied only in relation to an understanding of the kosmos. The study of music in the Pythagorean school c.500 had focused on the mathematical nature of harmonia.

Aristotle, whose Peripatetic school Aristoxenus belonged to, addressed the subject in his work On the Soul. Aristoxenus opposed the position of the Pythagoreans; he favoured an intellectual treatment of the subject in Aristotelian terms, i.e. by applying the exercise of inductive logic with attention to empirical evidence.

As such, the Elements is the first and earliest work on music in the classical Greek tradition. Musicology as a discipline comes into being with the systematic study undertaken in the work.

=== Description ===
The work is a theoretical treatise concerned with harmony and harmonics, and thus pertains to a burgeoning theory of euphonics. The study of harmonics is especially concerned with treating melody in order to find its components (the Greek word for melody is μέλος).

In the first sentence of the treatise Aristoxenus identifies Harmony as belonging under the general scope of the study of the science of Melody. Aristoxenus considers notes to fall along a continuum available to auditory perception. Aristoxenus identified the three tetrachords in the treatise as diatonic, the chromatic, and the enharmonic.

Aristoxenus aims to attempt an empirical study based upon observation. As such, his writing contains criticisms of earlier approaches and attitudes, including those of the Pythagorean and harmonikoi, on the problems of sound perceptible as music.

=== Synopsis ===
The work comprises 3 books. Book II seems not to follow from Book I, and it is quite widely but not unanimously assumed that Book I is a separate work from Book II & III.

The parts of harmonics:

(1) The Genera - the ways in which the differences between these are determined

(2) Distantia (Intervals) - the distinction of how these are differentiated

(3) Notes - dynameis

(4) Systēmata - enumerating and distinguishing the types, and explaining how they are put together out of Notes and Intervals

(5) Tonoi (Modes) - including the relations between them

(6) Modulation

(7) Construction / Composition

=== Discussion ===
The use of dynamis (pl. dynameis) as a musical term seems to have been originated by Aristoxenus. The term normally denotes power and potentiality. Sidoli contends in his review (cf. ref.) that the initial use of the concept by Aristoxenus was rather "elusive."

== Later Reception ==
Vitruvius's concepts of architectural and machine design draw heavily on the Elements of Aristoxenus.

The Elements was studied earnestly during the Renaissance by theoreticians and musicians. Renaissance thinkers were faced with a choice between following Pythagoras or Aristoxenus.

== Editions and Translations ==
Antonius Gogavinus translated the book into Latin as Elementa Harmonica in 1564.

Marcus Meibom included Aristoxenus' text in Antiquae musicae auctores septem (1652), his series of Latin translations of Greek music theory.

Paul Marquard translated it into German as Aristoxenou harmonikōn ta sōzomena: Die harmonischen fragmente des Aristoxenus (1868). Rudolf Westphal also created a German edition (Leipzig, 1883).

Henry Stewart Macran was the first to translate Elementa Harmonica into English (Oxford, 1902).

An edition was published in Latin during 1954, and another in the same year in Italian, by Typis Publicae Officinae Polygraphicae.

There is an English translation by Andrew Barker in his Greek Musical Writings (volume 1 published 1984, volume 2 1989).

== Modern Studies ==
- Bélis, Annie, Aristoxene de Tarante et Aristote: Le Traité d’harmonique, Études et commentaires 100 (Paris, 1986).
- Cazden, Norman. "Pythagoras and Aristoxenos Reconciled", Journal of Music Theory 32. 1 (1958), 51–73.
- Huffman, Carl A. Aristoxenus of Tarentum : Discussion. Transaction Publishers, 2012.
- Laloy, Louis. Aristoxène de Tarent et la Musique de l'antiquité (Paris, 1904).
- Landels, John G. Music in Ancient Greece and Rome (London and New York, 1999).
- Litchfield, Malcolm. "Aristoxenus and Empiricism: A Reevaluation Based on His Theories". Journal of Music Theory, Vol. 32, No. 1. (Spring, 1988). Duke University Press: 51–73. doi:10.2307/843385. JSTOR 843385.
- Winnington-Ingram, R.P. "Aristoxenus and the Intervals of Greek Music", Classical Quarterly 26 (1932), 195–208.

== See also ==
- Musical system of ancient Greece § Aristoxenian tonoi
