= Miloš Velimirović =

American musicologist (1922–2008)

- Милош Велимировић
- Born: Miloš Milorad Velimirović; December 10, 1922; Belgrade, Kingdom of Yugoslavia
- Died: April 18, 2008 (aged 85); Bridgewater, Virginia, US
- Citizenship: American (from 1960)
- Spouses: Norma Goodwin (m. 1956; div. 1977); Elizabeth Desportes (m. 1985)
- Children: 2

Academic background
- Education: University of Belgrade; Harvard University

Miloš Milorad Velimirović (Serbian: Милош Милорад Велимировић; December 10, 1922 – April 18, 2008) was an American musicologist. Twice a recipient of a Fulbright fellowship, he was considered an international expert in the areas of Byzantine music, the history of Slavonic music, and the history of Italian opera in the 18th century.

== Early life ==
Velimirović was born on December 10, 1922, in Belgrade, Kingdom of Yugoslavia (present-day Serbia) to Milorad Velimirović, a physician, and Desanka Jovanović, a piano teacher. In his boyhood in Serbia, he learned to play the violin and piano. He learnt several languages, and had a lifelong passion for music. During his adolescent years he studied music history and music theory. Velimirović began a program of studies in music history at the University of Belgrade, also studying violin and piano at the conservatory. In 1941, with the invasion of the Axis powers, the university was closed, and Velimirović's studies there were suspended until after the war.

== Career ==
From 1950 to 1951, Velimirović worked with Harvard University professor Albert Lord in collecting oral epic songs from singers in Yugoslavia. This fieldwork was a follow-up trip to the work done by another Harvard professor of classics, Milman Parry, from 1933 to 1935. Lord himself had assisted Parry in the final stages of that trip. The material gathered in this trip is discussed most prominently in Lord's 1960 book, The Singer of Tales. Albert and Mary Lou Lord sponsored Velimirović's immigration to the United States in 1952, to enter the graduate studies program at Harvard. Velimirović received a master's degree (in 1953) and a doctoral degree (in 1957) from Harvard.

Velimirović was a Junior Fellow in Byzantine Studies at Dumbarton Oaks for the 1955/56 and 1956/57 academic years. From 1957 to 1969, he taught at Yale University. During that time, he was awarded a Fulbright fellowship for research in Greece in the 1963/64 academic year. Beginning in 1969, until 1973, Velimirović was on the faculty of the University of Wisconsin–Madison. He taught at the University of Virginia from 1973 to 1993, serving as chair of the McIntire Department of Music from 1974 to 1978. In 1985, he was awarded a second Fulbright fellowship, to teach abroad in Yugoslavia. Velimirović retired as a Professor Emeritus in 1993.

In 2003, Velimirović was invited to a symposium at the Bolshoi Theatre in Moscow. As a follow-up to this event, his Russian colleagues presented him with a festschrift volume entitled "Византия и Восточная Европа : литургические и музыкальные связи : к 80-летию доктора Милоша Велимировича" (Byzantium and Eastern Europe: Liturgical and Musical Links – In Honor of the 80th Birthday of Dr. Miloš Velimirović). The volume was originally written in Russian and included contributions by authors from nine countries. On October 18, 2004, the National and Capodistrian University of Athens awarded an honorary doctorate to Velimirović.

== Personal life ==
On 21 April 1956, Velimirović married Norma Goodwin in Cambridge, Massachusetts. The couple had 2 children, before later divorcing in 1977. On 28 December 1985, Velimirović married Elizabeth Desportes. Velimirović became American citizen in 1960.

After retirement, he continued to reside in Virginia, until his death in 2008, at the age of 85, in Bridgewater.

== Selected works ==
A more detailed bibliography of Velimirović's works through about 1993 is available in a family history Velimirovići by Gojko Antić. Included in the bibliography are entries documenting translations of Velimirović's writings, primarily into Greek, Serbo-Croatian, and Bulgarian.

=== Books ===
- Byzantine elements in early Slavic Chant: The Hirmologion. Monumenta musicae Byzantinae. Copenhagen: E. Munksgaard. 1960.
- Jack Westrup, ed. (1966). "Byzantine Composers in Ms. Athens 2406". Essays Presented to Egon Wellesz. London & New York: Oxford University Press.
- Studies in Eastern Chant, volumes I–IV. Egon Wellesz and Miloš Velimirović, general editors. Oxford University Press. 1966–1979.
- Laurence Berman, ed. (1972). "The Prooemiac Psalm of Byzantine Vespers". Words and Music: The Scholar's View: A Medley of Problems and Solutions Compiled in Honor of A. Tillman Merritt by Sundry Hands. Cambridge: Harvard University, Department of Music.
- Stanley Sadie, ed. (1980). "Russian and Slavonic Church Music". The New Grove Dictionary of Music and Musicians. London: Macmillan. ISBN 1-56159-174-2.
- Malcolm Hamrick Brown, ed. (1984). "Melodies of the Ninth-Century Kanon for St. Demetrius". Russian and Soviet Music: Essays for Boris Schwarz. Russian Music Series. Ann Arbor: UMI Research Press. ISBN 0-8357-1545-0.
- Richard Crocker; David Hiley, eds. (1990). "Christian Chant in Syria, Armenia, Egypt, and Ethiopia". The New Oxford History of Music: v.2 The Early Middle Ages to 1300 (2nd ed.). Oxford University Press. ISBN 0-19-316329-2.
- Richard Crocker; David Hiley, eds. (1990). "Byzantine Chant". The New Oxford History of Music: v.2 The Early Middle Ages to 1300 (2nd ed.). Oxford University Press. ISBN 0-19-316329-2.
- John J. Yiannias, ed. (1991). "Byzantine Musical Traditions among the Slavs". The Byzantine Tradition after the Fall of Constantinople. Charlottesville, VA: University Press of Virginia. ISBN 0-8139-1329-2.
- William C. Brumfield; Milos M. Velimirovic., eds. (1991). Christianity and the arts in Russia. Cambridge University Press. ISBN 0-521-41310-9.
- John S. Langdon; Stephen W. Reinert; Jelisaveta Stanojevich Allen; Christopher P. Ioannides, eds. (1993). "Reflections on Music and Musicians in Byzantium". ΤΟ ΕΛΛΗΝΙΚΟΝ: Studies in Honor of Speros Vryonis, Jr. New Rochelle, New York: Aristide D. Caratzas. ISBN 0-89241-512-6.
- Alex N. Dragnich, ed. (1994). "Serbia's Cultural Legacy: the Middle Ages". Serbia's Historical Heritage. New York: Columbia University Press. ISBN 0-88033-244-1.
- A. R. Littlewood, ed. (1995). "Originality and Innovation in Byzantine Music". Originality in Byzantine Literature, Art and Music: A Collection of Essays. Oxford: Oxbow Books. ISBN 0-946897-87-5.
- Geoffrey C. Orth, ed. (1995). "The First Organ Builder in Russia". Literary and Musical Notes: a Festschrift for Wm. A Little. Berne: Peter Lang. ISBN 3-906753-89-1.
- Helen Damico with Donald Fennema and Karmen Lenz, ed. (2000). "Egon Wellesz (1885–1974)". Medieval Scholarship: Biographical Studies on the Formation of a Discipline: Volume 3: Philosophy and the Arts. New York & London: Garland Publishing, Inc. ISBN 0-8153-3339-0.
- Peter Jeffery, ed. (2001). "Russian Musical Azbuki: A Turning Point in the History of Slavic Chant". The Study of Medieval Chant: Paths and Bridges, East and West: in Honor of Kenneth Levy. Cambridge: Boydell & Brewer. ISBN 0-85115-800-5.
- Findeizen, Nikolai (January 16, 2008). History of Music in Russia from Antiquity to 1800. Russian Music Studies. Miloš Velimirović and Claudia R. Jensen, editors, translation by Samuel William Pring. Bloomington: Indiana University Press. ISBN 978-0-253-34825-8.

=== Papers ===
- Velimirovic, Milos (1960). "Russian Autographs at Harvard". Notes. Second Series. 17 (4). Music Library Association: 539–558. doi:10.2307/892377. ISSN 0027-4380. JSTOR 892377.
- Velimirović, Miloš; Liszt, Franz (1961). "Lisztiana, with Three Unpublished Letters". The Musical Quarterly. 47 (4). Oxford University Press: 469–480. doi:10.1093/mq/xlvii.4.469. ISSN 0027-4631. JSTOR 740625.
- Velimirovic, Milos M. (1962). "Liturgical Drama in Byzantium and Russia". Dumbarton Oaks Papers. 16. Dumbarton Oaks Papers, Vol. 16: 349–385. doi:10.2307/1291166. JSTOR 1291166.
- Velimirovic, Milos; Rimsky-Korsakov, Nikolay (1962). "An Unpublished Letter from Rimsky-Korsakov". Journal of the American Musicological Society. 15 (3). University of California Press on behalf of the American Musicological Society: 352–353. doi:10.1525/jams.1962.15.3.03a00080. ISSN 0003-0139. JSTOR 829870.
- Velimirovic, Milos (Winter 1962). "Recent Soviet Articles on Music Theory". Journal of Music Theory. 6 (2). Duke University Press on behalf of the Yale University Department of Music: 283–293. doi:10.2307/842913. ISSN 0022-2909. JSTOR 842913.
- Velimirovic, Milos (Summer 1963). ""Early Roots of Russian Opera" Revisited". Journal of the American Musicological Society. 16 (2). University of California Press on behalf of the American Musicological Society: 257–260. doi:10.1525/jams.1963.16.2.03a00100. ISSN 0003-0139. JSTOR 829948.
- "Cristoforo Ivanovich from Budva: the first Historian of the Venetian Opera". Zvuk: 135–45. 1967.
- Velimirović, Miloš (Jul 1968). "H. J. W. Tillyard, Patriarch of Byzantine Studies". The Musical Quarterly. 54 (3). Oxford University Press: 341–351. doi:10.1093/mq/liv.3.341. ISSN 0027-4631. JSTOR 741291.
- Velimirović, Miloš; Velimirovic, Milos (Jan–Jun 1971). "Present Status of Research in Byzantine Music". Acta Musicologica. 43 (1/2). International Musicological Society: 1–20. doi:10.2307/932497. ISSN 0001-6241. JSTOR 932497.
- Velimirović, Miloš; Velimirovic, Milos (Jul–Dec 1972). "The Present Status of Research in Slavic Chant". Acta Musicologica. 44 (2). International Musicological Society: 235–265. doi:10.2307/932170. ISSN 0001-6241. JSTOR 932170.
- Velimirovic, Milos (Autumn 1975). "[Letter from Miloš Velimirović]". Journal of the American Musicological Society. 28 (3). University of California Press on behalf of the American Musicological Society: 567–569. doi:10.1525/jams.1975.28.3.03a00160. ISSN 0003-0139. JSTOR 831331.
- Kenneth E. Naylor, ed. (1976). "Peasant Culture and National Culture: Examples from the Arts". Balkanistica. III. Columbus, OH: Slavica Publishers, Inc. [for the American Association for South Slavic Studies]. ISSN 0360-2206.
- Velimirović, Miloš (Apr 1976). "Egon Wellesz and the Study of Byzantine Chant". The Musical Quarterly. 62 (2). Oxford University Press: 265–277. doi:10.1093/mq/lxii.2.265. ISSN 0027-4631. JSTOR 741340.
- Velimirovic, Milos (Winter 1986). "Changing Interpretations of Music". New Literary History. 17 (2). The Johns Hopkins University Press: 365–380. doi:10.2307/468903. ISSN 0028-6087. JSTOR 468903.
