= Archestratus (music theorist) =

Harmonic theorist of the 3rd century BC

Archestratus (Ancient Greek: Ἀρχέστρατος Archestratos) was a harmonic theorist in the Peripatetic tradition and probably lived in the early 3rd century BC. Little is known of his life and career. Athenaeus' reference (XIV.634d) to an Archestratus who wrote On auletes (Περὶ αὐλητῶν) in two books is perhaps to him; it is a "rather remote" possibility that he is identical with Archestratus of Syracuse.

== Harmonic theory ==
The most substantial evidence for Archestratus' ideas is in a passage of Porphyry's commentary on Ptolemy's Harmonics, pp. 26–27 Düring (the "<>" are from the original):

After supporting what he [Didymus] has said with further evidence, which I shall use more appropriately later, he adds: "And there are others who give a place to both perception and reason, but who assign a certain priority to reason; one of them is Archestratus."

It would be helpful to digress a little and clarify this man's approach, to the extent that it will assist in outlining things that are useful to us now. He declared that there are three notes in all, the barypyknos, the oxypyknos and the amphipyknos. He says that the barypyknos is the one from which one can place a pyknon on the lower side, the oxypyknos, conversely, is that from which one can place a pyknon on the upper side, and the amphipyknos is that which takes the position between them. And each of them is embraced in a single note, since it is possible for it <to occupy> several pitches, and to weave a melody among them while the pitch continues to be of one form, as <it is possible> for both <of the hypatai> and <the> paramesê and all such notes to be oxypyknoi, or so he says.

In this way it turns out that on the one hand he uses sense-perception as a criterion too, since without it the particular items that he adopts would not be apparent, the note, for example, and <the thesis that> there are only three places for it in the pyknon. For this is confirmed through <the proposition that> a pyknon is not placed next to a pyknon either as a whole or in part. The theorem as a whole, however, is put together on the basis of reason (logikôs); for <the proposition that> the forms of the notes are of these sorts is worked out by reason, since they are specific orderings of the relation between the notes. And what one might call the "conclusion" of the theorem – since it is rather sophistic to speak only of the form of a note and thus to leave it as something purely intelligible (noêton) – is obviously based wholly on reason. From this, then, let this approach, too, have been shown.

The pyknon is a structure located within a tetrachord. Despite the forbiddingly technical and "arid" appearance of the doctrines ascribed to Archestratus, Andrew Barker has argued that in fact "they engage with issues of real significance to musicians, and to anyone seeking to understand the resources and strategies of melodic composition."

== Connections with philosophy ==
The final section of the passage cited from Porphyry suggests that Archestratus was interested in philosophical topics including definition, matter and form and "the relative importance of the faculties of sense-perception and reason in musical analysis," a topic that had been debated by Plato (Rep. 530c–531c) and Aristoxenus (with whom Archestratus seems to have been in broad sympathy).

Archestratus' claim that his work "had substantial connections with philosophy" earned him a vicious attack in Philodemus' De musica, since Diogenes of Babylon, Philodemus' chief antagonist in that work, had used Archestratus' ideas in support of his own. Philodemus' report is as follows (De musica, Book 4 col. 137.13–27 in the Budé edition of D. Delattre = pp. 91–92 Kemke):

Archestratus and his followers, who say that the parts of musical studies concerned with the nature of the voice, the note, the interval and other such things are philosophical matters, are people who should not be tolerated, not only because they have set out on utterly irrelevant theorising, and have babbled about these things childishly in a way that is useless to the science, but also because they are the only people to have declared that the study of these matters is mousikê.

Archestratus may have hoped to show that specialized sciences such as harmonics were entitled to the serious attention of philosophers in general, but the schools of Hellenistic philosophy were largely immune to this suggestion.

== Sources ==
- Barker, Andrew (2009). "Musical Theory and Philosophy: The Case of Archestratus". Phronesis. 54 (4/5): 390–422. doi:10.1163/003188609X12486562883255. JSTOR 40387997.
