= Paul Marquard =

German philologist

Paul Marquard (8 October 1836 – 7 December 1872) was a German classical philologist and music historian.

== Life ==
Born in Drezdenko, Marquard, the son of pastor Friedrich Rudolf Marquard (ca. 1801-1853) and Auguste née Müller, received his first lessons from his father and then attended the Joachimsthalsches Gymnasium in Berlin. After the early death of his father, his teachers there became important reference persons for him. In the vita of his dissertation, he later mentioned above all the director August Meineke, the teacher Karl Pomptow (1819-1879) and his fellow pupil Adolf Kiessling (1837-1893), who supported him during his studies. After graduating from high school (1857), Marquard studied classical philology, philosophy and theology, first at the Humboldt University of Berlin, then, from the winter semester 1857/1858, at the Rheinische Friedrich-Wilhelms-Universität Bonn with Otto Jahn, Friedrich Ritschl and Friedrich Gottlieb Welcker. After the state examination, he taught first at the Bender'sche Erziehungsanstalt für Knaben in Weinheim, then at the Instituut Noorthey (founded by Petrus de Raadt) in Veur (Leidschendam-Voorburg, Netherlands). In 1863, Marquard received his doctorate in Bonn. His fellow students Anton Klette, Curt Wachsmuth and Lucian Müller were his competitors.

From 1865, Marquard taught at the Friedrichswerdersches Gymnasium in Berlin, where he was appointed a full teacher. During this time, he continued his scientific work, which was mainly concerned with ancient music theory. He undertook research trips to various libraries to study the manuscripts of the Greek music theorists. In 1868, his annotated, bilingual edition of the Harmonics of Aristoxenos was published, which remained fundamental long after its publication. Together with Hermann Deiters and Karl von Jan, Marquard planned a complete edition of the ancient music theorists, but this did not come about.

For health reasons Marquard retired on 1 October 1872. For recreation and further scientific work he travelled to Italy. On 7 December 1872, he died at the age of 36 years in Catania in Sicily.

== Publications ==
- De Aristoxeni Tarentini elementis harmonicis. Bonn 1863 (Dissertation)
- Ἀριστοξένου ἁρμονικῶν τὰ σωζόμενα. Die harmonischen Fragmente des Aristoxenus. Griechisch und deutsch mit kritischem und exegetischem Commentar und einem Anhang die rhythmischen Fragmente des Aristoxenus enthaltend. Berlin 1868
- Briefe über Berliner Erziehung. Berlin 1871
- Briefe über nationale Erziehung. Leipzig 1872
