= John Oulton Wisdom =

Irish philosopher

J. O. Wisdom
- Wisdom pictured in 1928 after coming second in the Irish Amateur Close golfing championship
- Born: John Oulton Wisdom; 29 December 1908; Dublin, Ireland
- Died: 30 January 1993 (aged 84); Castlebridge, County Wexford, Ireland

John Oulton Wisdom (29 December 1908 – 30 January 1993), cousin of Cambridge professor John Wisdom (with whom he is sometimes confused), was an Irish philosopher. He was "an important contributor to philosophy and to psychoanalysis" who made "original contributions to the mind-body problem, to philosophy of science, to cybernetics, to the theory of psychosomatic disorder, and to psychoanalytic theory".

== Life ==
Born in Dublin on 29 December 1908, J. O. Wisdom (as he was often cited) was the only child of Thomas Hume Wisdom, a brewery clerk, and his English-born wife Jane Oulton.

He was educated at Earlsfort House School, also attended by Samuel Beckett, and then at Trinity College Dublin, where he studied under the Hegelian scholar Henry Stewart Macran. Graduating in 1931, he continued postgraduate studies until 1933 when he received a doctoral degree for a thesis on Hegel. While an undergraduate, he was made a scholar in mathematics.

Wisdom was then to move to Cambridge where he encountered the analytic philosophy of G. E. Moore and Ludwig Wittgenstein. His first teaching post was in Cairo, where he published The Metamorphosis of Philosophy in 1947. In 1948 he was appointed as a lecturer at the London School of Economics, (where he would meet with Karl Popper) before being appointed as a Reader in 1953, a position he retained until 1965. Wisdom also served as an editor of the British Journal for the Philosophy of Science from 1952 until 1963. In the mid-sixties Wisdom would move to North America, teaching at several US universities before finally moving to Canada and to a professorship in philosophy and social science at York University, Toronto, where he remained until his retirement in 1979.

He died at his home, Wilmont House, in Castlebridge, County Wexford, in 1993.

== Works ==
- Causation and the Foundations of Science (Paris, 1946).
- The Metamorphosis of Philosophy (Cairo, 1947).
- Foundations of Inference in Natural Science (1952).
- The Unconscious Origin of Berkeley's Philosophy (1953).
- Philosophy and its Place in our Culture (1975).
- Challengeability in Modern Science (1987)
- Philosophy of the Social Sciences.
  - vol. i: A metascientific introduction and vol. ii: Schemata (1987), vol. iii: Groundwork for social dynamics (1993)
- Freud, Women, and Society (New Brunswick, 1992).

For complete bibliographical details see "Publications by John Oulton Wisdom" (1993).
