= Karl von Jan =

German philologist

Karl von Jan (22 May 1836 – 3 September 1899) was a German classical philologist and musicologist.

== Life ==
Born in Schweinfurt, Jan, the eldest son of the classical philologist and grammar school headmaster Ludwig von Jan (1807–1869), turned to the special field of ancient music already during his studies. During his studies he became a member of the Christian student fraternity of C. St. V. Uttenruthia Erlangen in the winter semester 1853/54. He received his doctorate in 1859 at the Humboldt University of Berlin with the dissertation De fidibus graecorum ("On the Stringed Instruments of the Greeks"). Jan received his first teaching position at the Berlinisches Gymnasium zum Grauen Kloster, whose headmaster Johann Friedrich Bellermann was also concerned with the music of ancient Greece. During the short time of their collaboration, Jan received numerous suggestions from Bellermann. In 1862, he moved to the Gymnasium in Landsberg an der Warthe, where he took over not only the Old Languages but also singing lessons and the school orchestra, and performed concerts with which he financed the school's new organ. Because of disagreements with the Landsberg town council, Jan moved to Saargemünd in 1875, where he also conducted the school choir. In 1883, he was appointed professor at the Lyceum in Strasbourg.

Jan died in Adelboden at the age of 63.

== Achievements ==
Jan was one of the most important researchers in the field of ancient Greek music. He belonged to a generation of researchers who raised the still young science of musicology from mere aestheticization "to a real science on a par with other disciplines". In his writings, he dealt with the function and playing technique of ancient stringed and wind instruments. He found, for example, that the sound of an aulos does not resemble that of a flute, as the common translation suggests, but rather that of a clarinet.

Jan followed with great interest the new papyrus finds in the 1990s of the 19th century. He took an active part in the critical publication and order of the fragments. His large edition Musici scriptores Graeci (Leipzig 1895) collected the fragments with text-critical annotations, without attempting to edit them for modern performances. Jan also gave examples of how to translate them into modern music notation, which he published in a new edition in 1899. The work, accompanied by numerous preliminary studies, was reprinted unchanged in 1962 and 1995 and is considered Jan's most important publication, as it replaces the long outdated Antiquae musicae auctores septem by Marcus Meibom (1652).

Jan also got involved in the research debate on the harmonics of kithara music and stood up to the predominant expert in this field, Rudolf Westphal. Westphal's speculations about possible harmonic laws were largely rejected by Jan and he argued that one should limit oneself to what is certainly recognizable in the ancient theory of harmony. After his death, the positions of both researchers were abandoned.

In addition to ancient music, Jan was also interested in medieval and early modern music, especially Jean-Jacques Rousseau and Heinrich Schütz.

He was awarded the Order of the Red Eagle, 4th class.
