= David Hiley =

English musicologist (born 1947)

- Born: 5 September 1947 (age 79); Littleborough, Greater Manchester, England
- Occupation: Musicologist
- Known for: Scholarship on plainchant

Academic background
- Education: Magdalen College; King's College London

Academic work
- Discipline: Early music
- Institutions: University of Regensburg; Royal Holloway; Eton College

David Hiley (born 5 September 1947) is an English musicologist. He specializes in early music, particularly plainchant, early polyphony and English music.

== Life and career ==
David Hiley was born in Littleborough, Greater Manchester, England on 5 September 1947. He studied with Bernard Rose and David Wulstan at Magdalen College (BA 1968), and with Ian Bent and Howard Mayer Brown at King's College London (PhD 1981), with a doctorate on the sacred music of Norman Sicily. After posts at Eton College (assistant music master; 1968–73) and Royal Holloway College, University of London (lecturer; 1976–86), he joined the University of Regensburg as a professor of musicology, where he has been since 1986.

Hiley specializes in early music, particularly plainchant, early polyphony and English music. His publications include two book-length surveys of plainchant, Western Plainchant (1993) and Gregorian Chant (2009).

Among his memberships are as honorary vice-president of the Plainsong and Medieval Music Society (PMMS; 1996); member of Academia Europaea (1998); and corresponding member of the American Musicological Society (2002). From 1978 to 1990 he edited the PMMS' Plainsong and Medieval Music journal.

== Selected bibliography ==
=== Books ===
- Richard, Crocker; David, Hiley, eds. (1990). The New Oxford History of Music. Vol. II: The Early Middle Ages To 1300 (2nd ed.). Oxford: Oxford University Press. ISBN 978-0-19-316329-4.
- Hiley, David (1993). Western Plainchant: A Handbook. Oxford: Clarendon Press. ISBN 978-0-19-816289-6.
- —— (2009). Gregorian Chant. Cambridge: Cambridge University Press. ISBN 978-0-521-69035-5.

=== Articles ===
- Hiley, David (May 1998). "Recent Research on the Origins of Western Chant". Early Music. 16 (2): 202–213. JSTOR 3127192.
- —— (1997). "Writings on Western Plainchant in the 1980s and 1990s". Acta Musicologica. 69 (Fasc. 1): 53–93. doi:10.2307/932802. JSTOR 932802.
- —— (2001). "Plainsong and Mediaeval Music Society". Grove Music Online. Oxford: Oxford University Press. doi:10.1093/gmo/9781561592630.article.21895. ISBN 978-1-56159-263-0. (subscription, Wikilibrary access, or UK public library membership required)
- —— (2001). "Notker". Grove Music Online. Oxford: Oxford University Press. doi:10.1093/gmo/9781561592630.article.20128. ISBN 978-1-56159-263-0. (subscription, Wikilibrary access, or UK public library membership required)
- —— (2016) [2004]. "Notker Balbulus". MGG Online (in German). Kassel: Bärenreiter. (subscription required)
