= Henry Stewart Macran =

Irish philosopher (1867–1937)

Henry Stewart Macran (1867–1937) was an Irish philosopher and internationally recognized scholar of Hegel's philosophy at Trinity College Dublin.

== Life and works ==
Macran was an undergraduate during 1882–1886, he became a fellow in 1892 and subsequently professor of moral philosophy (1901–1934) and history of philosophy (1934–1937) at Trinity College Dublin. He was also Trinity College's senior dean from 1931 to 1935 and from 1936 to 1937. In 1941 a Henry Stewart Macran Prize was named in his memory, for graduate students who write the best examination on Hegel's system of philosophy and an essay ‘on a subject of a metaphysical or ethical and not merely psychological or logical character’.

Macran provided the first translation of Aristoxenus's Elementa harmonica into English (Oxford, 1902).

== Publications ==
- Aristoxenus; Macran, Henry Stewart (1902). The harmonics of Aristonexus. Snell Library Northeastern University. Oxford: At the Clarendon Press.
- Hegel, Georg Wilhelm Friedrich; Macran, Henry Stewart (1912). Doctrine of formal logic, being a translation of the first section of the subjunctive logic;. Robarts - University of Toronto. Oxford, Clarendon Press.
- Hegel, Georg Wilhelm Friedrich; Macran, Henry Stewart (1929). Hegel's logic of world and idea: being a translation of the second and third parts of the Subjective logic. Subjektive Logik.Pt. 2-3English. Oxford: Clarendon Press.
