= Lamprus of Erythrae =

Lamprus of Erythrae or Lamprus of Athens (Ancient Greek: Λάμπρος) was an ancient Greek musician with excellent skill at the playing of the lyre.

== Life ==
Lamprus was born in Athens, alive in the early part of the fifth century B.C.E., and taught music to Sophocles according to some. He was a teacher of the lyre and dance.

A teacher named Lamprus, sometime before 343 B.C.E, while in Mantineia, is held to have taught Aristoxenus. However, the fifth-century Lamprus would not have survived long enough to be the teacher of Aristoxenus, so that "Either this is a Lamprus of whom we know nothing else, or the reference has been added to the biographical tradition in order to emphasize Aristoxenus' connection with traditional ancient Greek music as opposed to the "New Music" of the late fifth and fourth centuries.

Lamprus was noted for his sober lifestyle, choosing to drink water instead of wine; Phrynichus said of him, "that the gulls lamented, when Lamprus died among them, being a man who was a water-drinker, a subtle hypersophist, a dry skeleton of the Muses, a nightmare to nightingales, a hymn to hell."

== Music ==
The music of Lamprus is considered restrained, indicating a sober temperament, rather than wild and realistic.

Plato's Socrates recognizes Lamprus as a great music teacher, although placing him below his own teacher, Connus son of Metrobius (Menexenus 236a). Lamprus was also praised by Cornelius Nepos. Pseudo-Plutarch's De Musica 1142b "quotes Aristoxenus as including Lamprus among lyric composers who composed good songs." Lamprus, the "most distinguished musician of his day," was a famous composer in Sophocles' day and was considered by some as perhaps the greatest musician of his time.
