= Peter Westergaard's tonal theory =

Peter Westergaard's tonal theory is the theory of tonal music developed by Peter Westergaard and outlined in Westergaard's 1975 book An Introduction to Tonal Theory (hereafter referred to as ITT). Based on ideas of Heinrich Schenker, Westergaard's theory is notable for:

- explicit treatment of the relationship between rhythmic structures and pitch structures in tonal music
- elimination of "harmony" as a conceptually independent element of musical structure. (Note: In Westergaard's theory, traditional "harmonic" principles follow as by-products, or epiphenomena, of more fundamental contrapuntal principles, so that discussion of chord progressions as such becomes superfluous.)

== Methodological foundations ==
In keeping with Westergaard's characteristic "concern with fundamental methodological questions", ITT begins with a discussion of what it is that a theory of tonal music consists of. The conclusion reached is that it is a "logical framework in terms of which we understand tonal music"–the operative words being "we understand". Westergaard is thus seeking a theory about a certain kind of cognition, as opposed to one dealing with acoustics or neurophysiology. The argument he gives for defining the domain of inquiry in this way is essentially the following: on the one hand, the acoustics of music are already well understood, and in any case acoustical theories are of limited use in addressing the psychological aspects of the musical experience; on the other hand, while neuroscience may eventually be capable of addressing these latter aspects, it is not currently equipped to do so—a situation which is unlikely to change in the near future. Consequently, our best strategy is to address the psychological questions directly, more or less at the level of introspection.

Such an approach, however, immediately raises the problem of developing a metalanguage for discussing tonal music: how do we accurately describe "what we hear"? Reasoning that the process of solving this problem will itself lead inevitably to substantive insights into how music is actually heard, Westergaard takes the construction of a metalanguage for tonal music as his task for the main part of the book.

== Outline of the theory ==
Music is conceived of as consisting of discrete atoms called notes. By definition, these are (conceptual) units of sound that possess the following five attributes: pitch, onset time, duration, loudness, and timbre. The core of Westergaardian theory consists of the following two claims about notes:

1. Starting from a specific type of primitive structure (a diatonic collection with an associated "tonic" triad; see below), we can generate all the notes of any tonal piece by successive application of a small set of operations.
2. The successive stages in the generation process show how we understand the notes in terms of each other.

=== Generative operations ===
Every note is associated both with a particular pitch and a particular time-span (the interval of time between the moment when the note begins and the moment when it ends). Westergaardian operations on notes may be described as composite in nature: they consist of operations on time-spans, onto which operations on pitches are superimposed. (One can think of the time-span operations as accommodating the pitch operations.)

In accordance with the second fundamental claim of Westergaard's theory (see above), applying the operations to given notes should produce other notes that are understood by the listener as being derived from the given notes. One is thus obliged to deal with the question of structural ambiguity: by what means can the composer ensure that the listener understands the particular subordination relations that were intended? Describing potentially ambiguous situations, and the means of resolving them, is one of the major themes of Westergaardian theory, and this preoccupation is evident throughout ITT.

==== Operations on rhythm ====
===== Segmentation =====
A time-span may be divided into smaller time-spans:

===== Delay =====
The onset time of a note may be delayed to a later time-point:

===== Anticipation =====
A note may be anticipated by another note whose time-span is conceptually subordinate to that of the original note:

==== Operations on pitch ====
===== Rearticulation =====
A note in a line may be split into a sequence of successive notes such that:

1. the durations of all of the notes together equal the duration of the original note;
2. all of the notes have the same pitch as the original note; and
3. the first note begins at the same moment in time the original note began.

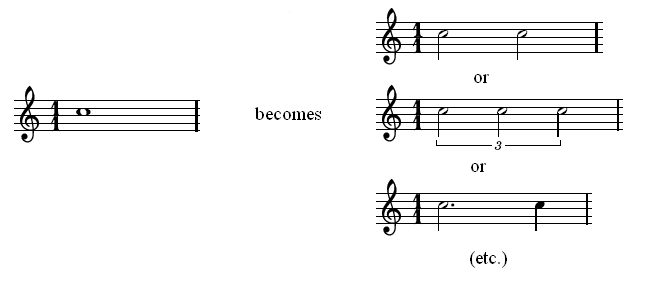

This process (along with its result) is called rearticulation. Although repeated notes may result from an anticipatory structure as well as one derived by segmentation, Westergaard does not use the term "anticipatory rearticulation", preferring instead to simply call such structures "anticipations".

===== Neighbors =====
A neighbor structure is constructed from a rearticulation by:

1. dividing the time-span of the first note into two segments, and
2. inserting, in the second segment, a note whose pitch is an adjacent member of the appropriate diatonic collection (while leaving a note of the original pitch to occupy the first segment).

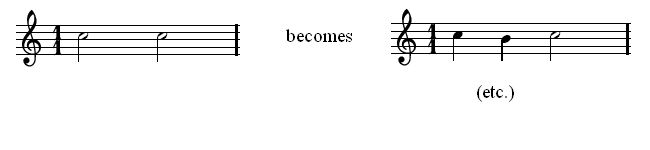

The new note is referred to as a neighbor of the original two. Unlike the ordinary use of the word "neighbor", this relationship is not reciprocal.

Incomplete neighbors may be used to anticipate or delay a note:

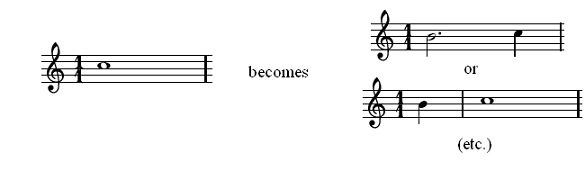

===== Borrowing/arpeggiation =====
A note may be borrowed from another (conceptual) line:

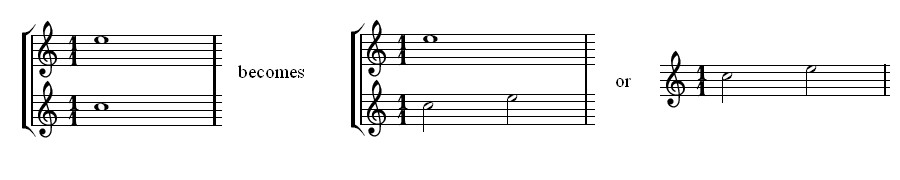

The borrowed note need only be a member of the same pitch class as the source; it does not have to be in the same octave:

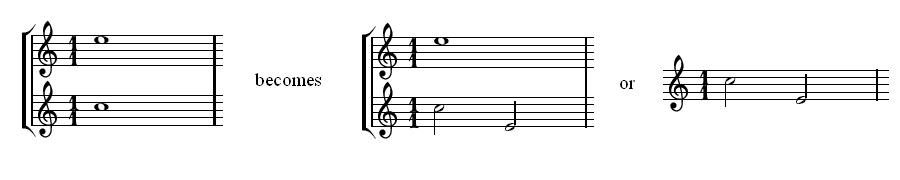

Borrowings may of course be anticipatory:

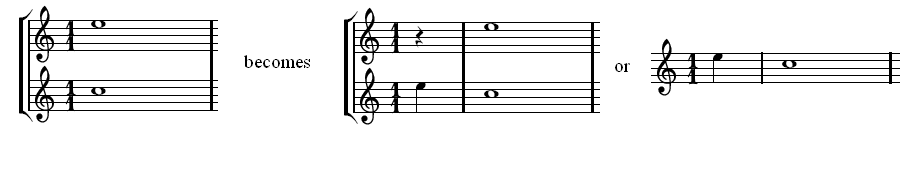

N.B.: It is largely this operation which replaces harmony in Westergaardian theory.

== Species Counterpoint ==
4th chapter of ITT is devoted to species counterpoint, an old western tradition of composing music consisting of simple lines with uniform rhythm. Westergaard presented formal grammars to construct/parse species lines. According to him, there are three types of lines: primary line, generic line, and the bass line. Their base structures (called A-rules in ITT) are different, but the elaborative rules (called B-rules in ITT) are almost the same for each. Here you can find the details of the rules.

=== An analysis of the primary line ===
In this section we would like to explore which lines are parsable as primary lines. Let T denote a tonic-triad pitch and N denote a non-tonic-triad pitch. Let 1,2,3.. denote diatonic degrees where 1 is the tonic. The base structure is one of the 321, 54321, 87654321. For our purposes here, we can take the base structure to be 321 since others can be constructed from it using elaborative rules. We can also discard the T-repetition rule since it's redundant. So we have three elaborative rules:

1. Neighbor rule that inserts a neighbor between two identical pitches,
2. Skip joining rule that inserts all the diatonic degrees between the first and last note that form a skip (an interval larger than a whole tone),
3. T-insertion rule that inserts a T pitch anywhere in the line except after the last pitch, provided that no dissonant skip or no skip larger than an octave occurs.

Here are some useful facts:

1. An N pitch cannot repeat. The base structure 321 does not contain a repeating pitch, and the only rule that can produce a repeat is T-insertion rule.
2. Neighbor rule always produces an N between two Ts. That is, a neighbor construct is always a TNT. To prove this, consider the other possibilities: TTT, NNN, NTN. The TTT is impossible since a neighbor of any T is an N. The other two options are impossible either because we already proved that an N pitch cannot repeat.
3. A line can never have NNN. Furthermore, any NN must be 6th and 7th degrees that are constructible with skip joining of the Ts that must surround them. To see this, notice that we proved that neighbor rule cannot produce an NN. The only other rule capable of producing N is the skip join rule. The only place the skip join rule produces an NN is 6th and 7th diatonic degrees.
4. For any TN or NT that forms a skip, the T must have been spawned with a T-insertion rule, since the other two rules cannot create a skip.
5. A line always starts and ends with a T. Because both neighbor and skip join rules insert notes between existing notes and we start with TNT.

In the light of these observations, here is a linear time parsing algorithm. It omits checking the special cases of 6th and 7th degrees in minor tonality, but it would not be a major problem to integrate this check too.

=== Parsing Algorithm ===
Given a primary line L:

Define the last note to be the tonic. If there is no N in L, reject.

1. If there is no N left, parse all the remaining as T-insertions and halt the program. Otherwise, take the first occurrence of N note in L. If it is first or last note of L, reject. Else, let X,Y be its left and right neighbor notes, respectively.
  - If X and Y are both N notes, reject.
  - If one of X,Y is T and the other is N, take the NN. Check if together with its surrounding it is one of 5678 or 8765. If so, remove the NN to undo the skip join, else reject.
  - If X=Y=T, then we have a TNT.
    - if TN or NT forms a leap, take a T causing the leap. If it has a prohibited leap (dissonant or too large) with one of its neighbors, reject. Else, remove the T to undo the T-insertion rule.
    - Else, the TNT can be viewed either as a neighbor struct or as a skip joining. In both cases, remove the middle N to undo the operation.
2. Go to step 1.

Notice that the algorithm focuses on Ns from left to right, an arbitrary choice of order. Other orders may output different parses. Is it possible for certain orders to produce a parse while others rejecting the input? Put it this way, can we prove that a line L is parsable iff our algorithm parses it? We leave this question open.
