= Didymus the Musician =

Didymus the Musician (Greek: Δίδυμος) was a music theorist in Rome of the end of the 1st century BC or beginning of the 1st century AD, who combined elements of earlier theoretical approaches with an appreciation of the aspect of performance. Formerly assumed to be identical with the Alexandrian grammarian and lexicographer Didymus Chalcenterus, because Ptolemy and Porphyry referred to him as Didymus ho mousikos (the musician), classical scholars now believe that this Didymus was a younger grammarian and musician working in Rome at the time of Emperor Nero. He was a predecessor of Ptolemy at the library of Alexandria. According to Andrew Barker, his intention was to revive and produce contemporary performances of the music of Greek antiquity. The syntonic comma of 81 / 80 ≅ 21.506 cents is sometimes called the comma of Didymus after him.

Among his works was On the Difference between the Aristoxenians and the Pythagoreans (Περὶ τῆς διαφορᾶς τῶν Ἀριστοξενείων τε καὶ Πυθαγορείων).

== Theory ==
We know of his theory only indirectly from the works of Porphyry and Ptolemy. There, one finds examples of his tetrachords as measured string lengths from which the following frequency ratios are calculated:

| tetrachord type | interval 1st–2nd | interval 2nd–3rd | interval 3rd–4th |
|---|---|---|---|
| diatonic | 16 / 15 | 10 / 9 | 9 / 8 |
| chromatic | 16 / 15 | 25 / 24 | 6 / 5 |
| enharmonic | 32 / 31 | 31 / 30 | 5 / 4 |

Like Archytas, he used a major third, but appears to have been the first to use it in the diatonic as the product of the major (9:8) and minor (10:9) whole tones, as the proportions produced by 10 / 9 × 9 / 8 = 5 / 4 . The ratio of these whole tones 9 / 8 ⧸ 10 / 9 = 9 / 8 × 9 / 10 = 81 / 80 ; is the so-called syntonic comma, also referred to as Didymos' comma.

== Sources ==
- Barker, A. (1994). "Greek musicologists in the Roman Empire". Apeiron. 27 (4): 53–74. doi:10.1515/apeiron.1994.27.4.53. ISSN 2156-7093. OCLC 8306313368. S2CID 170415282.
- Chappell, W. (1874). "The History of Music (art and science)". London, UK: Chappell & Co – via HathiTrust Digital Library.
- Hubbard, W.L., ed. (1910). The American History and Encyclopedia of Music. Vol. 10 (reprint ed.). New York, NY: Irving Squire. ISBN 1-4179-0200-0. OCLC 1194188882.
- Katz, R.; Dahlhaus, C. (1987). Contemplating Music: Source readings in the aesthetics of music. Pendragon. p. 30. ISBN 9780918728609.
- Richter, Lukas (1995) [1980]. "Didymus [Didymos ho mousikos]". In Sadie, S.; Grove, G. (eds.). The New Grove Dictionary of Music and Musicians. London, UK: Oxford University Press. pp. 462–463. doi:10.1093/gmo/9781561592630.article.07752. ISBN 0-333-23111-2. OCLC 1245646411 – via Internet Archive (archive.org).
