= Ptolemais of Cyrene =

Ancient music theorist

Ptolemais of Cyrene (Ancient Greek: Πτολεμαῒς ἡ Κυρηναία) was a music theorist, author of Pythagorean Principles of Music (Πυθαγορικὴ τῆς μουσικῆς στοιχείωσις). She lived perhaps in the 3rd century BC, and "certainly not after the first century AD." She is the only known female music theorist of antiquity.

== Life ==
Almost nothing is known about her life; her work is known only from references in Porphyry's commentary on Ptolemy's Harmonics. She shares the same place of origin (Cyrene, Libya) as Arete of Cyrene (a female philosopher of the Cyrenaic school, whose doctrines included Pythagorean elements) and Eratosthenes (whose many interests included music theory). She is one of several women writers associated with Pythagoreanism.

== Work ==
In her work, written in the form of a catechism, she commented on the music-theoretical debate concerning the proper roles of reason and sensory experience in the study of music. Despite her apparent adherence to Pythagoreanism, a school whose theorists (the canonici) put music on a rational and mathematical basis, there is no apparent hostility in her citations of the empiricist followers of Aristoxenus (the musici); perhaps the methodological division was not a stark absolute during her period or from her point of view. Ptolemais also makes reference to musicologists who gave equal importance to perception and reason, preferring to see Aristoxenus himself (as opposed to his followers) in this light, and even stressing the compatible role of perception in the Pythagorean theory:

What is the distinction between those who preferred a combination of both [reason and perception]? While some adopted both perception and reason in the same way, as being of equal importance, others took one as the leader and the other as a follower. Aristoxenus of Tarentum adopted them both in the same way. For neither can what is perceived be composed by itself without reason, nor is reason strong enough to establish something if it does not take its starting points from perception, and the conclusion of the theorising does not agree again with the perception.

In what way does he want perception to be in advance of theory? In order, but not in importance. For he says when what is perceptible whatever it is, is grasped, then we must promote reason for the theoretical study of it.

Who treats both together? Pythagoras and his successors. For they want to adopt perception as a guide for reason at the beginning, as if to provide a spark for it, but to treat reason, when it has started off from such a beginning, as separating from perception and working by itself. So if the composite whole is found in a study by reason to be no longer in accord with perception, they do not turn back, but make their own accusations, saying that the perception is mistaken, and that reason by itself finds what is correct and refutes perception.

In this same passage, Ptolemais criticizes the extreme partisans of both schools, "the Pythagoreans who enjoyed disputing with the musici" for dismissing perception entirely (despite their contradictory "adoption of something perceivable in the beginning"), and "some of the musici who follow Aristoxenus" for adopting their master's "theory based upon thought" but proceeding "through expertise on musical instruments" and "regard[ing] perception as authoritative, and reason as accompanying it, and for necessity only."
