= Tonality =

Harmonic structure with a central pitch

Perfect authentic cadence (IV–V–I chord progression depicting the chords F major, G major, and then C major, in four-part harmony) in C major.
"Tonal music is built around these tonic and dominant arrival points [cadences], and they form one of the fundamental building blocks of musical structure".

In music theory, the tonality of a piece is its perceived key or mode. (Note: "Tonal music is music that is unified and dimensional. Music is 'unified' if it is exhaustively referable to a pre-compositional system generated by a single constructive principle derived from a basic scale-type; it is 'dimensional' if it can nonetheless be distinguished from that pre-compositional ordering".) Tonality centers around a tonic note and chord, where the piece is most stable, and may be indicated by clues such as a key signature or the function of the piece's chords. For example, in the key of C major, the tonic note is C, and the tonic triad is C major (consisting of notes C, E and G). Similarly, in B Lydian, the tonic note is B, and the tonic triad is B major (consisting of notes B, D# and F#).

Simple folk songs, orchestral pieces, and pop songs often start and end with the tonic note. In such pieces, cadences in which the dominant chord or dominant seventh chord resolves to the tonic chord often play an important role in establishing tonality. Harmony in jazz similarly includes certain tonal characteristics of the European common practice period (colloquially known as "classical music"), although not all. (Note: See, for example, quartal and quintal harmony.) Modernistic music, by contrast, was often atonal.

== Etymology ==
The term tonalité originated with Alexandre-Étienne Choron and was borrowed by François-Joseph Fétis in 1840. According to Carl Dahlhaus, however, the term tonalité was only coined by Castil-Blaze in 1821. Although Fétis used it as a general term for a system of musical organization and spoke of types de tonalités rather than a single system, today the term is most often used to refer to major–minor tonality, the system of musical organization of the common practice period. Major–minor tonality is also called harmonic tonality (in the title of Carl Dahlhaus, translating the German harmonische Tonalität), diatonic tonality, common practice tonality, functional tonality, or just tonality.

== Characteristics and features ==
At least eight distinct senses of the word "tonality" (and corresponding adjective, "tonal"), some mutually exclusive, have been identified.

=== Systematic organization ===
The word tonality may describe any systematic organization of pitch phenomena in any music at all, including pre-17th century western music as well as much non-western music, such as music based on the slendro and pelog pitch collections of Indonesian gamelan, or employing the modal nuclei of the Arabic maqam or the Indian raga system.

This sense also applies to the tonic/dominant/subdominant harmonic constellations in the theories of Jean-Philippe Rameau as well as the 144 basic transformations of twelve-tone technique. By the middle of the 20th century, it had become "evident that triadic structure does not necessarily generate a tone center, that non-triadic harmonic formations may be made to function as referential elements, and that the assumption of a twelve-tone complex does not preclude the existence of tone centers".

For the composer and theorist George Perle, tonality is not "a matter of 'tone-centeredness', whether based on a 'natural' hierarchy of pitches derived from the overtone series or an 'artificial' pre compositional ordering of the pitch material; nor is it essentially connected to the kinds of pitch structures one finds in traditional diatonic music". This sense (like some of the others) is susceptible to ideological employment, as Schoenberg, did by relying on the idea of a progressive development in musical resources "to compress divergent fin-de-siècle compositional practices into a single historical lineage in which his own music brings one historical era to a close and begins the next." From this point of view, twelve-tone music could be regarded "either as the natural and inevitable culmination of an organic motivic process (Webern) or as a historical Aufhebung (Adorno), the dialectical synthesis of late Romantic motivic practice on the one hand with a musical sublimation of tonality as pure system on the other".

=== Theoretical arrangement of pitches ===
In another sense, tonality means any rational and self-contained theoretical arrangement of musical pitches, existing prior to any concrete embodiment in music.

For example, "Sainsbury, who had Choron translated into English in 1825, rendered the first occurrence of tonalité as a 'system of modes' before matching it with the neologism 'tonality'. While tonality qua system constitutes a theoretical (and thus imaginative) abstraction from actual music, it is often hypostatized in musicological discourse, converted from a theoretical structure into a musical reality. In this sense, it is understood as a Platonic form or prediscursive musical essence that suffuses music with intelligible sense, which exists before its concrete embodiment in music, and can thus be theorized and discussed apart from actual musical contexts".

=== Contrast with modal and atonal systems ===
To contrast with "modal" and "atonal", the term tonality is used to imply that tonal music is discontinuous as a form of cultural expression from modal music (before 1600) on the one hand and atonal music (after 1910) on the other.

=== Pre-modern concept ===
In some literature, tonality is a generic term applied to pre-modern music, referring to the eight modes of the Western church, implying that important historical continuities underlie music before and after the emergence of the common practice period around 1600, with the difference between tonalité ancienne (before 1600) and tonalité moderne (after 1600) being one of emphasis rather than of kind.

=== Referential tonic ===
In a general way, tonality can refer to a wide variety of musical phenomena (harmonies, cadential formulae, harmonic progressions, melodic gestures, formal categories) as arranged or understood in relation to a referential tonic.

=== Tonal theories ===
In a slightly different sense to the one above, tonality can also be used to refer to musical phenomena perceived or pre-interpreted in terms of the categories of tonal theories.

This is a psychophysical sense, where for example "listeners tend to hear a given pitch as, for instance, an A above middle C, an augmented 4th above E^{♭}, the minor 3rd in an F♯ minor triad, a dominant in relation to D, or (where the caret designates a scale degree) in G major rather than a mere acoustical frequency, in this case 440 Hz".

=== Synonym for "key" ===
The word tonality is sometimes used as a synonym for "key", as in "the C-minor tonality of Beethoven's Fifth Symphony".

In some languages, indeed, the word for "key" and that for "tonality" are the same, e.g. French tonalité.

=== Other perspectives ===
There is a loose assortment of ideas associated with the term.

"Tonal harmonies must always include the third of the chord".

In major and minor harmonies, the perfect fifth is often implied and understood by the listener even if it is not present. To function as a tonic, a chord must be either a major or a minor triad. Dominant function requires a major-quality triad with a root a perfect fifth above the affiliated tonic and containing the leading tone of the key. This dominant triad must be preceded by a chord progression that establishes the dominant as the penultimate goal of a motion that is completed by moving on to the tonic. In this final dominant-to-tonic progression, the leading tone normally ascends by semitone motion to the tonic scale degree. A dominant seventh chord always consist of a major triad with an added minor seventh above the root. To achieve this in minor keys, the seventh scale degree must be raised to create a major triad on the dominant.

David Cope considers key, consonance and dissonance (relaxation and tension, respectively), and hierarchical relationships the three most basic concepts in tonality.

Carl Dahlhaus lists the characteristic schemata of tonal harmony, "typified in the compositional formulas of the 16th and early 17th centuries," as the "complete cadence" I–ii–V–I, I–IV–V–I, I–IV–I–V–I; the circle of fifths progression I–IV–vii°–iii–vi–ii–V–I; and the major–minor parallelism: minor v–i–VII–III equals major iii–vi–V–I; or minor III–VII–i–v equals major I–V–vi–iii. The last of these progressions is characterized by "retrograde" harmonic motion.

=== Consonance and dissonance ===
The consonance and dissonance of different intervals plays an important role in establishing the tonality of a piece or section in common practice music and popular music. For example, for a simple folk music song in the key of C Major, almost all of the triadic chords in the song will be Major or minor chords which are stable and consonant (e.g., in the key of C Major, commonly used chords include D minor, F Major, G Major, etc.). The most commonly used dissonant chord in a pop song context is the dominant seventh chord built on the fifth scale degree; in the key of C Major, this would be a G dominant seventh chord, or G7 chord, which contains the pitches G, B, D and F. This dominant seventh chord contains a dissonant tritone interval between the notes B and F. In pop music, the listener will expect this tritone to be resolved to a consonant, stable chord (in this case, typically a C Major cadence (coming to rest point) or a deceptive cadence to an A minor chord).

=== Tonal musics ===
"The larger portion of the world's folk and art music can be categorized as tonal," as long as the definition is as follows: "Tonal music gives priority to a single tone or tonic. In this kind of music all the constituent tones and resulting tonal relationships are heard and identified relative to their tonic". In this sense, "All harmonic idioms in popular music are tonal, and none is without function". However, "within the continuing hegemony of tonality there is evidence for a relatively separate tradition of genuine folk musics, which do not operate completely or even mainly according to the assumptions or rules of tonality. … throughout the reign of tonality there seem to have existed subterranean folk musical traditions organized on principles different from tonality, and often modal: Celtic songs and blues are obvious examples".

According to Allan Moore, "part of the heritage of rock lies within common-practice tonality" but, because the leading-note / tonic relationship is "axiomatic to the definition of common-practice tonality", and a fundamental feature of rock music's identity is the absence of a diatonic leading tone, the harmonic practices of rock music, "while sharing many features with classical tonality, are nonetheless distinct". Power chords are especially problematic when trying to apply classical functional tonality to certain varieties of popular music. Genres such as heavy metal, new wave, punk rock, and grunge music "took power chords into new arenas, often with a reduced emphasis on tonal function. These genres are often expressed in two parts – a bass line doubled in fifths, and a single vocal part. Power chord technique was often allied with modal procedure".

Much jazz is tonal, but "functional tonality in jazz has different properties than that of common-practice classical music. These properties are represented by a unique set of rules dictating the unfolding of harmonic function, voice-leading conventions, and the overall behavior of chord tones and chordal extensions".

== History and theory ==
=== 18th century ===
Jean-Philippe Rameau's Treatise on Harmony (1722) is the earliest effort to explain tonal harmony through a coherent system based on acoustical principles, built upon the functional unit being the triad, with inversions.

=== 19th century ===
The term tonalité (tonality) was first used in 1810 by Alexandre Choron in the preface Sommaire de l'histoire de la musique to the Dictionnaire historique des musiciens artistes et amateurs (which he published in collaboration with François-Joseph-Marie Fayolle) to describe the arrangement of the dominant and subdominant above and below the tonic – a constellation that had been made familiar by Rameau. According to Choron, this pattern, which he called tonalité moderne, distinguished modern music's harmonic organization from that of earlier [pre 17th century] music, including tonalité des Grecs (ancient Greek modes) and tonalité ecclésiastique (plainchant). According to Choron, the beginnings of this modern tonality are found in the music of Claudio Monteverdi around the year 1595, but it was more than a century later that the full application of tonal harmony finally supplanted the older reliance on the melodic orientation of the church modes, in the music of the Neapolitan School – most especially that of Francesco Durante.

François-Joseph Fétis developed the concept of tonalité in the 1830s and 1840s, finally codifying his theory of tonality in 1844, in his Traité complet de la théorie et de la pratique de l'harmonie. Fétis saw tonalité moderne as the historically evolving phenomenon with three stages: tonality of ordre transitonique ("transitonic order"), of ordre pluritonique ("pluritonic order") and, finally, ordre omnitonique ("omnitonic order"). The "transitonic" phase of tonality he connected with the late Monteverdi. He described his earliest example of tonalité moderne thus: "In the passage quoted here from Monteverdi's madrigal (Cruda amarilli, mm. 9–19 and 24–30), one sees a tonality determined by the accord parfait [root position major chord] on the tonic, by the sixth chord assigned to the chords on the third and seventh degrees of the scale, by the optional choice of the accord parfait or the sixth chord on the sixth degree, and finally, by the accord parfait and, above all, by the unprepared seventh chord (with major third) on the dominant". Among most subtle representatives of "pluritonic order" there were Mozart and Rossini; this stage he saw as the culmination and perfection of tonalité moderne. The romantic tonality of Berlioz and especially Wagner he related to "omnitonic order" with its "insatiable desire for modulation". His prophetic vision of the omnitonic order (though he didn't approve it personally) as the way of further development of tonality was a remarkable innovation to historic and theoretic concepts of the 19th century.

Tonalité ancienne Fetis described as tonality of ordre unitonique (establishing one key and remaining in that key for the duration of the piece). The principal example of this "unitonic order" tonality he saw in the Western plainchant.

Fétis believed that tonality, tonalité moderne, was entirely cultural, saying, "For the elements of music, nature provides nothing but a multitude of tones differing in pitch, duration, and intensity by the greater or least degree ... The conception of the relationships that exist among them is awakened in the intellect, and, by the action of sensitivity on the one hand, and will on the other, the mind coordinates the tones into different series, each of which corresponds to a particular class of emotions, sentiments, and ideas. Hence these series become various types of tonalities." "But one will say, 'What is the principle behind these scales, and what, if not acoustic phenomena and the laws of mathematics, has set the order of their tones?' I respond that this principle is purely metaphysical [anthropological]. We conceive this order and the melodic and harmonic phenomena that spring from it out of our conformation and education."

Fétis' Traité complet was very popular. In France alone the book was printed between 1844 and 1903 twenty times. The 1st edition was printed in Paris and Brussels in 1844, the 9th edition was printed in Paris in 1864, and the 20th edition was printed in Paris in 1903.

In contrast, Hugo Riemann believed tonality, "affinities between tones" or Tonverwandtschaften, was entirely natural and, following Moritz Hauptmann, that the major third and perfect fifth were the only "directly intelligible" intervals, and that I, IV, and V, the tonic, subdominant, and dominant were related by the perfect fifths between their root notes.

It is in this era that the word tonality was popularized by Fétis.

Theorists such as Hugo Riemann, and later Edward Lowinsky and others, pushed back the date when modern tonality began, and the cadence began to be seen as the definitive way that a tonality is established in a work of music.

In the music of some late-Romantic or post-Romantic composers such as Richard Wagner, Hugo Wolf, Pyotr Ilyich Tchaikovsky, Anton Bruckner, Gustav Mahler, Richard Strauss, Alexander Scriabin, and others, we find a variety of harmonic and linear procedures that have the effect of weakening functional tonality. These procedures may produce a suspension of tonality or may create a sense of tonal ambiguity, even to the point that at times the sense of tonality is completely lost. Schoenberg described this kind of tonality (with references to the music of Wagner, Mahler, and himself, amongst others) as "aufgehobene Tonalität" and "schwebende Tonalität", usually rendered in English as "suspended" ("not in effect", "cancelled") tonality and "fluctuating" ("suspended", "not yet decided") tonality, respectively.

=== 20th century ===
In the early 20th century, the tonality that had prevailed since the 17th century was seen to have reached a crisis or break down point. Because of the "...increased use of the ambiguous chords, the less probable harmonic progressions, and the more unusual melodic and rhythmic inflections," the syntax of functional harmony loosened to the point where, "At best, the felt probabilities of the style system had become obscure; at worst, they were approaching a uniformity which provided few guides for either composition or listening."

Tonality may be considered generally, with no restrictions on the date or place the music was produced, and little restriction on the materials and methods used. This definition includes pre-17th century western music, as well as much non-western music. By the middle of the 20th century, it had become "evident that triadic structure does not necessarily generate a tone center, that non-triadic harmonic formations may be made to function as referential elements, and that the assumption of a twelve-tone complex does not preclude the existence of tone centers". For the composer and theorist George Perle, tonality is not "a matter of 'tone-centeredness', whether based on a 'natural' hierarchy of pitches derived from the overtone series or an 'artificial' pre compositional ordering of the pitch material; nor is it essentially connected to the kinds of pitch structures one finds in traditional diatonic music".

== Theoretical underpinnings ==
One area of disagreement going back to the origin of the term tonality is whether tonality is natural or inherent in acoustical phenomena, whether it is inherent in the human nervous system or a psychological construct, whether it is inborn or learned, and to what degree it is all these things. A viewpoint held by many theorists since the third quarter of the 19th century, following the publication in 1862 of the first edition of Helmholtz's On the Sensation of Tone, holds that diatonic scales and tonality arise from natural overtones.

Rudolph Réti differentiates between harmonic tonality of the traditional kind found in homophony, and melodic tonality, as in monophony. In the harmonic kind, tonality is produced through the V–I chord progression. He argues that in the progression I–x–V–I (and all progressions), V–I is the only step "which as such produces the effect of tonality", and that all other chord successions, diatonic or not, being more or less similar to the tonic-dominant, are "the composer's free invention." He describes melodic tonality (the term coined independently and 10 years earlier by Estonian composer Jaan Soonvald) as being "entirely different from the classical type," wherein, "the whole line is to be understood as a musical unit mainly through its relationship to this basic note [the tonic]," this note not always being the tonic as interpreted according to harmonic tonality. His examples are ancient Jewish and Gregorian chant and other Eastern music, and he points out how these melodies often may be interrupted at any point and returned to the tonic, yet harmonically tonal melodies, such as that from Mozart's The Magic Flute below, are actually "strict harmonic-rhythmic pattern[s]," and include many points "from which it is impossible, that is, illogical, unless we want to destroy the innermost sense of the whole line" to return to the tonic.

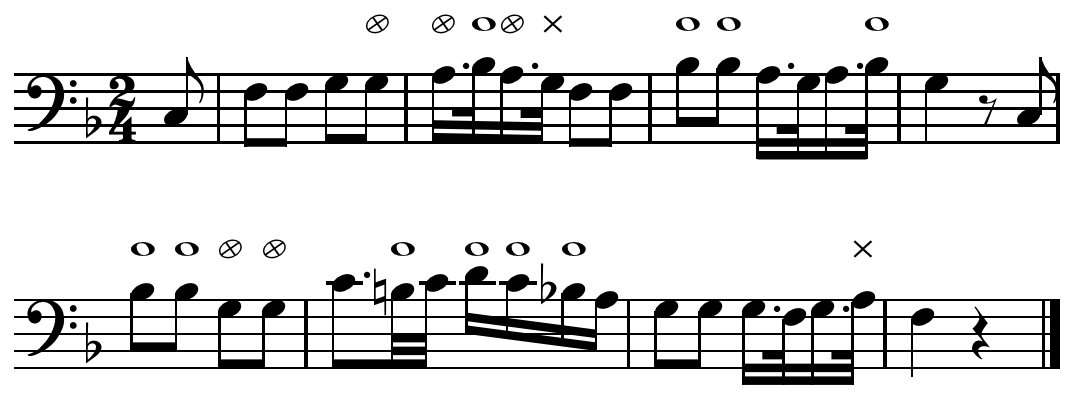

x = return to tonic near inevitable
ⓧ (circled x) = possible but not inevitable
O (circle) = impossible

(Reti (1958), p. 133)

Normally: "Ein Mädchen oder Weibchen" from The Magic Flute

Impossible return after B♮

Consequently, he argues, melodically tonal melodies resist harmonization and only reemerge in western music after, "harmonic tonality was abandoned," as in the music of Claude Debussy: "melodic tonality plus modulation is [Debussy's] modern tonality".

== Outside common-practice period ==
The noun "tonality" and adjective "tonal" are widely applied also, in studies of early and modern Western music, and in non-Western traditional music (Arabic maqam, Indian raga, Indonesian slendro etc.), to the "systematic arrangements of pitch phenomena and relations between them". Felix Wörner, Ullrich Scheideler, and Philip Rupprecht in the introduction to a collection of essays dedicated to the concept and practice of tonality between 1900 and 1950 describe it generally as "the awareness of key in music".

Harold Powers, in a series of articles, used terms "sixteenth-century tonalities" and "Renaissance tonality". He borrowed German "Tonartentyp" from Siegfried Hermelink, who related it to Palestrina, translated it into English as "tonal type", and systematically applied the concept of "tonal types" to Renaissance sacred and paraliturgical polyphony. Cristle Collins Judd (the author of many articles and a thesis dedicated to the early pitch systems) found "tonalities" in this sense in motets of Josquin des Prez. Judd also wrote of "chant-based tonality", meaning "tonal" polyphonic compositions based on plainchant. Peter Lefferts found "tonal types" in the French polyphonic chanson of the 14th century, Italian musicologists Marco Mangani and Daniele Sabaino in the late Renaissance music, and so on.

The wide usage of "tonality" and "tonal" has been supported by several other musicologists (of diverse provenance). A possible reason for this broader usage of terms "tonality" and "tonal" is the attempt to translate German "Tonart" as "tonality" and "Tonarten-" prefix as "tonal" (for example, it is rendered so in the seminal New Grove article "Mode", etc.). Therefore, two different German words "Tonart" and "Tonalität" have sometimes been translated as "tonality" although they are not the same words in German.

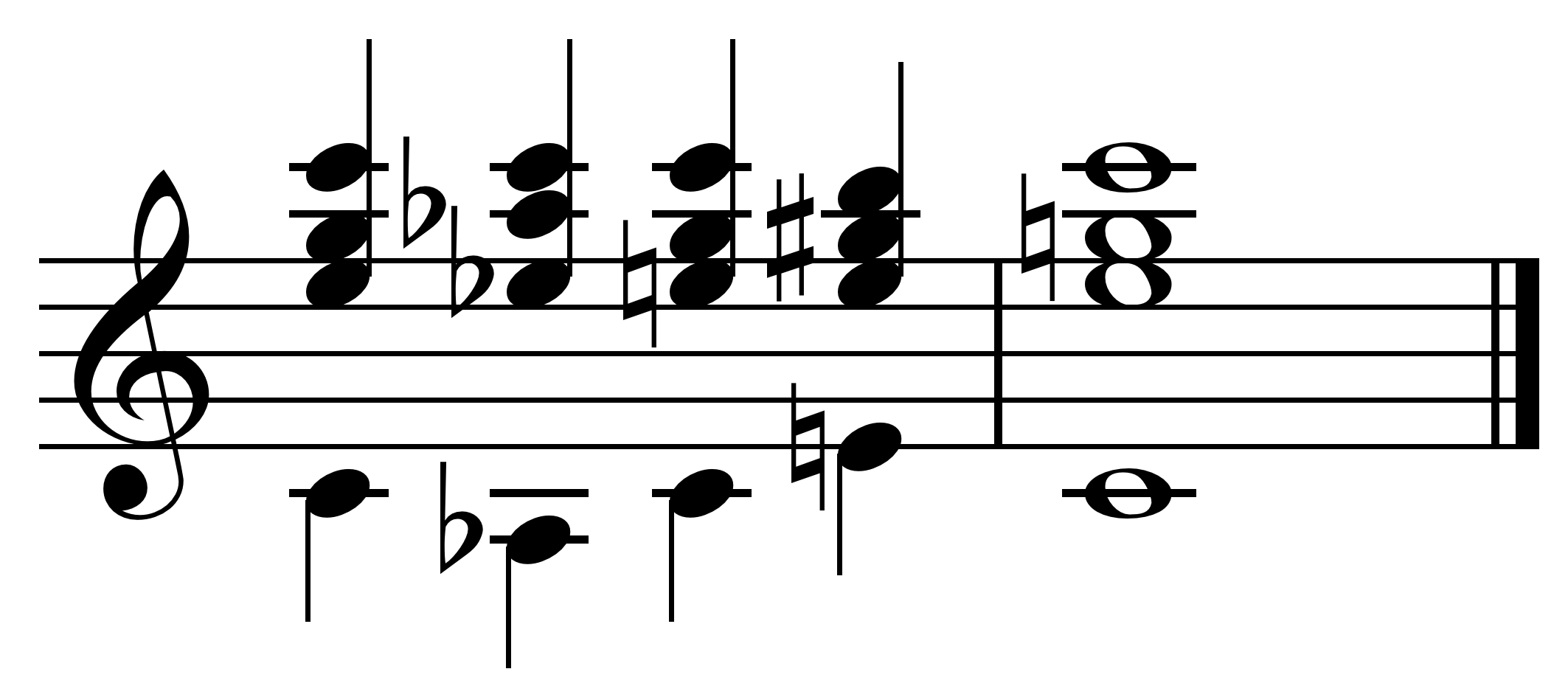
Riemann's illustration of a non-diatonic cadence possessing Tonalität without Tonart

In 1882, Hugo Riemann defined the term Tonalität specifically to include chromatic as well as diatonic relationships to a tonic, in contrast to the usual diatonic concept of Tonart. In the neo-Riemannian theory of the late 20th century, however, the same chromatic chord relations cited by Riemann came to be regarded as a fundamental example of nontonal triadic relations, reinterpreted as a product of the hexatonic cycle (the six-pitch-class set forming a scale of alternating minor thirds and semitones, Forte's set-type 6–20, but manifested as a succession of from four to six alternating major and minor triads), defined without reference to a tonic.

In the 20th century, music that no longer conformed to the strict definition of common-practice tonality could nevertheless still involve musical phenomena (harmonies, cadential formulae, harmonic progressions, melodic gestures, formal categories) arranged or understood in relation to a referential tonic. For example, the closing bars of the first movement of Béla Bartók's Music for Strings, Percussion and Celesta do not involve a composed-out triad, but rather a diverging-converging pair of chromatic lines moving from a unison A to an octave E♭ and back to a unison A again, providing a framing "deep structure" based on a tritone relationship that nevertheless is not analogous to a tonic-dominant axis, but rather remains within the single functional domain of the tonic, A. To distinguish this species of tonality (found also, for example, in the music of Barber, Berg, Bernstein, Britten, Fine, Hindemith, Poulenc, Prokofiev, and, especially, Stravinsky) from the stricter kind associated with the 18th century, some writers use the term "neotonality", while others prefer to use the term centricity, and still others retain the term tonality, in its broader sense or use word combinations like extended tonality.

== Computational methods to determine the key ==
In music information retrieval, techniques have been developed to determine the key of a piece of classical Western music (recorded in audio data format) automatically. These methods are often based on a compressed representation of the pitch content in a 12-dimensional pitch-class profile (chromagram) and a subsequent procedure that finds the best match between this representation and one of the prototype vectors of the 24 minor and major keys. For implementation, often the constant-Q transform is used, displaying the musical signal on a log frequency scale. Although a radical (over)simplification of the concept of tonality, such methods can predict the key of classical Western music well for most pieces. Other methods also take into consideration the sequentiality of music.

== See also ==
- History of music
- Harry Partch' Otonality and utonality
- Peter Westergaard's tonal theory
- Polytonality
- Tonality diamond
- Schenkerian analysis
