= Carl A. Huffman =

American philosopher (born 1951)

Carl Huffman
- Born: 1951 (age 74–75)
- Awards: ACLS Fellowship, NEH Fellowship, Guggenheim Fellowship

Education
- Education: St. John's College Santa Fe, University of Colorado (BA, MA), University of Texas (PhD)

Philosophical work
- Era: 21st-century
- Region: Western philosophy
- Institutions: DePauw University
- Main interests: ancient Greek philosophy

Carl Huffman (born 1951) is an American classical scholar and Professor Emeritus of Classical Studies at DePauw University. He is known for his works on ancient Greek philosophy.

== Books ==
- Archytas of Tarentum: Pythagorean, Philosopher, and Mathematician King, Cambridge University Press, Cambridge 2005
- Philolaus of Croton: Pythgorean and Presocratic, Cambridge University Press, Cambridge 1993
