= Flora Levin =

American classicist

Flora R. Levin (died 2009) was a historian of ancient Greek music and mathematics, particularly known for her work on Nicomachus.

== Books ==
Levin's books included:

- The Harmonics of Nicomachus and the Pythagorean Tradition (American Philological Association, 1975)
- The Manual of Harmonics of Nicomachus the Pythagorean (translated and with commentary by Levin, Phanes Press, 1994)
- Greek Reflections on the Nature of Music (Cambridge University Press, 2009)

== Education and career ==
Levin taught classics at Case Western Reserve University prior to 1962, and completed a Ph.D. at Columbia University in 1967. She died in 2009.
