= Rudolf Westphal =

19th-century German musical scholar

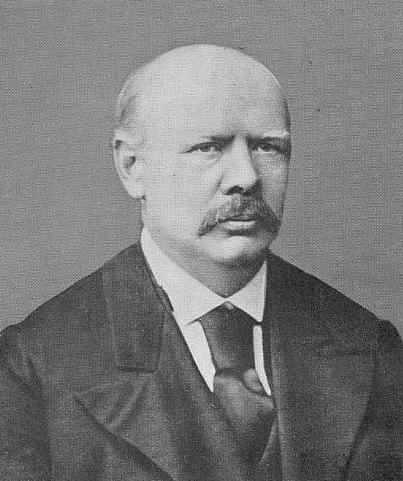
- Rudolf Westphal
- Born: 3 July 1826; Obernkirchen, Germany
- Died: 10 July 1892 (aged 66)
- Occupation: musical scholar

Rudolf Westphal (3 July 1826 – 10 July 1892) was a German classical scholar.

== Life ==
Westphal was born at Obernkirchen in Schaumburg. He studied at Marburg and Tübingen, and was professor at Breslau (1858–1862) and Moscow (1875–1879). He subsequently lived at Bückeburg, and died at Stadthagen in Schaumburg-Lippe on 10 July 1892. Westphal devoted his life in translating and interpreting the works of Aristoxenus. He then applied Greek theories of poetic meter to eighteenth- and nineteenth century music.

Westphal was a man of varied attainments, but his chief claim to remembrance rests upon his contributions on Greek music and metre. His chief works were:

- Griechische Metrik (3rd ed., 1885–1889)
- System der antiken Rhythmik (1865)
- Hephaestion's De metris enchiridion (1866)
- Aristoxenus of Tarentum (translation and commentary, 1883–1893, vol. ii. being edited after his death by F Saran)
- Die Musik des griechischen Altertums (1883)
- Allgemeine Metrik der indogermanischen and semitischen Volker (1892)

He made translations of Catullus (1870) and of Aristophanes' Acharnians (1889), in which he successfully reproduced the Dorisms in Low German.
