= Richard Crocker (musicologist) =

American musicologist (1927–2021)

- Born: Richard Lincoln Crocker; February 17, 1927; Roxbury, Boston, US
- Died: November 4, 2021 (aged 94); US
- Known for: Scholarship on Medieval music, particularly the sequence

Academic background
- Education: Yale University (BA)

Academic work
- Discipline: Medieval music
- Institutions: Yale University; University of California at Berkeley

Richard Lincoln Crocker (February 17, 1927 – September 4, 2021) was an American musicologist who specialized in Medieval music. His career was spent at the University of California at Berkeley, where his research into the musical sequence was a landmark in the understanding of the genre.

== Life and career ==
Richard Lincoln Crocker was born in Roxbury, Boston, US on February 17, 1927. He received a Bachelor of Arts at Yale University, while studying under Leo Schrade. After teaching at his alma mater from 1955 to 1963, he spent his career at the University of California at Berkeley until retiring in 1994. He died on September 4, 2021.

Crocker specialized in Medieval music and his publications were instrumental in understanding the musical sequence. He also wrote on Gregorian chant and Ancient Greek music.
