= Andrew Barker (classicist) =

British classicist and academic (1943–2021)

Andrew Barker FBA
- Born: Andrew Dennison Barker; 24 April 1943
- Died: 22 July 2021 (aged 78)
- Children: Five

Academic background
- Education: Christ's Hospital
- Alma mater: The Queen's College, Oxford; Australian National University

Academic work
- Discipline: Classics
- Sub-discipline: Ancient Greek music; Ancient Greek philosophy; musical theory
- Institutions: University of Warwick; Faculty of Classics, University of Cambridge; Selwyn College, Cambridge; University of Otago; University of Birmingham

Andrew Dennison Barker, FBA (24 April 1943 – 22 July 2021) was a British classicist and academic, specialising in ancient Greek music and the intersection between musical theory and philosophy. He was Professor of Classics at the University of Birmingham from 1998 to 2008, and had previously taught at the University of Warwick, University of Cambridge, and Selwyn College, Cambridge.

== Early life and education ==
Barker was born on 24 April 1943. He was educated at Christ's Hospital, then an all-boys charity school in Southwater, Sussex. He studied Literae Humaniores at The Queen's College, Oxford, graduating with a Bachelor of Arts (BA) degree. He then studied at the philosophy of biology at the Australian National University, from which he completed his Doctor of Philosophy (PhD) degree.

== Academic career ==
Barker's early specialism was ancient Greek philosophy. He later became interested in ancient musical theory and the music of ancient Greece. This led to an interest in the "points of intersection between musical theory and philosophy".

In 1970, Barker joined the Philosophy Department of the University of Warwick as a lecturer in philosophy. In 1976, he joined the Faculty of Classics, University of Cambridge as an assistant lecturer in classics. From 1977 to 1978, he was also a fellow of Selwyn College, Cambridge, and its director of studies in classics and philosophy. He returned to Warwick in 1978 and was promoted to senior lecturer in 1987.

Wanting to move from a philosophy specialist to a classicist, Barker joined the Classics Department of the University of Otago in 1992. He was a senior lecturer in classics from 1992 to 1995, and was appointed a Professor in 1995. He returned to England to join the University of Birmingham in 1996 as Reader in Classics. He was promoted to Professor of Classics in 1998. He also held a British Academy Research Professorship between 2000 and 2003. He retired from full-time academia in 2008 and was appointed emeritus professor.

== Personal life ==
Barker was first married to Susan Margaret Hough; their marriage was dissolved in 1976. Together they had two sons. In 1978, he married Jill Davida Newman. Together they had three children: one daughter and two sons.

Barker died on 22 July 2021, at the age of 78.

== Honours ==
In 2005, Barker was elected a Fellow of the British Academy (FBA), the United Kingdom's national academy for the humanities and social sciences. He gave the inaugural Martin West Memorial Lecture at the University of Oxford in March 2017; his lecture was titled "Migrating musical myths: the case of Euripides and the Libyan lotos".

== Selected works ==
- Barker, Andrew, ed. (1984). Greek Musical Writings: Volume 1, The Musician and His Art. Cambridge: Cambridge University Press. ISBN 978-0521389112.
- Barker, Andrew, ed. (1989). Greek Musical Writings: Volume 2, Harmonic and Acoustic Theory. Cambridge: Cambridge University Press. ISBN 978-0521616973.
- Barker, Andrew (2000). Scientific Method in Ptolemy's Harmonics. Cambridge: Cambridge University Press. ISBN 978-0521553728.
- Barker, Andrew (2007). The Science of Harmonics in Classical Greece. Cambridge: Cambridge University Press. ISBN 978-1139468626.
- Barker, Andrew (2014). Ancient Greek Writers on Their Musical Past: Studies in Greek Musical Historiography. Pisa and Rome: Fabrizio Serra editore. ISBN 978-8862276894.
- Barker, Andrew (2015). Porphyry's Commentary on Ptolemy's Harmonics: A Greek Text and Annotated Translation. Cambridge: Cambridge University Press. ISBN 978-1107003859.
