= List of Turkish makams =

Here is a list of Turkish makams of Ottoman classical music.

== Some main makams ==
- Çargah
- Buselik
- Kürdî
- Rast
- Saba
- Uşşak
- Hicaz
- Uzzal
- Hümayun
- Acem
- Zirgüleli Hicaz
- Neva
- Tahir
- Beyati
- Muhayyer
- Segâh
- Gülizâr
- Hüseyni
- Karcığar
- Basit Suzinak

== Makams ==
Makam family	Makam	Features	Lower Çeşni - Starting Note Bold	Higher Çeşni: Starting Note in Bold		Yeden/Lower Extension: Starting Note	Higher Extension: Starting Note	Notes	Western Approximation (Note: Based on 48-TET approximations, 48-TET approximations for Turkish makam music are suboptimal, but they do provide for direct comparisons with 12-TET music (because 48 is divisible by 12))
	Rast	Seyir: Ascending	Rast pentachord	Rast tetrachord (Ascending)	Buselik tetrachord (Descending)	Rast tetrachord		Named after the Durak note Rast.	Ascending: Major (3, 7); Descending: Mixolydian (3)
	Rast	Seyir: Ascending	**Rast**; Dügâh; Segâh; Çârgâh; Neva	**Neva**; Hüseynî; Eviç; Gerdaniye	**Neva**; Hüseynî; Acem; Gerdaniye	**Yegâh**; Hüseynî-Aşiran; Irak (Yeden); Gerdaniye		Named after the Durak note Rast.	Ascending: Major (3, 7); Descending: Mixolydian (3)
	Çârgâh	Seyir: Ascending or Ascending-Descending	Çârgâh pentachord	Çârgâh tetrachord				Named after the Durak note Çârgâh.	
	Çârgâh	Seyir: Ascending or Ascending-Descending	**Kaba Çârgâh**; Yegâh; Hüseyni-Aşiran; Acem-Aşiran; Rast	**Rast**; Dügâh; Buselik; Çârgâh		Kaba Buselik (Yeden)		Named after the Durak note Çârgâh.	
	Çârgâh	Seyir: Ascending or Ascending-Descending	**Çârgâh**; Neva; Hüseynî; Acem; Gerdaniye	**Gerdaniye**; Muhayyer; Tiz Buselik; Tiz Çârgâh		Buselik (Yeden)		Named after the Durak note Çârgâh.	
	Kürdî		Kürdî tetrachord from Dügâh	Buselik pentachord from Neva			Kürdî tetrachord from Muhayyer	Named after the second note of the scale, Kürdî.	
	Nikriz		Nikriz pentachord from Rast	Rast tetrachord from Neva	Buselik tetrachord from Neva				
	Neveser		Nikriz pentachord from Rast	Hicaz tetrachord from Neva					

== A ==
1. Âb-ı Kevser

2. Acem

3. Acem-Aşîrân

4. Acem-Bâ-Zir-Keşîde

5. Acem-Bûselik

6. Acem-Irak

7. Acem-Kürdî

8. Acem-Murassa

9. Acem-Rast

10. Acem-Zemzeme

11. Acem-Zir-Keşîde

12. Acemli Rast

12.5. Acemli Yegâh

13. Âgâaze-i Kâbili

14. Aheng-i-Tarâb

15. Akberi

16. Anber-Efşân

17. Arabân

18. Arabân-Kürdî

19. Arabân-Nigâr

20. Arabân-ı-Cedîd

21. Arazbâr

22. Arazbâr-Bûselik

23. Arazbâr-Zemzeme

24. Âvâz-ı Zenbûr

25. Azrâ

26. Aşîrân

27. Aşîrân-Mâye

28. Aşîrân-Vefâdar

29. Aşîrân-Zemzeme

30. Aşk-Efzâ

== B ==
31. Bâd-ı-Sabâ

32. Bahâr

33. Bahr-i-Nâzik

Bayâti

34. Bayâti

35. Bayâti-Arabân

36. Bayâti-Arabân-Bûselik

37. Bayâti-Aşîrân

38. Bayâti-Bûselik

39. Bayâti-Hisâr

40. Bayâti-Isfahân

41. Bayâti-Kürdî

42. Bend-i-Bûselik

43. Bend-i-Hisâr

44. Beste-Hisâr

45. Beste-Isfahân

46. Beste-Nigâr

47. Beste-Nigâr-Hisarek

48. Beste-Nigâr-ı-Atîyk

49. Beste-Nigâr-ı-Kadîm

50. Beynel-Bahreyn

51. Beyzâ

52. Bezm-i Tarâb

53. Bezmâra

54. Buhârî

55. Bûselik

56. Bûselik-Aşîrân

57. Bûselik-Gerdâniye

58. Bûselik-Geveyşt

59. Bûselik-Mâye

60. Bûselik-Nevrûz

61. Bûselik-Selmek

62. Bûselik-Şehnaz

63. Bûstan

64. Büzürk

65. Büzürk-Gerdâniye

66. Büzürk-Geveyşt

67. Büzürk-Mâye

68. Büzürk-Nevrûz

69. Büzürk-Selmek

70. Büzürk-Şehnâz

== C ==
71. Canfezâ

72. Çârgâh

73. Çârgâh-Âcem

74. Çârgâh-Gerdâniye

75. Çârgâh-Mahûr

76. Çehâr-Âgâazin

== D ==
77. Daği-Bayâti

78. Danişverân

79. Dil Âvîz

80. Dil-Ârâ

81. Dil-Efruz

82. Dil-Keşîde

83. Dil-Nişîn

84. Dil-Rübâ

85. Dil-Sûz

86. Dildâr

87. Dilkeş-Hâverân

88. Dilküşâ

89. Dost-Gahî

90. Dügâh

91. Dügâh-Bûselik

92. Dügâh-Mâye

93. Dügâh-ı Acem

94. Dügâh-ı Kadîm

== E ==
95. Ebû-Selik

96. Efrûhiten

97. Evcârâ

98. Evc (Eviç)

99. Evc-Aşirân

100. Evc-Bûselik

101. Evc-Gerdâniye

102. Evc-i Muhâlif

103. Evc-Isfahân

104. Evc-Maklüb

105. Evc-Mâye

106. Evc-Nihâvendi

== F ==
107. Ferâh

108. Ferâh-Âver

109. Ferâh-Zâyi

110. Ferâhfezâ

111. Ferâhnâk

112. Ferâhnümâ

113. Ferâhzâr

== G ==
114. Gamz-Edâ

115. Gazâl

116. Gerdâniye

117. Gerdâniye-Bûselik

118. Gerdâniye-Büzürk

119. Gerdâniye-Hicâz

120. Gerdâniye-Hüseynî

121. Gerdâniye-Irak

122. Gerdâniye-Isfahân

123. Gerdâniye-Kûçek

124. Gerdâniye-Kürdî

125. Gerdâniye-Nevâ

126. Gerdâniye-Nigâr

127. Gerdâniye-Nikrîzi

128. Gerdâniye-Rast

129. Gerdâniye-Rehâvî

130. Gerdâniye-Uşşâk

131. Gerdâniye-Zirgüle

132. Geveyşt

133. Geveyşt-Bûselik

134. Geveyşt-Büzürk

135. Geveyşt-Gerdâniye

136. Geveyşt-Hicâz

137. Geveyşt-Hüseynî

138. Geveyşt-Irak

139. Geveyşt-Isfahân

140. Geveyşt-Kûçek

141. Geveyşt-Nevâ

142. Geveyşt-Rehâvî

143. Geveyşt-Uşşâk

144. Geveyşt-Zirgüle

145. Gonca-i-Rânâ

146. Gururî

147. Gül-Ruh

148. Güldeste

149. Gülistân

150. Gülizâr

151. Gülnâri

152. Gülzâr

153. Gülşen-i Vefâ

== H ==
154. Hadrâ (Hazrâ)

155. Harran

156. Hâver

157. Hayâl-i Murâd

158. Hayân

159. Hazân

160. Heftgâh

161. Hicâz

162. Hicâz Aşirân

163. Hicâz-Acem

164. Hicâz-Bûselik

165. Hicâz-Büzürk

166. Hicâz-Gerdâniye

167. Hicâz-Geveyşt

168. Hicâz-Irak

169. Hicâz-Mâye

170. Hicâz-Nevrûz

171. Hicâz-Selmek

172. Hicâz-ı Muhâlif

173. Hicâz-ı Reke

174. Hicâz-ı Türkî

175. Hicâz-ı-Hicâz

176. Hicâz-Zemzeme

177. Hicâz-Şehnâz

178. Hicâzeyn

179. Hicâzî Hüseynî

180. Hicâzî Isfahân

181. Hicâzî Uşşâk

182. Hicâzkâr

183. Hicâzkâr-Bûselik

184. Hicâzkârı-Kürdî

185. Hisâr

186. Hisâr- Vech-i Şehnâz

187. Hisâr-Aşîrân

188. Hisâr-Bûselik

189. Hisâr-Evc

190. Hisâr-ı Büzürk

191. Hisâr-ı Gayr-ı Müstear

192. Hisâr-ı Kâdim

193. Hisâr-ı Kürdî

194. Hisâr-ı Nîk

195. Hisârek

196. Hocest

197. Horasan

198. Hoş-Serâ

199. Hucet

200. Hudavendigâr

201. Hufte-Isfahân

202. Hûzi

203. Huzî-Aşîrân

204. Hûzi-Bûselik

205. Hümâyûn

206. Hüseynî

207. Hüseynî- Geveyşt

208. Hüseynî-Acem

209. Hüseynî-Aşîrân

210. Hüseynî-Bûselik

211. Hüseynî-Gerdâniye

212. Hüseynî-Horasâni

213. Hüseynî-Kürdî (Zemzeme)

214. Hüseynî-Nevrûz

215. Hüseynî-Nikrîz

216. Hüseynî-Rehâvi

217. Hüseynî-Sabâ

218. Hüseynî-Şehnâz

219. Hüsn-ü Ân

220. Hüzzâm

221. Hüzzâm-ı Cedîd

222. Hüzzâm-ı Kadîm

223. Hüzzâm-ı Rûmi

== I ==
224. Irak

225. Irak-Geceyşt

226. Irak-Gerdâniye

227. Irak-Mâye

228. Irak-Nevrûz

229. Irak-Selmek

230. Irak-Şehnâz

231. Irakı Acem

232. Isfahân

233. Isfahân-Bûselik

234. Isfahân-Gerdâniye

235. Isfahân-Geveyşt

236. Isfahân-Irak

237. Isfahân-Mâye

238. Isfahân-Nevrûz

239. Isfahân-Selmek

240. Ifahân-ı Cedîd

241. Isfahân-ı Sultâni

242. Isfahân-Zemzeme

243. Isfahân-Şehnâz

244. Isfahânek-i Atîyk

245. Isfahânek-i Cedîd

246. Isfahânek

== K ==
247. Kâbilî

248. Karcığar

249. Kebûter

250. Kûçek

251. Kûçek-Geveyşt

252. Kûçek-Mâye

253. Kûçek-Nevrûz

254. Kûçek-Selmek

255. Kûçek-Sümbüle

256. Kûçek-Zemzeme

257. Kûçek-Şehnâz

258. Kürdî

259. Kürdî-Aşîrân

260. Kürdîli Çârgâh

261. Kürdîli Hicâzkâr

262. Kürdîli Hümâyûn

== L ==
263. Lâle-Gül

264. Lâle-Rûh

== M ==
265. Mâhûr

266. Mâhûr-Aşîrân

267. Mâhûr-Bûselik

268. Mâhûr-Hân

269. Mâhûr-i Kebîr

270. Mâhûr-i Kebîr-i Kadîm

271. Mâhûr-i Sagîyr

272. Mâhûrek (Mâhûr-i Sagîyr)

273. Mâhûri

274. Matlûb

275. Matlûbek

276. Mâverâünnehr

277. Mâye

278. Mâye-Bûselik

279. Mâye-Büzürk

280. Mâye-Hicâz

281. Mâye-Hüseynî

282. Mâye-i Atîyk

283. Mâye-i Kebîr

284. Mâye-i Kevser

285. Mâye-Irak

286. Mâye-Isfahân

287. Mâye-Kûçek

288. Mâye-Nevâ

289. Mâye-Rast (Rast-Mâye)

290. Mâye-Rehâvî

291. Mâye-Uşşâk

292. Mâye-Zirgüle

293. Mâşûk

294. Meclis-Efrûz

295. Mellâhi

296. Mezmîm

297. Mihr-i Cân

298. Muhâlif

299. Muhâlif-i Irak

300. Muhâlif-i Rast

301. Muhâlifek

302. Muhayyer

303. Muhayyer Bûselik

304. Muhayyer Irak

305. Muhayyer Kürdî

306. Muhayyer Segâh

307. Muhayyer Sümbüle

308. Muhayyer Zirgüle

309. Muhayyer-Zîrkeş

310. Mûtedil

311. Mûtrıbân

312. Mûvafık

313. Müberkâa

314. Mücenebûr-Remel

315. Müjdegâni

316. Mürgâk

317. Müsteâr

318. Müsteârek

319. Müteaddi

320. Müşküye (Segâh-Aşîrân)

== N ==
321. Na-Murâd

322. Nağme-i Kâbil

323. Nâz

324. Nâz-u Niyaz

325. Nâzenin

326. Necd-i Hüseynî

327. Nesîm

328. Nev-Edâ

329. Nev-Eser

330. Nev-Resîde

331. Nevâ

332. Nevâ-Acem

333. Nevâ-Aşîrân

334. Nevâ-Bûselik

335. Nevâ-Gerdâniye

336. Nevâ-Geveyşt

337. Nevâ-Hüseynî

338. Nevâ-Kürdî

339. Nevâ-Mâye

340. Nevâ-Nevrûz

341. Nevâ-Selmek

342. Nevâ-Şehnâz

343. Nevây-ı Uşşâk

344. Nevâziş

345. Nevbahâr

346. Nevrûz

347. Nevrûz-Bayâti

348. Nevrûz-Bûselik

349. Nevrûz-Büzürk

350. Nevrûz-Hicâz

351. Nevrûz-Hüseynî

352. Nevrûz-i Acem

353. Nevrûz-i Arâb

354. Nevrûz-i Hârâ

355. Nevrûz-i Rast

356. Nevrûz-i Rûmî

357. Nevrûz-i Sultâni

358. Nevrûz-Irak

359. Nevrûz-Isfahân

360. Nevrûz-Kûçek

361. Nevrûz-Nevâ

362. Nevrûz-Rehâvî

363. Nevrûz-Sabâ

364. Nevrûz-Uşşâk

365. Nevrûz-Zirgüle

366. Neşât-Âver

367. Nigâr

368. Nigâr-ı Nîk

369. Nigâr-ı Nîk-Acem

370. Nigârçek

371. Nigârek

372. Nihâvend

373. Nihâvendi Cedîd

374. Nihâvendi Kebir

375. Nihâvendi Rûmî

376. Nihâvendi Sagîyr

377. Nikrîz

378. Nikrîz-i Kebir

379. Nikrîz-i Sagîyr

380. Nikrîz-Segâh

381. Nişâbûr (Nişâpûr)

382. Nişâbûrek

383. Nühüft (Nihift)

384. Nühüft-Hicâzî

385. Nühüft-i Kâdîm

== P ==
386. Pay-Zen-i Sabâ

387. Pençgâh

388. Pençgâh-ı Aşl

389. Pençgâh-ı Zâid (Zâide)

390. Perzerîn

391. Pesendîde

392. Pûşegân

== R ==
393. Râh-i Gül

394. Râh-i Hâr-Ken

395. Râh-i Hâr-Keş

396. Râh-i Hûsrevâni

397. Râh-i Rûh

398. Râh-i Şeb-Diz

399. Rahat-Fezâ

400. Rahâtül-Ervâh

401. Râmiş-Huvar

402. Râmiş-i Cân

Rast.

403. Rast

404. Rast-Acem

405. Rast-Gerdâniye

406. Rast-Geveyşt

407. Rast-Hâverân

408. Rast-Kürdî

409. Rast-Mâhir

410. Rast-Mâye

411. Rast-Nevrûz

412. Rast-Selmek

413. Rast-ı Cedîd

414. Rast-ı Kebîr

415. Rast-Şehnâz

416. Rehâvî (Rehâvî)

417. Rehâvî-Gerdanîye

418. Rehâvî-Geveyşt

419. Rehâvî-Mâye

420. Rehâvî-Nevrûz

421. Rehâvî-Selmek

422. Rehâvî-Şehnâz

423. Rekb (Çârgâh-Rekb)

424. Rekb-i Nevrûz

425. Reng-i Dil

426. Revâ-Irak

427. Revnâk-Nümâ

428. Ridâyî

429. Rûh

430. Rûh-Efzâ

431. Rûhnevâz (Rûhnüvâz)

432. Rûy-i Aşîrân

433. Rûy-i Hicâz

434. Rûy-i Irak

435. Rıdvân

== S ==
436. Sabâ

437. Sabâ-Aşîrân

438. Sabâ-Bûselik

439. Sabâ-Uşşâk

440. Sabâ-Zemzeme

441. Safâ

442. Sâzkâr

443. Se-Bahr

444. Sebz-Ender-Sebz

445. Sebz-Ender-Sebz-i Hisâr

446. Sebz-Ender-Sebz-i Kadîm

447. Sebz-î Hisâr

448. Sebz-î Tâze

449. Sebzî

450. Segâh

451. Segâh-Acem

452. Segâh-Arabân

453. Segâh-Mâye (Mâye)

454. Segâh-Muhayyer

455. Selmek (Selmekî)

456. Selmek-Büzürk

457. Selmek-Hicâz

458. Selmek-Hüseynî

459. Selmek-i Kebîr

460. Selmek-i Sagîyr

461. Selmek-Irak

462. Selmek-Isfahân

463. Selmek-Kûçek

464. Selmek-Rast

465. Selmek-Rehâvî

466. Selmek-Zirgüle

467. Ser-Bülend

468. Ser-Henk

469. Serendâz (Seng-Endâz)

470. Sipihr

471. Sipihr-Hüseynî

472. Sipihr-Uşşâk

473. Sireng

474. Sultân-ı Bûselik

475. Sultân-ı Cedîd

476. Sultân-ı Nevâ

477. Sultân-ı Segâh

478. Sultân-ı Yegâh

479. Sultân-ı-Irak

480. Suz-i Dil

481. Suz-i Dilâra

482. Sûznâk (Basit Sûzinâk)

483. Sünbüle

484. Sünbüle-i Kâdîm

485. Sünbüle-Nihâvend

486. Şâd-Kâmı

487. Şâh

488. Şâhî

489. Şâhvâr (Şehvâr)

490. Şedd-i Arabân

491. Şehnâz

492. Şehnâz-Aşîrân

493. Şehnâz-Bûselik

494. Şehnâz-Büzürk

495. Şehnâz-Hâverân (Irak)

496. Şehnâz-Hicâz

497. Şehnâz-Hüseynî

498. Şehnâz-Kûçek

499. Şehnâz-Kürdî

500. Şehnâz-Nevâ

501. Şehnâz-Rast

502. Şehnâz-Rehâvî

503. Şehnâz-Uşşâk

504. Şehnâz-Zirgüle

505. Şehr-i Naz (Şehr-Nâz)

506. Şehvâr

507. Şems-Efrûz

508. Şeref-Nümâ

509. Şevk-Âver

510. Şevk-Efzâ

511. Şevk-Engîz

512. Şevk-i Cedîd

513. Şevk-i Dil

514. Şevk-i Serâb

515. Şevk-i Tarâb

516. Şeşgâh

517. Şiâr

518. Şinâver

519. Şirâz

520. Şirâz-Sünbüle

521. Şirîn

522. Şîvekâr

523. Şîvekeş

524. Şîvenümâ

525. Şûrî

526. Şüster

== T ==
527. Tâhir

528. Tâhir-Bûselik

529. Tâhir-i Kebîr

530. Tâhir-i Sagîyr

531. Tâhir-Kürdî

532. Tanık

533. Tarz-ı Bihîn

534. Tarz-ı Cedîd

535. Tarz-ı Nevîn

536. Tebrîz

537. Tehrîzî

538. Tereşşüd

539. Terkîb-i Sabâ

540. Tüvânger

== U ==
541. Urfa-Mâhûr

542. Uzzâl

543. Uzzâl-Acem

544. Uzzâl-Hüseynî

545. Uzzâl-Şehnâz

546. Uşşâk

547. Uşşâk-Aşîrân

548. Uşşâk-Gerdâniye

549. Uşşâk-Geveyşt

550. Uşşâk-Mâye

551. Uşşâk-Nevrûz

552. Uşşâk-Selmek

553. Uşşâk-Şehnâz

== V ==
554. Vâmık

555. Vech-i Arazbâr

556. Vech-i Bûselik

557. Vech-i Hüseynî

558. Vech-i Şehnâz

== Y ==
559. Yâr

560. Yegâh

== Z ==
561. Zâd-ı Dil

562. Zâvîl (Zavil)

563. Zâvîli (Zâvûli)

564. Zâvîli Isfahân

565. Zâvîli Segâh

566. Zemzem

567. Zemzeme (Eski Zemzeme)

568. Zemzeme-Kürdî

569. Zende-Rûd

570. Zengüle (Zirgüle)

571. Zengüle-Bûselik

572. Zengüle-Gerdâniye

573. Zengüle-Geveyşt

574. Zengüle-Mâye

575. Zengüle-Nevrûz

576. Zengüle-Selmek

577. Zengüle-Şehnâz

578. Zengüleli Sûznak

579. Zevk-Bahş

580. Zevk-i Dil

581. Zevk-u Tarâb

582. Zirefkend

583. Zirefkend Şarkı

584. Zirefkend-i Büzürk

585. Zirefkend-i Kûçek

586. Zirefkend-i Rûmi

587. Zirkeş-Hâveran

588. Zirkeş-Hüseynî

589. Zirkeşîde

590. Zülf-i Nigâr
