= Geçki =

Modal interchange in Turkish makam music

Geçki is the usage of a different makam during the performance of another makam, which may or may not lead to a modulation. It is a form of modal interchange, used specifically within Turkish makam music.

== Music theory ==
As with modal interchange, it is easier to do a geçki between two similar makams. There are two forms of geçki, the ones that create a change in function and the ones that create a change in identity. These two forms of geçki can be used simultaneously.

=== Change in function ===
A geçki can happen without changing any notes by changing the roles of the notes within a makam. Neva and Hüseynî share many of their features, including their notes. However, Neva has its Güçlü in its fourth note, while Hüseynî has its Güçlü in its fifth note. So performing the fifth note as a Güçlü while performing the Neva makam is an example of a Hüseynî geçki within a Neva makam.

A geçki can also happen through the change in the Durak (the tonic note). The Rast makam can be reached by making the Yeden (the leading tone) of the Uşşak makam into the current Durak. This is because the lower pentachord of Rast functions as a mode of the lower tetrachord (including the Yeden) of Uşşak.

A visualisation of how the geçki between Hicaz and Nikriz would work can be seen below. (Note: This geçki can take place between any makam that has the Nikriz pentachord as its lower çeşni and any makam that has the Hicaz pentachord as its lower çeşni. To keep the example simple, the scales themselves are given.) Changing the Durak note from the 1st to the 2nd note (or vice-versa) would be a geçki between these makams.

Pentachord	Tetrachord	Note order	Step to next note (Number of steps)	Note name starting from Rast
Nikriz pentachord	-	1	T (9)	Rast
Nikriz pentachord	Hicaz tetrachord (starting from Dügâh)	2	S (5)	Dügâh
Nikriz pentachord	Hicaz tetrachord (starting from Dügâh)	3	A (12)	Dik Kürdî
Nikriz pentachord	Hicaz tetrachord (starting from Dügâh)	4	S (5)	Nim Hicaz
Nikriz pentachord	Hicaz tetrachord (starting from Dügâh)	5	-	Neva

=== Change in identity ===
Geçki can also happen through changing a note in a makam and thereby modulating it into a different makam. This change is usually done through the use of accidentals.

An example of this is a geçki between Rast and Basit Suzinak. While performing, if one were to flat the 6th note of Rast, they would get Basit Suzinak.

== See also ==
- Çeşni
- Seyir
