= Uşşak pitch class set =

Five notes defining the Buselik scale

In Turkish classical music, the Uşşak pitch class set is a set of scales that are named after the Uşşak or Hüseynî makams. For Uşşak, there is the Uşşak tetrachord and the Hüseynî pentachord. While in Arabic maqam music, maqam Bayati is taken as a basic tetrachord, in Turkish makam music, Uşşak is taken as a basic tetrachord instead.

== Uşşak tetrachord and Hüseynî pentachord in 53-TET ==
The intervals of the Uşşak tetrachord and Hüseynî pentachord within 53 Tone Equal Temperament are given in the table:

Uşşak pitch class set
Pentachord	Tetrachord	Note order	Step to next note (Number of steps)	Note name starting from Dügâh (Note: This is sometimes called "Starting from its original position" but it doesn't have to start there.)
Hüseynî pentachord	Uşşak tetrachord	1	K (8)	Dügâh
Hüseynî pentachord	Uşşak tetrachord	2	S (5)	Segâh
Hüseynî pentachord	Uşşak tetrachord	3	T (9)	Çârgâh
Hüseynî pentachord	Uşşak tetrachord	4	T (9)	Neva
Hüseynî pentachord	-	5	-	Hüseynî

== Makams that use the Uşşak tetrachord or Hüseynî pentachord ==
Name of Makam	Lower Çeşni	Higher Çeşni	Notes
Uşşak	Uşşak tetrachord	Buselik pentachord	This is the makam that the Uşşak tetrachord is named after.
Uzzal	Hicaz pentachord	Uşşak tetrachord	
Hüseynî	Hüseyni pentachord	Kürdi tetrachord	This is the makam that the Hüseynî pentachord is named after.
