= Uşşak (Turkish makam) =

Turkish music implementations

- Durak: Dügâh
- Güçlü: Neva
- Yeden: Rast
- Seyir: Ascending
- Lower Çeşni: Uşşak tetrachord
- Higher Çeşni: Buselik pentachord

Uşşak is the implementation of the Bayati scale in Turkish makam music. It can be approximated by using the 53 Tone Equal Temperament.

== Uşşak in 53-TET ==
Breakdown of the Uşşak Makam
Components	Note Name	Western Note	Steps to following note	Cents from Durak note	Function
Uşşak tetrachord	Dügâh	A	K (8)	0	Durak
Uşşak tetrachord	Segâh	B	S (5)	181.13	
Uşşak tetrachord	Çargah	C	T (9)	294.33	
Uşşak tetrachord	Neva	D	T (9)	498.11	Güçlü
Buselik pentachord	Neva	D	T (9)	498.11	Güçlü
Buselik pentachord	Hüseynî	E	B (4)	701.89	
Buselik pentachord	Acem	F	T (9)	792.45	
Buselik pentachord	Gerdaniye	G	T (9)	996.226	
Buselik pentachord	Muhayyer	A	-	1200.00	Tiz Durak

== Comparison with Western scales ==
Since the makam is most closely approximated with the 53-TET, it is impossible to directly tie it to 12-TET Western scales. However, using the 48-TET model, while worse than many other models in approximation, allows for such comparisons. (Note: This is because 48 is divisible by 12.)

The approximation of Rast ascending within 48-TET would be: (Note: denotes a quarter flat, 25 cents in this case. (One Holdrian Comma in 53-TET))

- Aeolian (2)

== Related makams ==
- Hüseynî, same notes as Uşşak, has the güçlü on the 5th note instead of the 4th.
- Rast, functions as a mode of Uşşak, when Uşşak's yeden (leading tone) is treated as a durak (tonic note). There can be a geçki (modulation) between the makams.
- Beyati
