= Acemli Rast =

- Durak: Rast
- Güçlü: Neva
- Yeden: Irak
- Seyir: Ascending
- Lower Çeşni: Rast pentachord
- Higher Çeşni: Buselik tetrachord

Acemli Rast ("Rast with Acem") is the implementation of the descending version of the Rast scale in Turkish makam music. It is in 53 Tone Equal Temperament.

Breakdown of the Acemli Rast Makam
Components	Note	Western Note	Steps to following note	Cents from Durak note	Function
Rast pentachord	Rast	G	T (9)	0	Durak
Rast pentachord	Dügâh	A	K (8)	203.77	
Rast pentachord	Segâh	B	S (5)	384.91	
Rast pentachord	Çargah	C	T (9)	498.11	
Rast pentachord	Neva	D	T (9)	701.89	Güçlü
Buselik tetrachord	Neva	D	T (9)	701.89	Güçlü
Buselik tetrachord	Hüseyni/Hisar	E	B (4)	905.66	
Buselik tetrachord	Acem	F	T (9)	996.23	The Yeden of this scale is Irak (F#), which is not octave equivalent with Acem.
Buselik tetrachord	Gerdaniye	G	-	1200.00	Tiz Durak

== Comparison with Western scales ==
Since the makam is based on 53-TET, it is impossible to directly tie it to 12-TET Western scales. However, using the 48-TET model, while worse than many other models in approximation, allows for such comparisons.^{α}

The approximation of Acemli Rast within 48-TET would be: Mixolydian(3).^{β}

== Notes ==
^α This is because 48 is divisible by 12.
^β denotes a quarter flat, 25 cents in this case. (One Holdrian Comma in 53-TET)
