= Maqam =

Maqam, makam, maqaam or maqām (plural maqāmāt) may refer to:

== Musical structures ==
- Arabic maqam, melodic modes in traditional Arabic music
  - Iraqi maqam, a genre of Arabic maqam music found in Iraq
- Persian maqam, a notion in Persian classical music
- Turkish makam, a Turkish system of melody types
  - List of Turkish makams
- Mukamlar, a Turkmen repertoire
- Muqam, a melody type from Uyghur culture
- Mugham, a music tradition of Azerbaijani cultures
- Shashmaqam ("six maqams"), a musical genre typical of Tajikistan and Uzbekistan
- Weekly maqam, melody types used in weekly prayer services of Sephardic Jewish culture

=== Individual maqamat ===
- Phrygian dominant scale, sometimes called the hijaz maqam
- Rast (maqam)

== Other uses ==
- Maqam (shrine), a tomb of a Muslim holy person
- Maqam (Sufism), any spiritual stage in the Sufi path
- Bandar-e Moqam, a village in Hormozgan Province, Iran
- Al-Maqam Mosque, Basra, Iraq
- MAQAM, a US-based production company specializing in Arabic and Middle Eastern media

== See also ==
- Maqamat (disambiguation)
- Muqaam, 2022 Indian film
