= Kürdî =

Scale in Turkish makam music

- Durak: Dügâh
- Güçlü: Neva
- Yeden: Rast
- Seyir: Ascending; Ascending-Descending
- Lower Çeşni: Kürdi tetrachord
- Higher Çeşni: Buselik pentachord
- Higher Extension: Kürdi tetrachord

Kürdî is a scale in Turkish makam music. It is in 53 Tone Equal Temperament.

== Kürdî in 53-TET ==
Breakdown of the Kürdî Makam
Components	Note		Western Note	Steps to following note	Cents from Durak note	Function
Kürdî tetrachord	Dügâh		A	B (4)	0	Durak
Kürdî tetrachord	Kürdî		B♭	T (9)	90.56	
Kürdî tetrachord	Çârgâh		C	T (9)	294.33	
Kürdî tetrachord	Neva	-	D	T (9)	498.11	Güçlü
Buselik pentachord	Neva	-	D	T (9)	498.11	Güçlü
Buselik pentachord	Hüseyni/Hisar		E	B (4)	701.89	
Buselik pentachord	Acem		F	T (9)	792.45	
Buselik pentachord	Gerdaniye		G	T (9)	996.23	
Buselik pentachord	Muhayyer		A	-	1200.00	Tiz Durak

The Kürdî makam has a higher extension, starting from Muhayyer, with the steps of the Kürdî tetrachord. The notes in that case are Muhayyer, Sümbüle, Tiz Çârgah, Tiz Neva.

This is equivalent to having a Buselik makam on top of Neva.

== Comparison with Western scales ==
Since the makam is based on 53-TET, it is impossible to directly tie it to 12-TET Western scales. However, using the 48-TET model, while worse than many other models in approximation, allows for such comparisons.

The approximation of Acemli Rast within 48-TET would be: Phrygian
