= Rast =

Rast or RAST may refer to:

== People ==
- Brian Rast (born 1981), American poker player
- Cam Rast (born 1970), American soccer player
- Camille Rast (born 1999), Swiss alpine skier
- Diana Rast (born 1970), Swiss racing cyclist
- Grégory Rast (born 1980), Swiss racing cyclist
- Holt Rast (1917–1988), American football player
- René Rast (born 1986), German racing driver
- Siim Rast (born 1988), Estonian powerlifter
- Rast, Prince (died 1531), Kazan prince

== Places ==
- Rast, Nevesinje, Bosnia and Herzegovina
- Rast, Iran
- Rast, Dolj, Romania
- Rast (Novi Pazar), Serbia

== Music ==
- Rast (maqam), a dastgāh (mode) in Persian music
- Rast (mode), a musical modal system in traditional mugham music
- Rast (Turkish makam)
- Rast (mugham) in Azerbaijani music
- Rast (Arabic maqam)

== Acronyms ==
- Radioallergosorbent test
- Radio Amateur Society of Thailand
- RAST system (Recovery Assist, Secure and Traverse), US Navy version of a device used for naval helicopter landings
- Royal Agricultural Society of Tasmania

== Other uses ==
- Rast (character), a character in the A Song of Ice and Fire novels
- Rast, an old Scandinavian unit of distance, see Scandinavian mile

== See also ==
- MG-RAST an open source web application server that suggests automatic phylogenetic and functional analysis of metagenomes
