= Rast (Turkish makam) =

- Durak: Rast
- Güçlü: Neva
- Yeden: Irak
- Seyir: Ascending
- Lower Çeşni: Rast pentachord
- Higher Çeşni: Rast tetrachord (Ascending) Buselik tetrachord (Descending)
- Lower Extension: Rast tetrachord

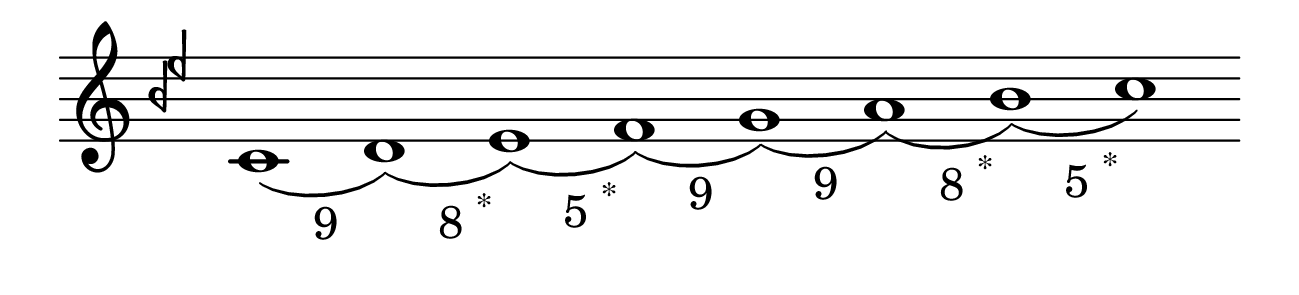
Makam Rast ascending in 53-TET

Rast is the implementation of the Rast scale in Turkish makam music. It is in 53 Tone Equal Temperament.

Rauf Yekta Bey's model places the Rast Makam as the gamme naturale of Turkish Classical Music and centers the theoretical approach around it. In the Arel Ezgi Uzdilek system, the scale centered in the theory became Çârgâh.

== Rast in 53-TET ==
Breakdown of the Rast Makam
Components		Note Name		Western Note		Steps to following note		Cents from Durak note		Function
Rast pentachord		Rast		G		T (9)		0		Durak
Rast pentachord		Dügâh		A		K (8)		203.77		
Rast pentachord		Segâh		B		S (5)		384.91		
Rast pentachord		Çargah		C		T (9)		498.11		
Rast pentachord		Neva	-	D		T (9)		701.89		Güçlü
Rast tetrachord (Ascending)	Buselik tetrachord (Descending)	Neva	-	D		T (9)		701.89		Güçlü
Rast tetrachord (Ascending)	Buselik tetrachord (Descending)	Hüseyni/Hisar		E		K (8)	B (4)	905.66		
Rast tetrachord (Ascending)	Buselik tetrachord (Descending)	Eviç (Asc.)	Acem (Desc.)	F# (Asc.)	F (Desc.)	S (5) (Asc.)	T (9) (Desc.)	1086.79 (Asc.)	996.23 (Desc.)	
Rast tetrachord (Ascending)	Buselik tetrachord (Descending)	Gerdaniye		G		-		1200.00		Tiz Durak

The Rast makam also has a Rast tetrachord extension in its lower registers, that is octave equivalent to the second çeşni in Rast ascending. The notes are: Yegâh, Hüseyni-Aşiran, Irak, ending with Rast.

== Comparison with Western scales ==
Since the makam is based on 53-TET, it is impossible to directly tie it to 12-TET Western scales. However, using the 48-TET model, while worse than many other models in approximation, allows for such comparisons. (Note: This is because 48 is divisible by 12.)

The approximation of Rast ascending within 48-TET would be: (Note: denotes a quarter flat, 25 cents in this case. (One Holdrian Comma in 53-TET))

- Major (3, 7)

While Rast descending would be:

- Mixolydian (3)

== Usage and understanding of Rast ==
=== Emotional effects of Rast ===
The Rast makam is understood to make listeners feel positive feelings, such as the following: Joy, relief, calmness, confidence, serenity and a sense of security.

=== Religious usage ===
Rast is one of the most prevalent makams used in reciting the Quran. It's also used during the ezan (daily call to prayer).

=== Songs that use the Rast scale ===
- Yine Bir Gülnihâl
- Açılan Bir Gül Gibi

== Related makams ==
- Acemli Rast (Rast with Acem), same as Rast descending

== See also ==
- Rast pitch class set
