= Nikriz =

Appeared Scale in Turkish makam music

- Durak: Rast
- Güçlü: Neva
- Yeden: Irak
- Seyir: Ascending
- Lower Çeşni: Rast pentachord
- Higher Çeşni: Rast tetrachord or Buselik tetrachord

Nikriz is the implementation of the Nikriz scale in Turkish makam music. It is in 53 Tone Equal Temperament.

== Nikriz in 53-TET ==
Breakdown of the Nikriz Makam
Components		Note		Western Note		Steps to following note		Cents from Durak note		Function
Nikriz pentachord		Rast		G		T (9)		0		Durak
Nikriz pentachord		Dügâh		A		S (5)		203.77		
Nikriz pentachord		Dik Kürdî		B		A (12)		316.97		
Nikriz pentachord		Nim Hicaz		C♯		S (5)		588.67		
Nikriz pentachord		Neva		D	-	T (9)		701.89		Güçlü
Rast tetrachord	Buselik tetrachord	Neva		D	-	T (9)		701.89		Güçlü
Rast tetrachord	Buselik tetrachord	Hüseyni/Hisar		E		K (8)	B (4)	905.66		
Rast tetrachord	Buselik tetrachord	Eviç	Acem	F♯	F	S (5)	T (9)	1086.79	996.23	
Rast tetrachord	Buselik tetrachord	Gerdaniye		G		-		1200.00		Tiz Durak

== Comparison with Western scales ==
Since the makam is based on 53-TET, it is impossible to directly tie it to 12-TET Western scales. However, using the 48-TET model, while worse than many other models in approximation, allows for such comparisons. (Note: This is because 48 is divisible by 12.)

The approximation of Nikriz within 48-TET would be:

- Ukrainian Dorian (3, ♯7 included along with 7)

== Usage ==
=== Songs that use the Nikriz scale ===
- Tanrıya Feryat
- Sevda Çiçeği [tr]
