= Ajam (maqam) =

Characteristic trichord of maqam ajam on B flat

‘Ajam (Turkish: Acem) is the name of a maqam (musical mode) in Arabic, Turkish, and related systems of music. Ajam (عجم) in this usage means "Persian".

The maqam Ajam is constructed of two Ajam trichords with "whole step-whole step" pitch intervals and spacing similar to the 1-2-3 (or 5-6-7) scale degrees found in an equal-tempered Western major scale (although the Ajam trichord's third scale degree may be tuned just slightly flat of an equal-tempered third, possibly to achieve a pure 5:4). Because most uses of these Ajam trichords place the next (fourth) scale step a halfstep above the last (third) scale step of the Ajam trichord, the result is essentially the same as the "whole step—whole step—half step" tetrachord construction of the Western major scale, and thus the maqam Ajam sounds generally the same as the major scale in Western music.

On F (notated C in Turkish music), Ajam is known as Jaharkah (in Turkish: Çârgâh, see also Chahargah (mode)).

== See also ==
- C major
