= Basit Suzinak =

Melodic system in Turkish makam music

- Durak: Rast
- Güçlü: Neva
- Yeden: Irak
- Seyir: Descending
- Lower Çeşni: Rast pentachord
- Higher Çeşni: Hicaz tetrachord

Basit Suzinak is a makam in Turkish makam music. It is in 53 Tone Equal Temperament.

== Basit Suzinak in 53-TET ==
Breakdown of the Basit Suzinak Makam
Components	Note	Western Note	Steps to following note	Cents from Durak note	Function
Rast pentachord	Rast	G	T (9)	0	Durak
Rast pentachord	Dügâh	A	K (8)	203.77	
Rast pentachord	Segâh	B	S (5)	384.91	
Rast pentachord	Çargah	C	T (9)	498.11	
Rast pentachord	Neva	D	S (5)	701.89	Güçlü
Hicaz tetrachord	Neva	D	S (5)	701.89	Güçlü
Hicaz tetrachord	Hüseyni/Hisar	E	A (13)	815.09	
Hicaz tetrachord	Eviç	F#	S (5)	1086.79	
Hicaz tetrachord	Gerdaniye	G	-	1200.00	Tiz Durak

== Comparison with Western scales ==
Since the makam is based on 53-TET, it is impossible to directly tie it to 12-TET Western scales. However, using the 48-TET model, while worse than many other models in approximation, allows for such comparisons.

The approximation of Basit Suzinak within 48-TET would be:

- Major (3, 6, 7)
- Harmonic Major (3, 6, 7)
