= Suphi Ezgi =

Turkish musicologist and composer

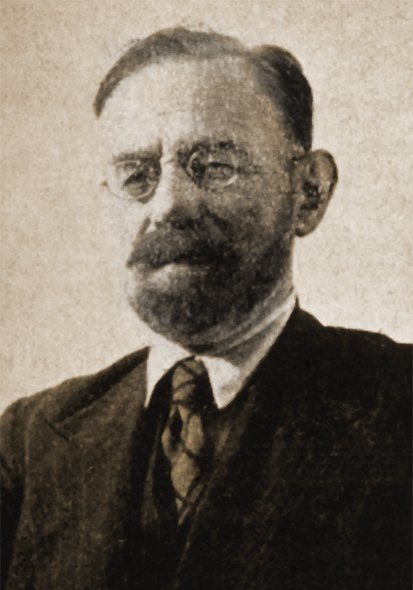
- Dr. Suphi Ezgi
- Born: Mehmet Suphi; 1869; Üsküdar, Istanbul, Ottoman Empire
- Died: 12 April 1962 (aged 92–93); Beykoz, Istanbul, Turkey
- Resting place: Zincirlikuyu Cemetery
- Education: Imperial Military Medicine School
- Occupation: Military physician
- Known for: Musicology studies in Turkish classical music

Mehmet Suphi Ezgi (1869 – 12 April 1962) was an Ottoman-born Turkish military physician who specialized in neurology, and a musician, musicologist and composer. He is best known for his studies of Ottoman classical music.

== Early life and education ==
Mehmet Suphi was born to İsmail Zühdü and his spouse Emine in Açıktürbe quarter of Üsküdar, Istanbul, then Ottoman Empire, in 1869. His family name "Ezgi", he took after the adoption of the Surname Law in 1934, means ""melody"in Türkish leanguage.His father was an accounting controller at the Ministry of Post and Telegraphs of the Ottoman Government. Following the secondary education, he attended the Imperial Military Medicine School. He graduated in 1892 in the rank of Captain.

Already at the age of five, he stood out while chanting in the neighborhood school. His father was an amateur singer and music instrument player, who arranged weekly musical meetings at home with music lover associates. Notable musicians of the era like Medeni Aziz Efendi, Hacı Arif Bey (1831-1885) and Kemani Tahsin joined the meetings. Mehmet Suphi attended the meetings in the beginning by singing. At the age of eleven, he received his first music lessons in violin from Kemani Tahsin, adjutant major of the Imperial Military Music Band. During his education of medicine at the boarding school, he visited Medeni Aziz Efendi on weekends for musical tuition.

== Military career ==
He was appointed military physician of neurology at the 1st Battalion of the 58th Regiment in Benghazi, Libya during the 1911–1912 Italo-Turkish War. He returned home in 1913. During World War I, he served in the rank of colonel as chief physician of the Hospital for Infectious Diseases (Ottoman Turkish: Emrâz-ı İntâniyye Hastahanesi) in Serviburnu, Beykoz, Istanbul.

With the beginning of the Turkish War of Independence, he moved to Anatolia, and was appointed chief physician of the Central Hospital of Ankara. He also served at many places as a physician. He retired from his military duty following the proclamation of Republic in 1923. He then worked for nine years as a public physician for the government and municipalities before he resigned.

== Music and musicology studies ==
Ezgi played the tanbur, as well as the violin and the viola d'amore, and blew the ney. By singing, he had a special own style. He learned Western European musical notation from Hacı Arif Bey, who was his father's music teacher for qanun and the Hamparsum notation of Ottoman classical music from Rauf Yekta (1871–1935). Later, he was able to dechipher the form called the "Mute Hamparsum notation". He received music lessons for about three years from Zekai Dede (1816–1885). He took lessons for viola d'amore and then for tanbur playing from Halim Efendi, Sheikh of the Rifa`i Order lodge in Kozyatağı. Among his music teachers are also Medeni Aziz Efendi (?–1895), with him he performed fasıl during his time at the Military Medicine School, Hüseyin Fahreddin Dede (1854–1911), Sheikh of the Mevlevi Order lodge in Bahariye, Kadıköy, from him he obtained a rich repertoire of religious music, and Edgar Manas Efendi (1875–1964), from him he took lessons in western music and harmony after 1911.

He composed more than 700 works in a great number of Turkish makams, however, he deemed only 165 of them worthy of publishing. His song Vatan Şarkısı ("Song of Homeland"), of which lyrics are written by poet Tevfik Fikret (1867–1915), was harmonized by Albert Lavignac (1846–1916), academic at the Conservatoire de Paris. 28 of his songs, which are compositions based on Ottoman poet Nedîm's (c. 1681–1730) odes, were included in the operetta Lale Devri ("Tulip period") by Musahibzade Celal in 1916. He also made some modifications in the Turkish music makams, and was music teacher, teaching the likes of Kemal Batanay (1893–1981), Ercüment Berker (1920–2009), Fahri Kopuz (1882–1968), Laika Karabey (1909 -1989), Mesut Cemil, Yılmaz Öztuna (1930-2012), Ahmet Çağan and Arif Sami Toker (1926-1997).

In 1932, he was appointed member of the Board for the Determination and Classification of Historical Turkish Music Works.(Turkish: Tarihî Türk Mûsikisi Eserlerini Tasnif ve Tesbit Heyeti) at Istanbul City Conservatory. It began a period in which the research and study of Turkish music gained significance importance in his life. His board mission lasted 15 years. His research works, some of the in collaboration with others, were published by the Conservatory of Istanbul between 1933 and 1953. His works of Tanbur Metodu (The Method of Tanbur") and Türk Musikisi Solfej Metodu ("Solfège Method of Turkish Music") were partly published in the Turkish Music Journal. In 1956, he published an article on the tempo in the Turkish Music in the Istanbul Institute Journal.

== Later years and death ==
In his last years, he lived as an anchorite in Beykoz, Istanbul. Ezgi died on 12 April 1962, and was buried at Zincirlikuyu Cemetery.

== Publications ==
1. Ezgi, Suphi, Nazarî, Amelî Türk Musikisi (I-V, İstanbul 1933–1953) ("Theoretical and Practical Turkish Music")
2. Ezgi Suphi et al., Türk Musikisi Klasiklerinden İlâhîler (I-III, İstanbul 1931–1933) ("From the Turkish Music Classics: Chants")
3. Ezgi Suphi et al., Türk Musikisi Klasiklerinden: Bektaşî Nefesleri (IV-V, İstanbul 1933) (" From the Turkish Music Classics: Bektashi Order Music")
4. Ezgi Suphi et al., Türk Musikisi Klasiklerinden: Mevlevî Âyinleri (VI-XVIII, İstanbul 1934–1939) ("From the Turkish Music Classics: Mevlevi Order Rituals ")
5. Ezgi, Suphi, Hâfız Mehmed Zekâî Dede Efendi Külliyâtı (I-III, İstanbul 1940–1943) ("Repertoire of Hafız Mehmed Zekaî Dede (1816–1885)")
6. Ezgi Suphi et al., Evc Bûselik, Mâhur Bûselik, Muhayyer Bûselik, Nevâ Bûselik, Bûselik, Hisâr Bûselik Fasılları (İstanbul 1943) ("Turkish Makam Buselik")
7. Ezgi, Suphi, Tanbûrî Mustafa Çavuş’un 36 Şarkısı (İstanbul 1948) ("36 Songs of Tanbûrî Mustafa Çavuş (1700–1770)")
8. Ezgi, Suphi, Türk Musikisi Klasiklerinden: Temcit-Na’t-Salât-Durak (İstanbul 1945) ("From the Turkish Music Classics: Sufism Music ")
