= Dastgah-e Rast-Panjgah =

Name of a scale in different musical traditions

Characteristic tetrachord of maqam rast, known as the rast tetrachord, commonly used in descending cadences

Rast Panjgah (or Rast; Persian: راست پنج گاه) is the name of a dastgah (musical mode) in Iranian music and of a maqam in Arabic and related systems of music.

Rast (راست) is a Persian word meaning "right" or "direct". Rast is regarded as the basic dastgah in Iranian music and later on was adopted in Arabic and Turkish makam music, in the same way as the major scale in Western music, though it is rather different from the major scale in detail. Rast features a half-flat third and a half-flat seventh scale degrees.

Middle eastern Sephardic Jews liken the word rast to "head" from the Hebrew word רֹאשׁ rosh. Therefore, they have a tradition of applying maqam rast to the prayers whenever they begin a new Torah book in the weekly Torah portions (this occurs approximately five times a year as there are five books in the Torah).

== Rast in different music traditions ==
- Rast (Arabic maqam)
- Rast (Turkish makam)
- Rast pitch class set
- Rast (mugham)
- Rast (Persian dastgah)

== See also ==
- List of makams
