= Arab tone system =

Musical tuning system of 24 tones per octave

The modern Arab tone system, or system of musical tuning, is based upon the theoretical division of the octave into twenty-four equal divisions or 24-tone equal temperament, the distance between each successive note being a quarter tone (50 cents). Each tone has its own name not repeated in different octaves, unlike systems featuring octave equivalency. The lowest tone is named yakah and is determined by the lowest pitch in the range of the singer. The next higher octave is nawa and the second tuti. However, from these twenty-four tones, seven are selected to produce a scale and thus the interval of a quarter tone is never used and the three-quarter tone or neutral second should be considered the characteristic interval.

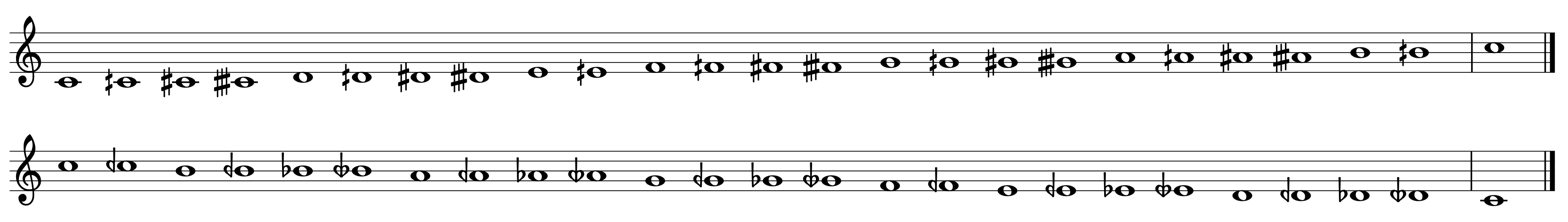
Quarter tone scale on C ascending and descending.

By contrast, in the European equally tempered scale, the octave is divided into twelve equal divisions, or exactly half as many as the Arab system. Thus, when Arabic music is written in European musical notation, a slashed or reversed flat sign is used to indicate a quarter-tone flat, a standard flat symbol (♭) for a half-tone flat, and a flat sign combined with a slashed or reversed flat sign for a three-quarter-tone flat, sharp with one vertical line for quarter sharps, standard sharp symbol (♯) for a half-step sharp, and a sharp with three vertical lines for a three-quarter-tone sharp. A two octave range starting with yakah arbitrarily on the G below middle C is used.

In practice, much fewer than twenty-four tones are used in a single performance. All twenty-four tones are individual pitches differentiated into a hierarchy of important pitches—pillars—which occur more frequently in the tone rows of traditional music and most often begin tone rows, and scattered less important or rarely occurring pitches (see tonality).

The specific notes used in a piece will be part of one of more than seventy modes or maqam rows named after characteristic tones that are rarely the first tone (unlike in European-influenced music theory where the tonic is listed first). The rows are heptatonic and constructed from augmented, major, neutral, and minor seconds. Many different but similar ratios are proposed for the frequency ratios of the tones of each row and performance practice, as of 1996, has not been investigated using electronic measurements.

The current tone system is derived from the work of Farabi (d. 950 CE) (heptatonic scales constructed from seconds), who used a 25-tone unequal scale (see tetrachord), and Mikha'il Mishaqah (1800–1888) who first presented the 24-tone equal-tempered division. Some strict traditionalists and musicians also use a 17-tone set, rejecting the 24-tone division as commercial.

== See also ==
- Jins
- Arabic maqam
