= Çârgâh =

- Durak: Kaba Çârgâh; Çârgâh
- Güçlü: Rast; Gerdaniye
- Yeden: Buselik; Tiz Buselik
- Seyir: Ascending or Descending-Ascending
- Lower Çeşni: Çârgâh pentachord
- Higher Çeşni: Çârgâh tetrachord

Çârgâh is the implementation of the Chahargah scale in Turkish makam music. Chargah makam was invented by Saddettin Arel so as to make an attempt to link traditional Turkish music with European scales. There are no traditional compositions in this makam, Hence it is not a true Turkish makam - see "The Music of Rumi" ISBN 978-0-9571665-0-9. It is in 53 Tone Equal Temperament. The makam is the central scale used within analysis in the Arel Ezgi Uzdilek system, this is not because this is a scale that's used a lot or otherwise central, but because it can be written without any accidentals.

== Çârgâh in 53-TET ==
Breakdown of the Çârgâh Makam
Components	Note		Western Note	Steps to following note	Cents from Durak note	Function
Çârgâh pentachord	Kaba Çârgâh	Çârgâh	C	T (9)	0	Durak
Çârgâh pentachord	Yegâh	Neva	D	T (9)	203.77	
Çârgâh pentachord	Hüseynî Aşiran	Hüseynî	E	B (4)	407.55	
Çârgâh pentachord	Acem Aşiran	Acem	F	T (9)	498.11	
Çârgâh pentachord	Rast	Gerdaniye	G	T (9)	701.89	Güçlü
Çârgâh tetrachord	Rast	Gerdaniye		T (9)	701.89	Güçlü
Çârgâh tetrachord	Dügâh	Muhayyer	A	T (9)	905.66	
Çârgâh tetrachord	Buselik	Tiz Buselik	B	B (4)	1009.43	
Çârgâh tetrachord	Çârgâh	Tiz Çârgâh	G	-	1200.00	Tiz Durak

== Comparison with Western scales ==
Since the makam is based on 53-TET, it is impossible to directly tie it to 12-TET Western scales. However, using the 48-TET model, while worse than many other models in approximation, allows for such comparisons.

The approximation of Çârgâh within 48-TET would be the Major Scale.

== See also ==
- Çârgâh pitch class set
