= Arabic maqam =

Mode in Arabic music

In traditional Arabic music, maqam (Arabic: مقام, romanized: maqām, literally "ascent"; pl. مقامات maqāmāt) is the system of melodic modes. The word maqam in Arabic means place, location or position. The Arabic maqam is a melody type. It is "a technique of improvisation" that defines the pitches, patterns, and development of a piece of music and is "unique to Arabic art music". There are 72 heptatonic tone rows or scales of maqamat. These are constructed from augmented, major, neutral, and minor seconds. Each maqam is built on a scale, and carries a tradition that defines its habitual phrases, important notes, melodic development and modulation. Both compositions and improvisations in traditional Arabic music are based on the maqam system. Maqamat can be realized with either vocal or instrumental music, and do not include a rhythmic component.

An essential factor in performance is that each maqam describes the "tonal-spatial factor" or set of musical notes and the relationships between them, including traditional patterns and development of melody, while the "rhythmic-temporal component" is "subjected to no definite organization". A maqam does not have an "established, regularly recurring bar scheme nor an unchanging meter. A certain rhythm does sometimes identify the style of a performer, but this is dependent upon their performance technique and is never characteristic of the maqam as such." The compositional or rather precompositional aspect of the maqam is the tonal-spatial organization, including the number of tone levels, and the improvisational aspect is the construction of the rhythmic-temporal scheme.

== Background ==
The designation maqam appeared for the first time in the treatises written in the fourteenth century by al-Sheikh al-Safadi and Abdulqadir al-Maraghi, and has since been used as a technical term in Arabic music. The maqam is a modal structure that characterizes the art of music of countries in North Africa, the Near East and Central Asia. Three main musical cultures belong to the maqam modal family: Arabic, Persian, and Turkish.

== Tuning system ==
The notes of a maqam are not always tuned in equal temperament, meaning that the frequency ratios of successive pitches are not necessarily identical. A maqam also determines other things, such as the tonic (starting note), the ending note, and the dominant note. It also determines which notes should be emphasized and which should not.

Most arabic maqamat are based on a musical scale of 7 notes that repeats at the octave (for instance, hijaz kar kurd does not repeat at the octave). Some maqamat have 2 or more alternative scales (e.g. Rast, Nahawand and Hijaz). Maqam scales in traditional Arabic music are microtonal, not based on a twelve-tone equal-tempered musical tuning system, as is the case in modern Western music. Most maqam scales include a perfect fifth or a perfect fourth (or both), and all octaves are perfect. The remaining notes in a maqam scale may or may not exactly land on semitones. For this reason maqam scales are mostly taught orally, and by extensive listening to the traditional Arabic music repertoire.

== Notation ==
Since accurately notating every possible microtonal interval is impractical, a simplified musical notation system was adopted in Arabic music at the turn of the 20th century. Starting with a chromatic scale, the octave is divided into 24 equal steps (24 equal temperament), where a quarter tone equals one-half of a semitone in a 12 tone equally-tempered scale. In this notation system all notes in a maqam are rounded to the nearest quarter tone.

This system of notation is not exact since it eliminates many details, but is very practical because it allows maqamat to be notated using standard Western notation. Quarter tones can be notated using half-flats ( or) or half-sharps. When transcribed with this notation system some maqam scales happen to include quarter tones, while others don't.

In practice, maqamat are not performed in all chromatic keys, and are more rigid to transpose than scales in Western music, primarily because of the technical limitations of Arabic instruments. For this reason, half-sharps rarely occur in maqam scales, and the most used half-flats are E, B and less frequently A.

== Intonation ==
The 24-tone system is entirely a notational convention and does not affect the actual precise intonation of the notes performed. Practicing Arab musicians, while using the nomenclature of the 24-tone system (half-flats and half-sharps), often still perform the finer microtonal details which have been passed down through oral tradition to this day.

Maqamat that do not include quarter tones (e.g. Nahawand, ‘Ajam) can be performed on equal-tempered instruments such as the piano, however such instruments cannot faithfully reproduce the microtonal details of the maqam scale. Maqamat can be faithfully performed either on fretless instruments (e.g. the oud or the violin), or on instruments that allow a sufficient degree of tunability and microtonal control (e.g. the nay, the qanun, or the clarinet). On fretted instruments with steel strings, microtonal control can be achieved by string bending, as when playing blues.

The exact intonation of every maqam changes with the historical period, as well as the geographical region (as is the case with linguistic accents, for example). For this reason, and because it is not common to notate precisely and accurately microtonal variations from a twelve-tone equal tempered scale, maqamat are mostly learned auditorally in practice.

=== Phases and central tones ===
Each passage consists of one or more phases that are sections "played on one tone or within one tonal area," and may take from seven to forty seconds to articulate. For example, a tone level centered on g:

The tonal levels, or axial pitches, begin in the lower register and gradually rise to the highest at the climax before descending again, for example (in European-influenced notation):

"When all possibilities of the musical structuring of such a tone level have been fully explored, the phase is complete."

==== Nucleus ====
The central tones of a maqam are created from two different intervals. The eleven central tones of the maqam used in the phase sequence example above may be reduced to three, which make up the "nucleus" of the maqam:

The tone rows of maqamat may be identical, such as maqam bayati and maqam 'ushshaq turki:

but be distinguished by different nuclei. Bayati is shown in the example above, while 'ushshaq turki is:

== Ajnas ==
Maqamat are made up of smaller sets of consecutive notes that have a very recognizable melody and convey a distinctive mood. Such a set is called jins (Arabic: جنس; pl. ajnās أجناس), meaning "gender" or "kind". In most cases, a jins is made up of four consecutive notes (tetrachord), although ajnas of three consecutive notes (trichord) or five consecutive notes (pentachord) also exist. In addition to other exceptional ajnas of undefined sizes.

Ajnas are the building blocks of a maqam. A maqam scale has a lower (or first) jins and an upper (or second) jins. In most cases maqams are classified into families or branches based on their lower jins. The upper jins may start on the ending note of the lower jins or on the note following that. In some cases the upper and lower ajnas may overlap. The starting note of the upper jins is called the dominant, and is the second most important note in that scale after the tonic. Maqam scales often include secondary ajnas that start on notes other than the tonic or the dominant. Secondary ajnas are highlighted in the course of modulation.

References on Arabic music theory often differ on the classification of ajnas. There is no consensus on a definitive list of all ajnas, their names or their sizes. However, the majority of references agree on the basic 9 ajnas, which also make up the main 9 maqam families. The following is the list of the basic 9 ajnas notated with Western standard notation (all notes are rounded to the nearest quarter tone):

‘Ajam (عجم) trichord, starting on B♭	Bayati (بياتي) tetrachord, starting on D	Hijaz (حجاز) tetrachord, starting on D
Kurd (كرد) tetrachord, starting on D	Nahawand (نهاوند) tetrachord, starting on C	Nikriz (نكريز) pentachord, starting on C
Rast (راست) tetrachord, starting on C	Saba (صبا) tetrachord, starting on D	Sikah (سيكاه) trichord, starting on E

(for more detail see Arabic Maqam Ajnas)

== Maqam families ==
Shad ‘Araban

Huzam

Nawa Athar
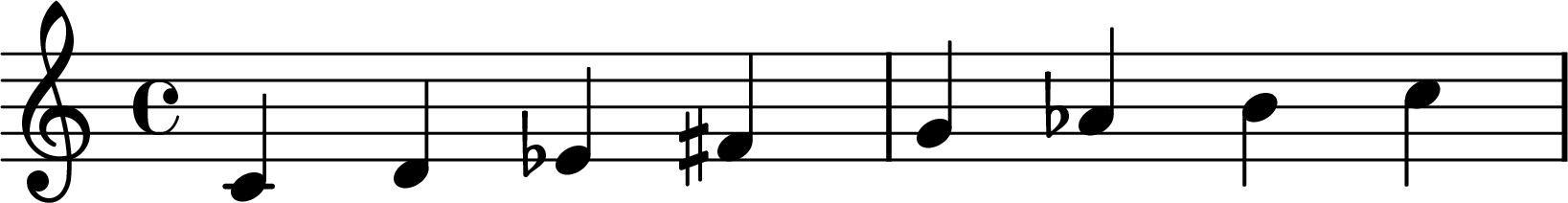

Rahat al-Arwah

Saba
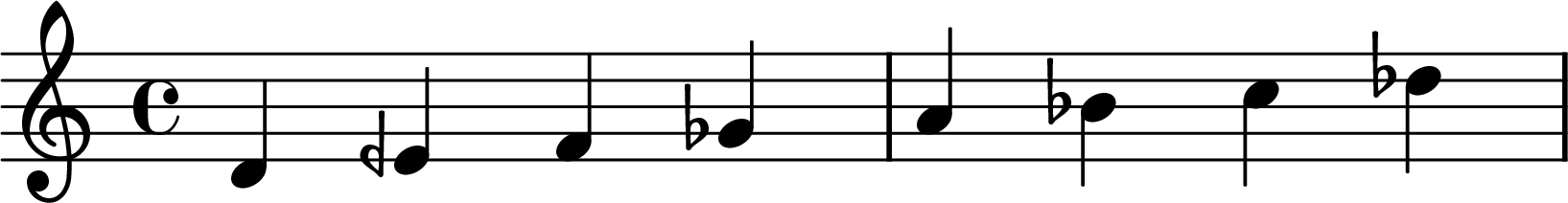

Bayati

Hijaz

Jiharkah

Husayni ‘Ushayran
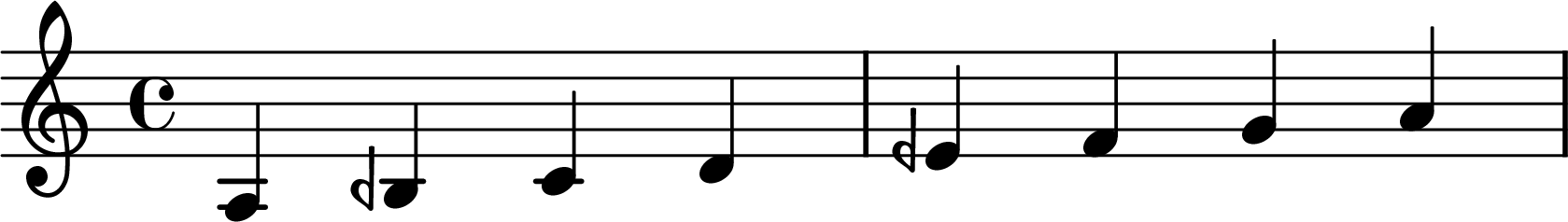

Rast

- ‘Ajam – Also the Major Scale ‘Ajam (عجم), Jiharkah (جهاركاه), Shawq Afza (شوق افزا or شوق أفزا), Ajam Ushayran (عجم عشيران)
- Bayati – Bayatayn (بیاتین), Bayati (بياتي), Bayati Shuri (بياتي شوري), Husayni (حسيني), Nahfat (نهفت), Huseini Ushayran (حسيني عشيران),
- Hijaz – Also The Phrygian Dominant Scale Hijaz (حجاز), Hijaz Kar (حجاز كار), Shad ‘Araban (شد عربان), Shahnaz (شهناز), Suzidil (سوزدل), Zanjaran (زنجران), Hijazain (حجازين)
- Kurd – Also the Phrygian Scale Kurd (كرد), Hijaz Kar Kurd (حجاز كار كرد), Lami (لامي)
- Nahawand – Also the Minor Scale Farahfaza (فرحفزا), Nahawand (نهاوند), Nahawand Murassah (نهاوند مرصّع or نهاوند مرصع), ‘Ushaq Masri (عشاق مصري), Sultani Yakah (سلطاني ياكاه)
- Nawa Athar – Athar Kurd (أثر كرد), Nawa Athar (نوى أثر or نوى اثر), Nikriz (نكريز), Hisar (حصار)
- Rast – Mahur (ماهور), Nairuz (نيروز), Rast (راست), Suznak (سوزناك), Yakah (يكاه)
- Saba – Saba (صبا), Saba Zamzam (صبا زمزم)
- Sikah – Bastah Nikar (بسته نكار), Huzam (هزام), ‘Iraq (عراق), Musta‘ar (مستعار), Rahat al-Arwah (راحة الأرواح), Sikah (سيكاه), Sikah Baladi (سيكاه بلدي)

== Emotional content ==
It is sometimes said that each maqam evokes a specific emotion or set of emotions determined by the tone row and the nucleus, with different maqams sharing the same tone row but differing in nucleus and thus emotion. Maqam Rast is said to evoke pride, power, and soundness of mind. Maqam Bayati: vitality, joy, and femininity. Sikah: love. Saba: sadness and pain. Hijaz: distant desert.

In an experiment where maqam Saba was played to an equal number of Arabs and non-Arabs who were asked to record their emotions in concentric circles with the weakest emotions in the outer circles, Arab subjects reported experiencing Saba as "sad", "tragic", and "lamenting", while only 48 percent of the non-Arabs described it thus with 28 percent of non-Arabs describing feelings such as "seriousness", "longing", and tension", and 6 percent experienced feelings such as "happy", "active", and "very lively" and 10 percent identified no feelings.

These emotions are said to be evoked in part through change in the size of an interval during a maqam presentation. Maqam Saba, for example, contains in its first four notes, D, E, F, and G♭, two medium seconds one larger (160 cents) and one smaller (140 cents) than a three quarter tone, and a minor second (95 cents). Further, E and G♭ may vary slightly, said to cause a "sad" or "sensitive" mood.

Generally speaking, each maqam is said to evoke a different emotion in the listener. At a more basic level, each jins is claimed to convey a different mood or color. For this reason maqams of the same family are said to share a common mood since they start with the same jins. There is no consensus on exactly what the mood of each maqam or jins is. Some references describe maqam moods using very vague and subjective terminology (e.g. maqams evoking 'love', 'femininity', 'pride' or 'distant desert'). However, there has not been any serious research using scientific methodology on a diverse sample of listeners (whether Arab or non-Arab) proving that they feel the same emotion when hearing the same maqam.

Attempting the same exercise in more recent tonal classical music would mean relating a mood to the major and minor modes. In that case there is some consensus that the minor scale is "sadder" and the major scale is "happier".

== Modulation ==
Modulation is a technique used during the melodic development of a maqam. In simple terms it means changing from one maqam to another (compatible or closely related) maqam. This involves using a new musical scale. A long musical piece can modulate over many maqamat but usually ends with the starting maqam (in rare cases the purpose of the modulation is to actually end with a new maqam). A more subtle form of modulation within the same maqam is to shift the emphasis from one jins to another so as to imply a new maqam.

Modulation adds a lot of interest to the music, and is present in almost every maqam-based melody. Modulations that are pleasing to the ear are created by adhering to compatible combinations of ajnas and maqamat long established in traditional Arabic music. Although such combinations are often documented in musical references, most experienced musicians learn them by extensive listening.

== Influence around the world ==
During the Islamic golden age this system influenced musical systems in various places. An example is the influence it had on music in the Iberian peninsula during Muslim rule of Al-Andalus. Sephardic Jewish liturgy also follows the maqam system. The weekly maqam is chosen by the cantor based on the emotional state of the congregation or the weekly Torah reading. This variation is called the Weekly Maqam. There is also a notable influence of the Arabic maqam on the music of Sicily.

== See also ==
- Ali Merdan
- Harmonic minor
- Melisma
- Mujawwad
- Persian dastgah
- Pizmonim
- Raga
- Taqsim
- The Iraqi Maqam
- The Weekly Maqam
- Turkish makam
