= Jins =

Arabic music term

Ajnas (the equivalent of modern-day modes) in old Persian traditional music. Originally by Abd al-Qadir Maraghi, as published in the book by Farhad Fakhreddini.

In traditional Arabic music theory, a jins (Arabic: جنس, pl. أجناس, ajnās) is a set of three, four, or five stepwise pitches used to build an Arabic maqam, or melodic mode. They correspond to the English terms trichord, tetrachord, and pentachord. A maqam is made up of two or more ajnas.

== Etymology ==
The Arabic word جنس (jins) probably derives from the Greek word γένος (génos) or else from the related Latin word genus, either way from the same Proto-Indo-European root. The basic meaning is that of a kind, family, or race. The same Arabic word is also used to mean genus in biology, and gender.

== Meaning of a jins ==
Traditional music theory texts tend to describe a jins as a concrete set of pitches (in many cases a set of exactly four pitches, i.e. a tetrachord), and they are often quick to give mathematically precise intervals for the ideal version of each jins. Their authors were probably influenced by the writings of ancient Greek music theorists going back to Pythagoras (see Tetrachord and Genus (music)), and their intention had more to do with deriving ideal musical scales from basic mathematical principles rather than simply using mathematical tools to describe scales that are basically products of human culture.

A more modern approach is to accept performance practice as the arbiter of truth, and to use the concept of ajnas to describe that practice as naturally and faithfully as possible. This results in several deviations from the traditional concept of a jins that are useful:

- A jins need not contain exactly 4 pitches, but could contain 3, 5, or even greater numbers of pitches (depending on how membership in the jins is defined).
- The intervals with a jins are not mathematically fixed to one ideal form, because different regional styles and even different individual performers can use differently tuned intervals as part of their artistic expression.
- A jins is not only a set of pitches, but can include at least two kinds of special, distinguished pitches: the tonic (the "home" or "resting place" of melodic phrases), and the ghammaz (an intermediate resting point and also often a point of modulation to other ajnas). Traditionally the tonic is always considered to be the lowest pitch in the jins, but there is no convincing reason for this and sometimes a clearer analysis can be made in terms of ajnas that go below the tonic as well.
- The realm of melodic influence of a jins often extends above or below the proper notes of the jins, especially to the "leading tone" or pitch immediately below the tonic, which is commonly used in melodies and lies a particular interval below the tonic for each jins.
- In addition to all that, each jins has certain melodic fragments that are more expected or traditional in the idiom of Arabic music, and substantially deviating from them results in melodies that are rarer or more experimental. In other words, each jins comes with its own "vocabulary" of phrases that musicians draw from to build idiomatic melodies.

== Standard tonics and transposition ==
A jins is defined and recognized by its intervals, so it can be transposed to a different absolute pitch and still be considered the same jins. Unlike Western major and minor scales, however, ajnas are not (in practice) transposed to more than a handful of appropriate tonic pitches. The reason for this is partly tradition and partly because of the ergonomics and mechanical capabilities of different instruments. For example, players of stringed instruments such as the oud or violin generally prefer the tonic and ghammaz of a jins to be on open strings. An even more obvious example is the "Arabized" accordion, which may be equipped with only a limited set of quarter-tone notes, such as E half-flat, A half-flat, and B half-flat — this greatly restricts the keys in which the non-semitonal ajnas can be played.

The ajnas below are presented on their "standard" tonics, which are the traditional versions first taught to music students. In some cases the jins actually shares its name with the name of the pitch in the historic 24-tone Arab tone system, for example "Rast" is both the name of a jins and the name of the note C, which is its standard tonic (jins Rast also frequently starts on F or G, but those are considered alternative tonics).

== Most common ajnas ==
A mnemonic device used by some music students to remember the names of the eight most common ajnas (or corresponding maqamat) is the Arabic phrase صنع بسحرك (ṣuniʿa bi-siḥirka) which means "made with your magic" and has eight Arabic letters, one for each jins. In this order they are Ṣabā (صبا), Nahāwand (نهاوند), ʿAjam (عجم), Bayātī (بياتي), Sīkāh (سيكاه), Ḥijāz (حجاز), Rāst (راست), and Kurd (كرد).

=== ʿAjam ===
Jins ʿAjam on C. The white notes are the tonic (C) and the ghammaz (G).

Jins ʿAjam is a pentachord spanning a perfect fifth and is similar to the bottom part of a major scale.

=== Bayati ===
Jins Bayati on D. The flat-with-slash symbol lowers the pitch by a "quarter tone", which is conceptually half of a semitone or 50 cents, but in practice none of the pitches need be tuned to equal temperament at all.

Jins Bayati is a tetrachord spanning a perfect fourth. There are two neutral seconds above the tonic, so this jins is not playable in 12 equal temperament, even approximately.

=== Hijaz ===
Jins Hijaz on D

Jins Hijaz is a tetrachord spanning a perfect fourth. It has a distinctive large step (an augmented second) between the second and third pitches. Though a version of jins Hijaz exists in equal temperament, many sources claim this is an inferior rendering and give it the disparaging name "Piano Hijaz". In particular, the D-E♭ and F♯-G intervals are usually larger than equal-tempered semitones, making the E♭-F♯ augmented second significantly smaller than a minor third.

=== Kurd ===
Jins Kurd on D

Jins Kurd is a tetrachord spanning a perfect fourth. It resembles the bottom half of the Phrygian mode in Western music.

=== Nahawand ===
Jins Nahawand on C

Jins Nahawand is a tetrachord spanning a perfect fourth. It resembles the bottom half of a minor scale.

=== Saba ===
Jins Saba on D. The white notes are the tonic (D) and two candidates for the role of ghammaz: the pitch of secondary melodic emphasis (F) and the most common modulation point to other ajnas (B♭).

Jins Saba is usually defined as a tetrachord spanning an interval significantly less than a perfect fourth. It is similar to Bayati with a flattened fourth pitch. Unlike many other ajnas, there is broad agreement about the emotional character of jins Saba: its mood is one of intense distress or yearning.

=== Sikah ===
Jins Sikah on E half-flat.

Jins Sikah is a trichord spanning a neutral third. Sikah is unique in that its tonic is a "quarter-tone" pitch (this distinction between "quarter-tone" vs "semitonal" pitches is not merely an artifact of equal-temperament hegemony; one practical difference between them is that a "quarter-tone" pitch will never be found on an open string of a stringed instrument such as the oud or violin). This jins can also start on A half-flat or B half-flat, but it will never start on a semitonal or open-string note such as C, D, F, G, A...

=== Rast ===
Jins Rast on C

Jins Rast is a pentachord spanning a perfect fifth. The third pitch is a neutral third above the tonic, and its specific tuning varies among different regional traditions. In much of the Arab world its tuning is somewhere generally near an actual quarter-tone (350 cents) - with local variations - while in the corresponding Turkish scales also called "rast" it is much closer to a major third (e.g. 380 cents).

== See also ==
- Arabic maqam
- Jins/ajnas in Arabic music
