= Maqamat =

Maqamat may have the following meanings:

- Plural for Maqam (disambiguation)
- Plural for Maqama, an Arabic literary tradition
- Maqamat Badi' az-Zaman al-Hamadhani, an Arabic collection of stories from the 9th century
