= List of notes in Turkish makam theory =

This is a list of notes in Turkish makam theory, a system of melody types used in Turkish classical and folk music:

Notes: Kaba means that a note is in the lower register and Tiz means that it's in the higher register. Nim means that a note is slightly lower, Dik means that a note is slightly higher.

Comma difference from Çargah	1st octave	2nd octave	3rd octave	Representation with sharps	Representation with Flats	Notes
0	Kaba Çargâh	Çargâh	Tiz Çargâh	C	C	
4	Kaba Nim Hicâz	Nim Hicâz	Tiz Nim Hicâz	C♯	D♭	
5	Kaba Hicâz	Hicâz	Tiz Hicâz	C	D	
8	Kaba Dik Hicâz	Dik Hicâz	Tiz Dik Hicâz	C	D	Not used in practice.
9	Yegâh	Neva	Tiz Neva	D	D	
13	Kaba Nim Hisâr	Nim Hisâr	Tiz Nim Hisâr	D♯	E♭	
14	Kaba Hisâr	Hisâr	Tiz Hisâr	D	E	
17	Kaba Dik Hisâr	Dik Hisâr	Tiz Dik Hisâr	D	E	
18	Hüseynî Aşiran	Hüseynî	Tiz Hüseynî	E	E	
22	Acem Aşiran	Acem	Tiz Acem	F	F	
23	Dik Acem Aşiran	Dik Acem	Tiz Dik Acem	F	G	Not used in practice.
26	Irak	Eviç	Tiz Eviç	F♯	G♭	
27	Geveşt	Mahur	Tiz Mahur	F	G	
30	Dik Geveşt	Dik Mahur	Tiz Dik Mahur	F	G	Not used in practice.
31	Rast	Gerdaniye	Tiz Gerdaniye	G	G	
35	Nim Zirgüle	Nim Şehnaz	Tiz Nim Şehnaz	G♯	A♭	
36	Zirgüle	Şehnaz	Tiz Şehnaz	G	A	
39	Dik Zirgüle	Dik Şehnaz	Tiz Dik Şehnaz	G	A	
40	Dügâh	Muhayyer	Tiz Muhayyer	A	A	
44	Kürdî	Sümbüle	Tiz Sümbüle	A♯	B♭	
45	Dik Kürdî	Dik Sümbüle	Tiz Dik Sümbüle	A	B	
48	Segâh	Tiz Segâh	Tiz Tiz Segâh	A	B	
49	Buselik	Tiz Buselik	Tiz Tiz Buselik	B	B	
52	Dik Buselik	Tiz Dik Buselik	Tiz Tiz Dik Buselik	-	C	Not used in practice.

== Usage frequency ==
While technically in the list of notes, some of these notes are either not used, or very rarely used in practice.
