= Saba (music) =

Arabic and Turkish musical scale

Oud and Goblet drum Saba music

Saba (Arabic: صبا, Turkish: Saba or Sabâ, Turkmen: sabah) is a kind of musical scale used in both Arabic music and Turkish classical music. This article covers both the Arabic jins and maqam called "Saba" as well as the similar Turkish makam of the same name.

In either tradition, the first three steps above the tonic of Saba are all rather small, so that the fourth pitch is noticeably less than a perfect fourth above the tonic. This distinguishes it from most other scales. Saba is often associated with troubled, distressed, or yearning emotions.

== Etymology ==
Saba (Arabic: صبا) is an Arabic word that means "yearning" and also refers to a type of wind, specifically "East Wind." It has been translated as "zephyr" or "early morning breeze." In Turkish, sabah means "morning," and the morning adhan is often called in makam Saba. It is possible the connection with the Turkish word for morning is simply folk etymology and the name of the scale comes from Arabic.

== Arabic music ==
In Arabic musical tradition, Saba is both a jins (genus) and a maqam family based on that jins, which has only one member: Maqam Saba.

=== Jins ===
Jins Saba on D. Flat-with-slash means approximately half of a normal flat. The white notes are the tonic (D) and two candidates for the role of ghammaz: the pitch of secondary melodic emphasis (F) and the most common modulation point to other ajnas (B♭).

Jins Saba is traditionally defined as a tetrachord spanning an interval significantly less than a perfect fourth. It is among the 8 or 9 standard ajnas of Arabic music, but it is unusual among ajnas in that there is only one maqam built on it, and it doesn't serve as a main secondary jins of any other maqamat (although it often replaces Jins Bayati as a colorful alteration).

Saba is not playable on equal-tempered Western instruments because of the second degree, which is conceptually a "quarter tone" and not sufficiently well approximated by either a minor second or a major second above the tonic.

Jins Saba lacks a single, well-defined ghammaz because the secondary center of melodic emphasis is usually pitch 3, while the pivot for modulating to other ajnas is instead pitch 6 (even though this pitch is outside the traditional Saba tetrachord). Both of these pitches therefore play some roles of the ghammaz.

=== Maqam ===
Maqam Saba on D. Both ways to continue the scale above B♭ — jins 'Ajam and jins Nikriz — are shown.

Maqam Saba has Jins Saba on the tonic and continues upwards from there. Pieces in Maqam Saba usually end by resolving down to the Saba tonic (shown as D here).

The next higher area of melodic concentration is jins Hijaz on 3. Some authors note that this is not a usual Hijaz because (1) in comparison to typical Hijaz, pitch 3 is tonicized less, and (2) the precise intonation of the intervals is different from normal Hijaz. Nevertheless, this can be thought of as "jins Hijaz on 3" for most practical purposes. It partially overlaps jins Saba on 1.

Starting from the 6th degree there are two common options: jins 'Ajam on 6 and jins Nikriz on 6. Jins 'Ajam may make more sense to Western ears because its third note is the same as the octave of the Saba tonic. Nikriz on 6, however, is an important and well-known part of Maqam Saba as well, and neither its 3rd nor 4rd degrees (overall degrees 8 and 9) form perfect octaves with lower pitches of the scale.

== Turkish music ==
Makam Saba on A. Reversed flat lowers the pitch by 1 koma and flat-with-slash lowers the pitch by 4 komas. In Turkish music theory a whole tone is equivalent to 9 komas. White notes indicate tonic (durak) and dominant (güçlü).

Saba is also a Turkish makam. It is usually notated with the tonic of A (Dügâh). The güçlü (dominant) is then C, the third degree of the scale - compare this to the Arabic version where the third degree is also the main note of melodic emphasis other than the tonic. The pitches above C form a Hicaz pentachord.

Multiple sources agree that the fourth degree, the pitch called Hicaz, is in practice played somewhat sharper than notated.
