= Precomposition =

In music, precomposition are decisions which a composer decides upon before or while beginning to create a composition. These limits may be given to the composer, such as the length or style needed, or entirely decided by the composer.

Precompositional decisions may also include which key, scale, musical form, style, genre, or idiom in which to write, to use techniques such as the twelve tone technique, serialism, or not to (consciously) use a system at all. Other examples may include isorhythm, ostinato, passacaglia, chaconne, rhythms, or chord progression.

Precompositional decisions do not necessarily, and almost always do not, preclude compositional decisions, and may actually allow the initial consideration of the choices to be made. One might say that, "thus, while it liberates imagination as to what the world may be, it refuses to legislate as to what the world is" (Bertrand Russell, Our Knowledge of the External World). Thus precompositional decisions do not necessarily ease the compositional choices.

On the other hand, the concept of precompositional decisions is unclear as it is often impossible to determine which decisions occur before or during a composition.
