= Nikriz pitch class set =

Five notes defining the Nikriz scale

In Turkish classical music, the Nikriz pitch class set is a set of scales that are named after the Nikriz makam. For Nikriz, there is only the pentachord, as the 4th is raised. The Nikriz pentachord is the same as putting the 53-TET equivalent of a whole step in the beginning of the Hicaz tetrachord.

== Nikriz pentachord in 53-TET ==
The intervals of the Nikriz pentachord within 53 Tone Equal Temperament are given in the table:

Nikriz pitch class set
Pentachord	Tetrachord	Note order	Step to next note (Number of steps)	Note name starting from Rast
Nikriz pentachord	-	1	T (9)	Rast
Nikriz pentachord	Hicaz tetrachord (starting from Dügâh)	2	S (5)	Dügâh
Nikriz pentachord	Hicaz tetrachord (starting from Dügâh)	3	A (12)	Dik Kürdî
Nikriz pentachord	Hicaz tetrachord (starting from Dügâh)	4	S (5)	Nim Hicaz
Nikriz pentachord	Hicaz tetrachord (starting from Dügâh)	5	-	Neva

== Makams that use the Nikriz pentachord ==
Name of Makam	Lower Çeşni	Higher Çeşni		Notes
Nikriz	Nikriz pentachord	Rast tetrachord	Buselik tetrachord	
Neveser	Nikriz pentachord	Hicaz tetrachord		
