= Çârgâh pitch class set =

Five notes defining the Buselik scale

In Turkish classical music, the Çârgâh pitch class set is a set of scales that are named after Çârgâh, a Turkish makam. For Çârgâh, there is the Çârgâh tetrachord and the Çârgâh pentachord.

== Buselik pentachord in 53-TET ==
The intervals of the Buselik pentachord and Buselik tetrachord within 53 Tone Equal Temperament are given in the table:

Çârgâh pitch class set
Pentachord	Tetrachord	Note order	Step to next note (Number of steps)	Note name starting from Çârgâh (Note: This is sometimes called "Starting from its original position" but it doesn't have to start there.)
Çârgâh pentachord	Çârgâh tetrachord (starting from Çârgâh)	1	T (9)	Çârgâh
Çârgâh pentachord	Çârgâh tetrachord (starting from Çârgâh)	2	T (9)	Neva
Çârgâh pentachord	Çârgâh tetrachord (starting from Çârgâh)	3	B (4)	Hüseynî
Çârgâh pentachord	Çârgâh tetrachord (starting from Çârgâh)	4	T (9)	Acem
Çârgâh pentachord	-	5	-	Gerdaniye

== Makams that use the Çârgâh pentachord or Çârgâh tetrachord ==
Name of Makam	Lower Çeşni	Higher Çeşni	Notes
Çârgâh	Çârgâh pentachord	Çârgâh tetrachord	This is the makam that the pitch class set is named after.
