= Rast (Arabic maqam) =

Maqam in Arabic music

Rast ascending in 24-TET. (Arabic)

Rast is the implementation of the Rast maqam in Arabic maqam theory. Its formal account is in 24 Tone Equal Temperament, but according to some musicologists, there are slight variations in practice. Rast is similar to a major scale, with the exceptions of half-flat third and seventh degrees in the ascent.

== Maqam Rast ascending in 24-TET ==
The Rast ascending scale consists of the combination of two Rast tetrachords:

- 1: Tonic note
- 2: Major second
- 3: Neutral third
- 4: Perfect Fourth
- 5: Perfect Fifth
- 6: Major Sixth
- 7: Neutral Seventh (In Rast descending, it is Minor Seventh instead)
- 8: Octave

== Structure ==
The pitches of maqam Rast are C, D, E half-flat, F, G, A, B half-flat. The descent typically uses B flat.

Maqam Rast is composed of jins rast on C (C, D, E half-flat, F, G) and jins rast on G (G, A, B half-flat, C)
