= Chahargah (mode) =

Musical modal system in traditional mugham music

Dastgāh-e Chahārgāh (Persian: دستگاه چهارگاه; Azerbaijani: Çahargah) is a musical modal system in traditional mugham music and one of the seven Dastgāhs of Persian Music. Classically, Persian Music is organized into seven Dastgāhs and five Āvāzes, however from a merely technical point of view, one can consider them as an ensemble of 12 Dastgāhs.

This is the fifth and the longest mode according to the amount of sounds. It consists of eleven membranes.

Three tetra-chords are amalgamated with two methods. The first and the second tetra-chords are amalgamated with the first method. The second and the third tetra-chords are amalgamated with different method. Tetra-chords are 0.5+1.5+0.5 tone structural. Chahargah mode is represented in two kinds in Uzeyir Hajibeyov’s composition. It creates at listener excitement and passion.

Subgenres of Chahargah are: Bardasht, Maye, Bali-Kabutar, Djovhari, Basta-Nigar, Hisar, Mualif, Garra, Mukhalif, Ouj Mukhalif, Maghlub, Mansuriyya, Uzzal.

== See also ==
- Çârgâh
