= Rauf Yekta =

Turkish musician

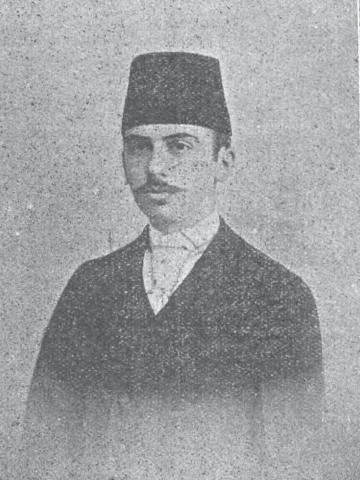
Rauf Yekta Bey

Rauf Yekta Bey (27 March 1871 – 8 January 1935) was a Turkish musician, musicologist and writer on music. In addition, he was a government official, a Mevlevi dervish and played the Turkish ney, an end-blown flute.

== Biography ==
Rauf Yekta was born on 27 March 1871, in the Aksaray area of Istanbul to Ahmed Arif Bey. He was named Mehmed Rauf, but adopted Rauf Yekta as a pen name. Apart from his native Turkish, he spoke French, Arabic and Persian. He was married to Zeliha, and they had two sons and two daughters.

== Contribution to the theory of Turkish classical music ==
Yekta wrote "La Musique Turque", the first modern account of Turkish classical music in a Western language, published in 1922 in a French encyclopedia of music. His emphasis in this article was on musical intervals, modes and rhythms, and he quoted some 73 musical examples.

For this encyclopaedia article, he introduced a modified European notation system. His notation system used a variety of accidentals to express the microtonal inflections necessary for the Turkish modal system. It was closer to the original sounds of the music, which he learned through the orally transmitted learning from a master; this system was called meşk. "La Musique Turque" was intended to introduce the tonal system of Turkish music to Europeans. For this purpose he composed 30 short examples of seyirs (musical descriptions of a particular mode or Turkish makam) using 30 of the well-known makams. He described the origins of the Turkish music system as originating from ancient Greek musical theory, especially the one translated into Arabic by Al Farabi.

Yekta researched Turkish music deeper than anyone before him in Turkey. In particular, he recommended that European musicologists consider reforming European music theory to include the wide tonal range of Turkish music. One of his quotes were: "Surely European ears can enjoy more than major and minor scales? It’s time for the West to create a general theory of music and enrich their harmonies with the precious treasure preserved by the Oriental ancestors." His notational system was the one used for the official publications of the Istanbul Conservatory during the 1920s and 1930s. In 1932, Yekta participated in the Cairo Congress of Arab Music, where he rejected the 24-tone equal-tempered scale for Arabic music that had been proposed by other musicologists.

However, the cultural policy in Turkey did not follow Yekta's recommendation. The meşk system was abolished and musical academies for Western classical music were introduced. The present-day theory of Turkish classical music is the result of a collaboration between Suphi Ezgi (1869–1962) and H. Sadettin Arel who both studied Western music and ignored the Rauf Yekta system. The Ezgi-Arel system resulted in the loss of many vital notes in the music theory and the original character of the ancient Turkish music sound.

Yekta performed as a neyzen playing the ney (end-blown flute) at Mevlevi ceremonies. He was a dervish at the Yenikapi Tekke in Istanbul.
