= Rast pitch class set =

The Rast pitch class set is a set of scales that are named after the Rast makam. For Rast, there is the Rast tetrachord and Rast pentachord.

It is used as a Çeşni in many makams.

== Rast tetrachord and pentachord in 53-TET ==
The intervals of the Rast tetrachord and Rast pentachord within 53 Tone Equal Temperament are given in the table:

Rast pitch class set
| Pentachord | Tetrachord | Note order | Step to next note (Number of steps) | Note name starting from Rast |
|---|---|---|---|---|
| Rast pentachord | Rast tetrachord | 1 | T (9) | Rast |
| Rast pentachord | Rast tetrachord | 2 | K (8) | Dügâh |
| Rast pentachord | Rast tetrachord | 3 | S (5) | Segâh |
| Rast pentachord | Rast tetrachord | 4 | T (9) (Only for pentachord) | Çârgâh |
| Rast pentachord | - | 5 | - | Neva |

== Makams that use the Rast pentachord or Rast tetrachord ==
| Name of Makam | Lower Çeşni | Higher Çeşni | | Notes |
|---|---|---|---|---|
| Rast Ascending | Rast pentachord | Rast tetrachord | | |
| Acemli Rast (Same as Rast Descending) | Rast pentachord | Buselik tetrachord | | |
| Basit Suzinak | Rast pentachord | Hicaz tetrachord | | |
| Nikriz | Nikriz pentachord | Rast tetrachord | Buselik tetrachord | |

== See also ==
- Rast (Turkish makam)
