= Kürdî pitch class set =

Five notes defining the Buselik scale

In Turkish classical music, the Kürdî pitch class set is a set of scales that are named after the Kürdî makam. For Kürdî, there is the Kürdî tetrachord and the Kürdî pentachord.

== Kürdî pentachord in 53-TET ==
The intervals of the Kürdî pentachord and Kürdî tetrachord within 53 Tone Equal Temperament are given in the table:

Kürdî pitch class set
Pentachord	Tetrachord	Note order	Step to next note (Number of steps)	Note name starting from Dügâh (Note: This is sometimes called "Starting from its original position" but it doesn't have to start there.)
Kürdî pentachord	Kürdî tetrachord	1	B (4)	Dügâh
Kürdî pentachord	Kürdî tetrachord	2	T (9)	Kürdî
Kürdî pentachord	Kürdî tetrachord	3	T (9)	Çârgâh
Kürdî pentachord	Kürdî tetrachord	4	T (9)	Neva
Kürdî pentachord	-	5	-	Hüseynî

== Makams that use the Kürdî pentachord or Kürdî tetrachord ==
Name of Makam	Lower Çeşni	Higher Çeşni	Higher Extension	Notes
Kürdî	Kürdî tetrachord	Buselik pentachord	Kürdî tetrachord	This is the makam that the pitch class set is named after.
Buselik	Buselik pentachord	Kürdî tetrachord		This scale exists within Kürdî if the Higher Çeşni and Higher Extension are put on top of each other.
