= Rast (mugham) =

Musical modal system in traditional mugham music

Rast (Azerbaijani: Rast) is a musical modal system in traditional mugham music.

This is the first mode of main modes in mugham which kept its base and root, unchanged its function during the historical period of development. Rast mugam based on this mode is called “mother of mugams”. Rast mode consists of 1+1+0.5 tone, which is created in three tetra-chords in the result of amalgamation of reach method of the first main tetra-chord. Literarily, Rast creates courage and cheerfulness at listener. Subgenres of Rast are: Bardasht (with Novruzu-Ravanda), Maye, Ushshag, Huseyni, Vilayati, Dilkesh, Kurdu, Shikasteyi-fars (Khojasta), Erag, Penjgah, Rak-Khorasani, Gerai, space for Rast. Other mugams relating to the Rast are: Mahur, Mahur-Hindi, Orta Mahur, Bayaty-Gajar, Gatar.
