= Hicaz pitch class set =

Set of scales named after the Hicaz makam

In Turkish music, the hicaz pitch class set is a set of scales that are named after the Hicaz Turkish makam. For Hicaz, there is the Hicaz tetrachord and Hicaz pentachord.

== Hicaz tetrachord and pentachord in 53-TET ==
The intervals of the Hicaz tetrachord and Rast pentachord within 53 Tone Equal Temperament are given in the table:

Hicaz pitch class set
| Pentachord | Tetrachord | Note order | Step to next note (Number of steps) | Note name starting from Dügâh |
|---|---|---|---|---|
| Hicaz pentachord | Hicaz tetrachord | 1 | S (5) | Dügâh |
| Hicaz pentachord | Hicaz tetrachord | 2 | A (12) | Dik Kürdî |
| Hicaz pentachord | Hicaz tetrachord | 3 | S (5) | Nim Hicâz |
| Hicaz pentachord | Hicaz tetrachord | 4 | T (9) (Only for pentachord) | Neva |
| Hicaz pentachord | - | 5 | - | Hüseynî |

== Makams that use the Hicaz pentachord or Hicaz tetrachord ==
| Name of Makam | Lower Çeşni | Higher Çeşni |
|---|---|---|
| Basit Suzinak | Rast pentachord | Hicaz tetrachord |
| Neveser | Nikriz pentachord | Hicaz tetrachord |

== Other intervals ==
According to the AEU System, Hicaz can be constructed not only through SA12S (5-12-5), but also BA13S, SA13B, and BA14B. But in practice, only SA12S is used.
