= Bayati (maqam) =

Music symbol

Characteristic tetrachord of maqam bayati

Bayati.

Bayātī (Arabic بياتي; Turkish Beyâtî), also known as Bayat and Uşşâk (Ushaq), is the name of a maqam (musical mode) in Arabic, Turkish, and related systems of music. Bayati is similar to a natural minor scale, with the primary exception of a half-flat second degree. The maqam is immensely popular in the Arab world, particularly in the Levant. In secular settings, it is favored for dabke folk dancing and pop music.

Bayati is also often used in religious liturgies of the Middle East. It is the favored maqam for the adhan in Medina, Saudi Arabia. Syrian Jews have used this maqam for their pizmonim singing and perform it at bar mitzvahs and Saturday night services. According to the Assyrian Church of the East, this mode is also called Qadmoyo (first).

Related maqamat are Husseini (essentially the Dorian mode, but the 2 and 6 are half-flat) and Bayati Shuri.

== Nucleus ==
The central tones of a maqam are created from two different intervals. The eleven central tones of the maqam used in the examplary sequence in this article may be reduced to three which make up the "nucleus" of the maqam:

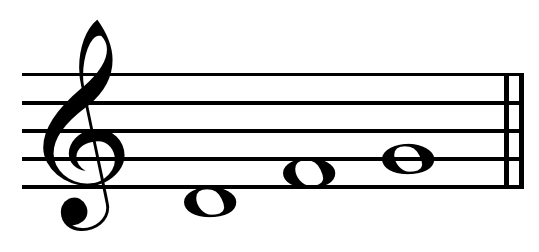

The tone rows of maqamat may be identical, such as maqam bayati and maqam 'ushshaq turki:

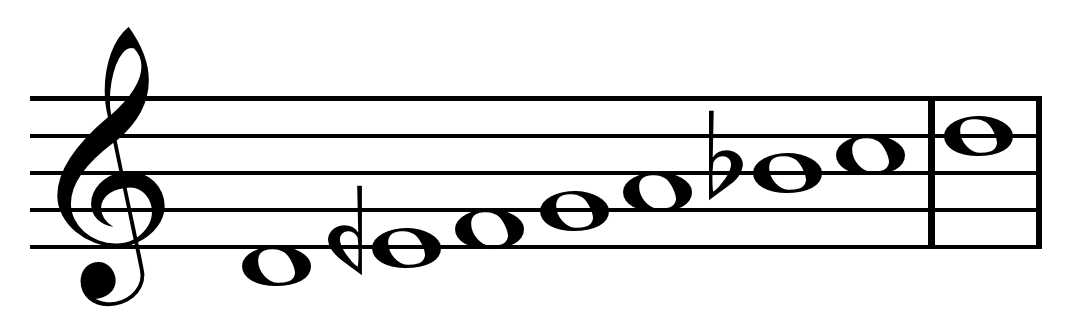

But be distinguished by different nuclei. Bayati is shown in the example above, while 'ushshaq turki is:

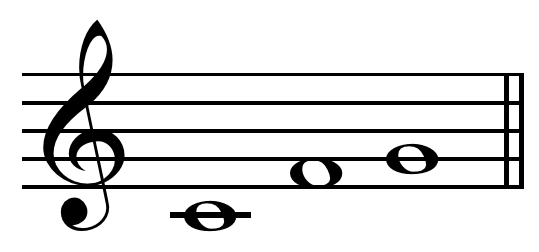

- Maqam Bayat on La: La / Si (Half-flat) / Do / Re / Mi / Fa / Sol / La.
- Maqam Bayat Si: Si / Do (Half-Sharp) / Re / Mi / Fa sharp / Sol / La / Si.
- Maqam Bayat Do: DO / Re (Half-flat) / Mi flat / Fa / Sol / La flat / Si flat / Do.
- Maqam Bayat Re: Re / Mi (Half-Flat) / fa / Sol / La / Si Flat / Do / Re.
- Maqam Bayat Mi: Mi / Fa (half-Sharp) / Sol / La / Si / Do / Re / Mi.
- Maqam Bayat Fa: Fa / Sol (half-flat) / La flat / Si flat / Do / Re flat / Mi flat / Fa.
- Maqam Bayat Sol: Sol / La (Half-flat) / Si Flat / Do / Re / Mi flat / Fa / Sol.
- Maqam Bayat Si Flat: Si Flat / Do (Half-Flat) / Re flat / Mi flat / Fa / / Fa Sharp / La flat / Si flat.
- Maqam Bayat Do Sharp: Do Sharp / Re (Half-Sharp) / Mi / Fa Sharp / La flat / La / Si / Do sharp.
- Maqam Bayat Mi Flat: Mi flat / Fa (Half-flat) / Fa Sharp / La flat / Si flat / Si / Do flat / Re flat.
- Maqam Bayat Fa Sharp: Fa Sharp / Sol (Half-Sharp) / La / Si / Do Sharp / Re / Mi / Fa Sharp.
- Maqam Bayat Sol Sharp: Sol Sharp / La (Half-Sharp) / Si / Do Sharp / Re Sharp / Mi / Fa Sharp / Sol Sharp.

(H-F) is Half-Flat – flat lowers the note a half step down, half flat means the note is lowered 1/4 step down. (H-S) is Half-Sharp – sharp raises the note a half step up, half sharp raises it 1/4 step up).

Quartertone intervals are not fixed. A general rule: they tend to be less flat while playing an ascending phrase and vice versa. Those intervals also differ from region to region. In Turkish Ottoman music, the Beyati quartertone is generally played slightly less flat than the 'darker' Ussak tone.

== Structure ==
It is often notated with a tonic on D, producing the scale D, E half-flat, F, G, A, B flat, C.

Maqam Bayati is formed with jins bayati on D (D, E half-flat, F, G) followed by either jins nahawand on G (G, A, B flat) or jins rast on G (G, A, B half-flat, C, D).
