= Buselik pitch class set (Turkish makam theory) =

Five notes defining the Buselik scale

In Turkish classical music, the Buselik pitch class set is a set of scales that are named after the Bûselik makam. For Buselik, there is the Buselik tetrachord and the Buselik pentachord.

== Buselik pentachord in 53-TET ==
The intervals of the Buselik pentachord and Buselik tetrachord within 53 Tone Equal Temperament are given in the table:

Buselik pitch class set
Pentachord	Tetrachord	Note order	Step to next note (Number of steps)	Note name starting from Buselik
Buselik pentachord	Buselik tetrachord (starting from Buselik)	1	T (9)	Buselik
Buselik pentachord	Buselik tetrachord (starting from Buselik)	2	B (4)	Hicaz
Buselik pentachord	Buselik tetrachord (starting from Buselik)	3	T (9)	Neva
Buselik pentachord	Buselik tetrachord (starting from Buselik)	4	T (9)	Hüseynî
Buselik pentachord	-	5	-	Mahur

== Makams that use the Buselik pentachord or Buselik tetrachord ==
Name of Makam	Lower Çeşni	Higher Çeşni		Notes
Buselik	Buselik pentachord	Hicaz pentachord	Kürdi tetrachord	
Nikriz	Nikriz pentachord	Rast tetrachord	Buselik tetrachord	
