= Trichord =

Contiguous three-note set from a musical scale

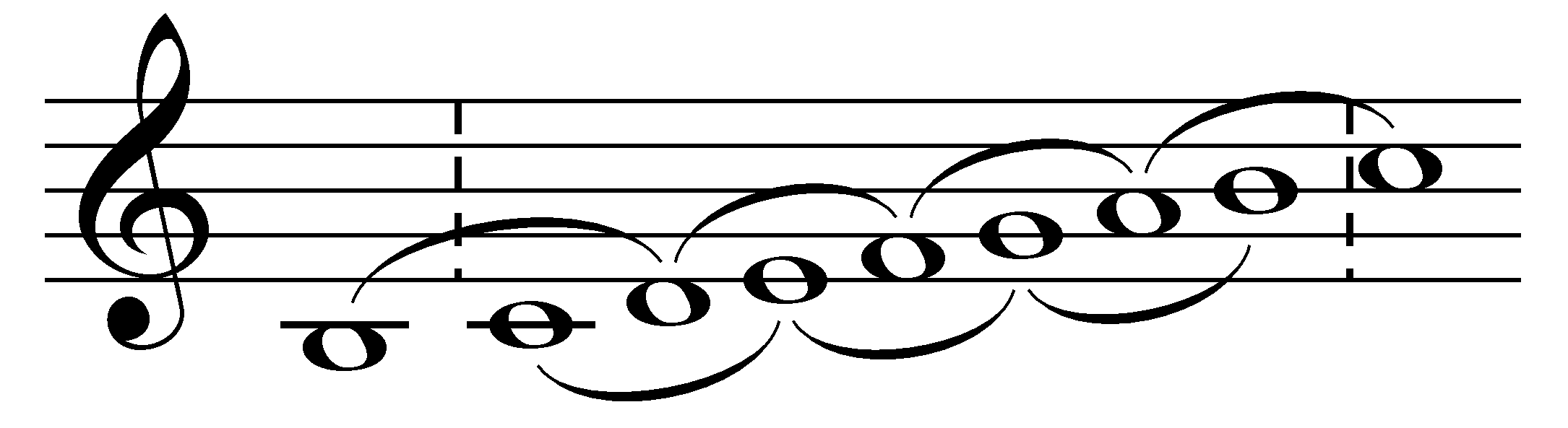
The seven contiguous trichords in C major. See also: Cardinality equals variety.

Webern's Concerto, Op. 24, tone row, composed of four trichords: P RI R I.

In music theory, a trichord (/traɪkɔːrd/) is a group of three different pitch classes found within a larger group. A trichord is a contiguous three-note set from a musical scale or a twelve-tone row.

In musical set theory there are twelve trichords given inversional equivalency, and, without inversional equivalency, nineteen trichords. These are numbered 1–12, with symmetrical trichords being unlettered and with uninverted and inverted nonsymmetrical trichords lettered A or B, respectively. They are often listed in prime form, but may exist in different voicings; different inversions at different transpositions. For example, the major chord, 3-11B (prime form: [0,4,7]), is an inversion of the minor chord, 3-11A (prime form: [0,3,7]). 3-5A and B are the Viennese trichord (prime forms: [0,1,6] and [0,5,6]).

== Historical Russian definition ==
In late-19th to early 20th-century Russian musicology, the term trichord (трихорд (/trixоrd/)) meant something more specific: a set of three pitches, each at least a tone apart but all within the range of a fourth or fifth. The possible trichords on C would then be:

Note			Number			Intervals
C	D	F	0	2	5	2, 3 (M2, m3)
C	D	G	0	2	7	2, 5 (M2, P4)
C	D♯/E♭	F	0	3	5	3, 2 (m3, M2)
C	E♭	G	0	3	7	3, 4 (m3, M3)
C	E	F♯/G♭	0	4	6	4, 2 (M3, M2)
C	E	G	0	4	7	4, 3 (M3, m3)
C	F	G	0	5	7	5, 2 (P4, M2)

Several of these pitch sets interlocking could form a larger set such as a pentatonic scale (such as C–D–F–G–B♭–C'). It was first coined by theorist Pyotr Sokalsky in his 1888 book Русская народная музыка ("Russian Folk Music") to explain the observed traits of the rural Russian folk music (especially from southern regions) that was just beginning to be recorded and published at this time. The term gained wide acceptance and usage, but as time went on it became less relevant to contemporary ethnomusicological findings; ethnomusicologist Kliment Kvitka opined in his 1928 article on Sokalsky's theories that it should also properly be used for pitch sets of three notes in the interval of a third, which had been found to be just as characteristic of Russian folk traditions (but which was unknown in Sokalsky's time). By mid-century, a group of Moscow-based ethnomusicologists (K. V. Kvitka, Ye. V. Gippius, A. V. Rudnyova, N. M. Bachinskaya, L. S. Mukharinskaya, among others) boycotted the use of the term altogether, yet it could still be seen in the mid-20th century due to its heavy use in the works of earlier theorists.

== Etymology ==
The term is derived by analogy from the 20th-century use of the word "tetrachord". Unlike the tetrachord and hexachord, there is no traditional standard scale arrangement of three notes, nor is the trichord necessarily thought of as a harmonic entity.

Milton Babbitt's serial theory of combinatoriality makes much of the properties of three-note, four-note, and six-note segments of a twelve-tone row, which he calls, respectively, trichords, tetrachords, and hexachords, extending the traditional sense of the terms and retaining their implication of contiguity. He usually reserves the term "source set" for their unordered counterparts (especially hexachords), but does occasionally employ terms such as "source tetrachords" and "combinatorial trichords, tetrachords, and hexachords" instead.

Allen Forte occasionally makes informal use of the term trichord to mean what he usually calls "sets of three elements", and other theorists (notably including Howard, and Carlton) mean by the term triad a three-note pitch collection which is not necessarily a contiguous segment of a scale or a tone row and not necessarily (in twentieth-century music) tertian or diatonic either.

== Number of unique trichords ==
Typically, there are 12 tones in the western scale. Computing the number of unique trichords is a mathematical problem. A computer program can quickly iterate all the triads and remove the ones that are merely transpositions of others, leaving (as noted above) nineteen or, to within inversional equivalence, twelve. As an example, the following list contains all trichords that can be made including the note C, but includes 36 that are merely transpositions or transposed inversions of others:

1. C D♭ D [0,1,2] – this combination has no name (half step cluster, with doubly diminished third and quintuply diminished fifth, spelled enharmonically)
2. C D♭ E♭ [0,1,3] – Phyrigian Trichord
3. C D♭ E [0,1,4] – Eaug with sus6
4. C D♭ F [0,1,5] – D♭maj seventh (omit 5th)
5. C D♭ G♭ [0,1,6] – D♭sus/maj7, Rite chord.2, Tritone-fourth.1
6. C D♭ G [0,5,6] (= inv. of [0,1,6])
7. C D♭ A♭ [0,4,5] (= inv. of [0,1,5])
8. C D♭ A [0,3,4] (= inv. of [0,1,4]) – D♭aug with sus7
9. C D♭ B♭ [0,2,3] (= inv. of [0,1,3])
10. C D♭ B [0,1,2] – this combination has no name (half step cluster, with doubly diminished third and quintuply diminished fifth, spelled enharmonically)
11. C D E♭ [0,2,3] (= inv. of [0.1.3]) – this combination has no name
12. C D E [0,2,4] – Eaug with sus#6
13. C D F [0,2,5] – Fsus6
14. C D G♭ [0,2,6] – Ddom seventh (enharmonic spelling, omit 5th)
15. C D G [0,2,7] – Csus2
16. C D A♭ [0,4,6] (= inv. of [0,2,6]) – Ddim sus7
17. C D A [0,3,5] (= inv. of [0,2,5]) – Dsus7
18. C D B♭ [0,2,4] – Daug with sus#6
19. C D B [0,1,3]
20. C E♭ E [0,3,4] (= inv. of [0,1,4]) – Eaug with sus7
21. C E♭ F [0,3,5] (= inv. of [0,2,5]) – Fsus#6
22. C E♭ G♭ [0,3,6] – Cdim
23. C E♭ G [0,3,7] – Cminor
24. C E♭ A♭ [0,4,7] (= inv. of [0,3,7]) – A♭major
25. C E♭ A [0,3,6] – A♭dim
26. C E♭ B♭ [0,2,5]
27. C E♭ B [0,1,4]
28. C E F [0,4,5] (= inv. of [0,1,5]) – Fsus7
29. C E G♭ [0,4,6] (= inv. of [0,2,6]) – Eaug with sus2
30. C E G [0,4,7] (= inv. of 0,3,7]) – Cmajor
31. C E A♭ [0,4,8] – C/E/A♭aug
32. C E A [0,3,7] – Aminor
33. C E B♭ [0,2,6] – Cdom seventh (omit 5th)
34. C E B [0,1,5] – Cmaj seventh (omit 5th)
35. C F G♭ [0,5,6] (= inv. of [0,1,6]) – Fsus#1
36. C F G [0,2,7]
37. C F A♭ [0,3,7] – Fminor
38. C F A [0,4,7] – Fmajor
39. C F B♭ [0,2,7]
40. C F B [0,1,6]
41. C G♭ G [0,1,6]
42. C G♭ A♭ [0,2,6] – A♭dom seventh (omit 5th)
43. C G♭ A [0,3,6] – F♯ dim
44. C G♭ B♭ [0,4,6] (= inv. of [0,2,6])
45. C G♭ B [0,5,6] (= inv. of [0,1,6])
46. C G A♭ [0,1,5] – A♭maj seventh (omit 5th)
47. C G A [0,2,5]
48. C G B♭ [0,3,5]
49. C G B [0,4,5] (= inv. of [0,1,5])
50. C A♭ A [0,1,4]
51. C A♭ B♭ [0,2,4] – Caug with sus#6
52. C A♭ B [0,1,4]
53. C A B♭ [0,1,2]
54. C A B [0,2,3] – this combination has no name
55. C B♭ B [0,1,2] – this combination has no name (half step cluster, with doubly diminished third and quintuply diminished fifth, spelled enharmonically)

While some of these chords are recognizable and ubiquitous, many others are unusual or rarely used. Although this list enumerates only trichords containing the note C, the number of all possible trichords inside a single octave is 220 (the binomial coefficient of picking three keys out of twelve).

== See also ==
- Triad
- All-trichord hexachord
