= Çeşni =

One of the elements that form a makam in music

Çeşni, in Turkish makam theory, is a set of scales usually seen in tetrachord or pentachord form that make up and give the name for a certain makam. A makam is composed of at least two Çeşnis, the lower (alt çeşni) and the upper (üst çeşni).

== See also ==
- Geçki
