= Yeden =

One of the elements that form a makam in music

Yeden, in Turkish makam theory, is the note preceding the tonic note (Durak) as the leading tone within a makam.

== History ==
The term Yeden has been first introduced into Turkish makam theory by Rauf Yekta Bey, he considered the Yeden a complementary feature of a makam.

== Melodic function ==
The Yeden, as with the leading tone in Western classical music, leads to the resolution of a makam. While the Yeden note is generally octave equivalent with the 7th tone within the scale, sometimes it may be a different note. When it is a different note, sometimes its octave equivalent counterpart can be used in the scale, even if it is normally not in the scale.

There are three different intervals that a Yeden can have in the 53 Tone Equal Temperament in Turkish makam theory, developed by and named after the Arel-Ezgi-Uzdilek notation.

=== 1. Bakiye ===
The Bakiye is equivalent to 4 Holdrian Commas (90.57 cents), which as a leading tone is slightly sharper than the 100 cent Western leading note.

A scale that uses this Yeden is Mahur.

=== 2. Küçük Mücennep ===
The Küçük Mücennep is equivalent to 5 Holdrian Commas (113.21 cents), which as a leading tone is slightly flatter than the 100 cent Western leading note.

A scale that uses this Yeden is Rast.

=== 3. Tanini ===
The Tanini is equivalent to 9 Holdrian Commas (203.77 cents), which is very slightly flatter than the 200 cent Western subtonic.

The Yeden being either Bakiye or Küçük Mücennep away from the tonic provide for a stronger resolution. If the Yeden is a Tanini away from the tonic, it's a weaker resolution.

A scale that uses this Yeden is Uşşak.

== See also ==
- Durak
- Seyir
