= Durak (Turkish makam theory) =

One of the elements that form a makam in music

Durak (also known as Karar), in Turkish makam theory, is the initial note of the first tetrachord or pentachord in the diatonic scale, and the tonic note which always concludes a composition within a makam.

== See also ==
- Final (music)
- Tiz Durak
- Güçlü
- Yeden
- Donanım
- Seyir
- Şifre
