= Turkish makam =

System of melodic modes used in traditional Turkic music

The Turkish makam (Turkish: makam pl. makamlar; from the Arabic word maqām مقام) is a system of melody types used in Turkish classical music and Turkish folk music. It provides a complex set of rules for composing and performance. Each makam specifies a unique intervalic structure (cinsler meaning genera) and melodic development (seyir). Whether a fixed composition (beste, şarkı, peşrev, âyin, etc.) or a spontaneous composition (gazel, taksim, recitation of Kuran-ı Kerim, Mevlid, etc.), all attempt to follow the melody type. The rhythmic counterpart of makam in Turkish music is usul.

== Geographic and cultural relations ==
The Turkish makam system has some corresponding relationships to maqams in Arabic music and echos in Byzantine music. Some theories suggest the origin of the makam to be the city of Mosul in Iraq. "Mula Othman Al-Musili," in reference to his city of origin, is said to have served in the Ottoman Palace in Istanbul and influenced Turkish Ottoman music. More distant modal relatives include those of Central Asian Turkic musics such as Uyghur “muqam” and Uzbek shashmakom. North and South Indian classical raga-based music employs similar modal principles. Some scholars find echoes of Turkish makam in former Ottoman provinces of the Balkans. All of these concepts roughly correspond to mode in Western classical music, although their compositional rules vary.

== Makam building blocks ==
=== Commas and accidentals ===
The accidentals (sharps and flats) used by the Arel-Ezgi-Uzdilek notation (a 53TET-based notation), as they are illustrated on a major tone ("Do"–"Re" in the solfege system) which is represented by 9 Holdrian commas.

In Turkish music theory, the octave is divided into 53 equal intervals known as commas (koma), specifically the Holdrian comma. Each whole tone is an interval equivalent to nine commas. In practice, only 24 of the 53 commas are used, as highlighted in the figure and table below. The following figure gives the comma values of Turkish accidentals. In the context of the Arab maqam, this system is not of equal temperament. In fact, in the Western system of temperament, C♯ and D♭—which are functionally the same tone—are equivalent to 4.5 commas in the Turkish system; thus, they fall directly in the center of the line depicted above.

=== Accidentals ===
Arel-Ezgi-Uzdilek notation adds 6 accidentals in addition to Western music theory's 4 accidentals. Note that the commonly used quarter-tone symbols and are used in this system to indicate a tone's adjusting with a koma, not a quarter-tone, like in Arabic maqam and Helmholtz-Ellis notation. Makam Rast is therefore notated in the "same" in Arabic and Turkish music, but Turkish Rast's third is a just major third, not a neutral third.

Accidental						
Function		1 koma sharp	4 komas sharp	5 komas sharp	8 komas sharp	9 komas= whole tone sharp
Accidental						
Function	9 komas= whole tone flat	8 komas flat	5 komas flat	4 komas flat	1 koma flat	

=== Notes ===
Unlike in Western music, where the note C, for example, is called 'C' regardless of what octave it might be in, in the Turkish system the notes are – for the most part – individually named (although many are variations on a basic name); this can be seen in the following table, which covers the notes from middle C ("Kaba Çârgâh", C_{4}) to the same note two octaves above ("Tîz Çârgâh", C_{6}):

The following table gives the tones over two octaves (ordered from highest to lowest), the pitch in commas and cents relative to the lowest note (equivalent to Western middle C), along with the nearest equivalent equal-temperament tone. The tones of the Çârgâh scale are shown in bold.

Tone name	Commas above middle C	Cents above middle C	Arel-Ezgi-Uzdilek notation of 53-ΤΕΤ tone	Nearest equivalent 12-ΤΕΤ tone
**Tîz Çârgâh**	106	2400	C_{6}	C_{6}
Tîz Dik Bûselik	105	2377	C_{6}	C_{6}
**Tîz Bûselik**	102	2309	B_{5}	B_{5}
Tîz Segâh	101	2287	A_{5} / B_{5}	B_{5}
Dik Sünbüle	98	2219	A_{5} / B_{5}	A^{♯}_{5} / B^{♭}_{5}
Sünbüle	97	2196	A^{♯}_{5} / B^{♭}_{5}	A^{♯}_{5} / B^{♭}_{5}
**Muhayyer**	93	2106	A_{5}	A_{5}
Dik Şehnâz	92	2083	G_{5} / A_{5}	A_{5}
Şehnâz	89	2015	G_{5} / A_{5}	G^{♯}_{5} / A^{♭}_{5}
Nim Şehnâz	88	1992	G^{♯}_{5} / A^{♭}_{5}	G^{♯}_{5} / A^{♭}_{5}
**Gerdâniye**	84	1902	G_{5}	G_{5}
Dik Mâhûr	83	1879	F_{5} / G_{5}	G_{5}
Mâhûr	80	1811	F_{5} / G_{5}	F^{♯}_{5} / G^{♭}_{5}
Eviç	79	1789	F^{♯}_{5} / G^{♭}_{5}	F^{♯}_{5} / G^{♭}_{5}
Dik Acem	76	1721	F_{5} / G_{5}	F_{5}
**Acem**	75	1698	F_{5}	F_{5}
**Hüseynî**	71	1608	E_{5}	E_{5}
Dik Hisâr	70	1585	D_{5} / E_{5}	E_{5}
Hisâr	67	1517	D_{5} / E_{5}	D^{♯}_{5} / E^{♭}_{5}
Nim Hisâr	66	1494	D^{♯}_{5} / E^{♭}_{5}	D^{♯}_{5} / E^{♭}_{5}
**Nevâ**	62	1404	D_{5}	D_{5}
Dik Hicâz	61	1381	C_{5} / D_{5}	D_{5}
Hicâz	58	1313	C_{5} / D_{5}	C^{♯}_{5} / D^{♭}_{5}
Nim Hicâz	57	1291	C^{♯}_{5} / D^{♭}_{5}	C^{♯}_{5} / D^{♭}_{5}
**Çârgâh**	53	1200	C_{5}	C_{5}
Dik Bûselik	52	1177	C_{5}	C_{5}
**Bûselik**	49	1109	B_{4}	B_{4}
Segâh	48	1087	A_{4} / B_{4}	B_{4}
Dik Kürdi	45	1019	A_{4} / B_{4}	A^{♯}_{4} / B^{♭}_{4}
Kürdi	44	996	A^{♯}_{4} / B^{♭}_{4}	A^{♯}_{4} / B^{♭}_{4}
**Dügâh**	40	906	A _{4}	A_{4}
Dik Zirgüle	39	883	G_{4} / A_{4}	A_{4}
Zirgüle	36	815	G_{4} / A_{4}	G^{♯}_{4} / A^{♭}_{4}
Nim Zirgüle	35	792	G^{♯}_{4} / A^{♭}_{4}	G^{♯}_{4} / A^{♭}_{4}
**Rast**	31	702	G_{4}	G_{4}
Dik Gevest	30	679	F_{4} / G_{4}	G_{4}
Gevest	27	611	F_{4} / G_{4}	F^{♯}_{4} / G^{♭}_{4}
Irak	26	589	F^{♯}_{4} / G^{♭}_{4}	F^{♯}_{4} / G^{♭}_{4}
Dik Acem Aşîrân	23	521	F_{4} / G_{4}	F_{4}
**Acem Aşîrân**	22	498	F_{4}	F_{4}
**Hüseynî Aşîrân**	18	408	E_{4}	E_{4}
Kaba Dik Hisâr	17	385	D_{4} / E_{4}	E_{4}
Kaba Hisâr	14	317	D_{4} / E_{4}	D^{♯}_{4} / E^{♭}_{4}
Kaba Nim Hisâr	13	294	D^{♯}_{4} / E^{♭}_{4}	D^{♯}_{4} / E^{♭}_{4}
**Yegâh**	9	204	D_{4}	D_{4}
Kaba Dik Hicâz	8	181	C_{4} / D_{4}	D_{4}
Kaba Hicâz	5	113	C_{4} / D_{4}	C^{♯}_{4} / D^{♭}_{4}
Kaba Nim Hicâz	4	91	C^{♯}_{4} / D^{♭}_{4}	C^{♯}_{4} / D^{♭}_{4}
**Kaba Çârgâh**	0	0	C_{4}	C_{4}

=== Intervals ===
The names and symbols of the different intervals (şifre) are shown in the following table:

Interval name (Aralığın adı)	Value in terms of commas (Koma olarak değeri)	Symbol (Simge)
koma or fazla	1	F
eksik bakiye	3	E
bakiye	4	B
küçük (sağir) mücenneb	5	S
büyük (kebir) mücenneb	8	K
tanîni	9	T
artık ikili	12 - 13	A

=== Tetrachords (dörtlüler) and pentachords (beşliler) ===
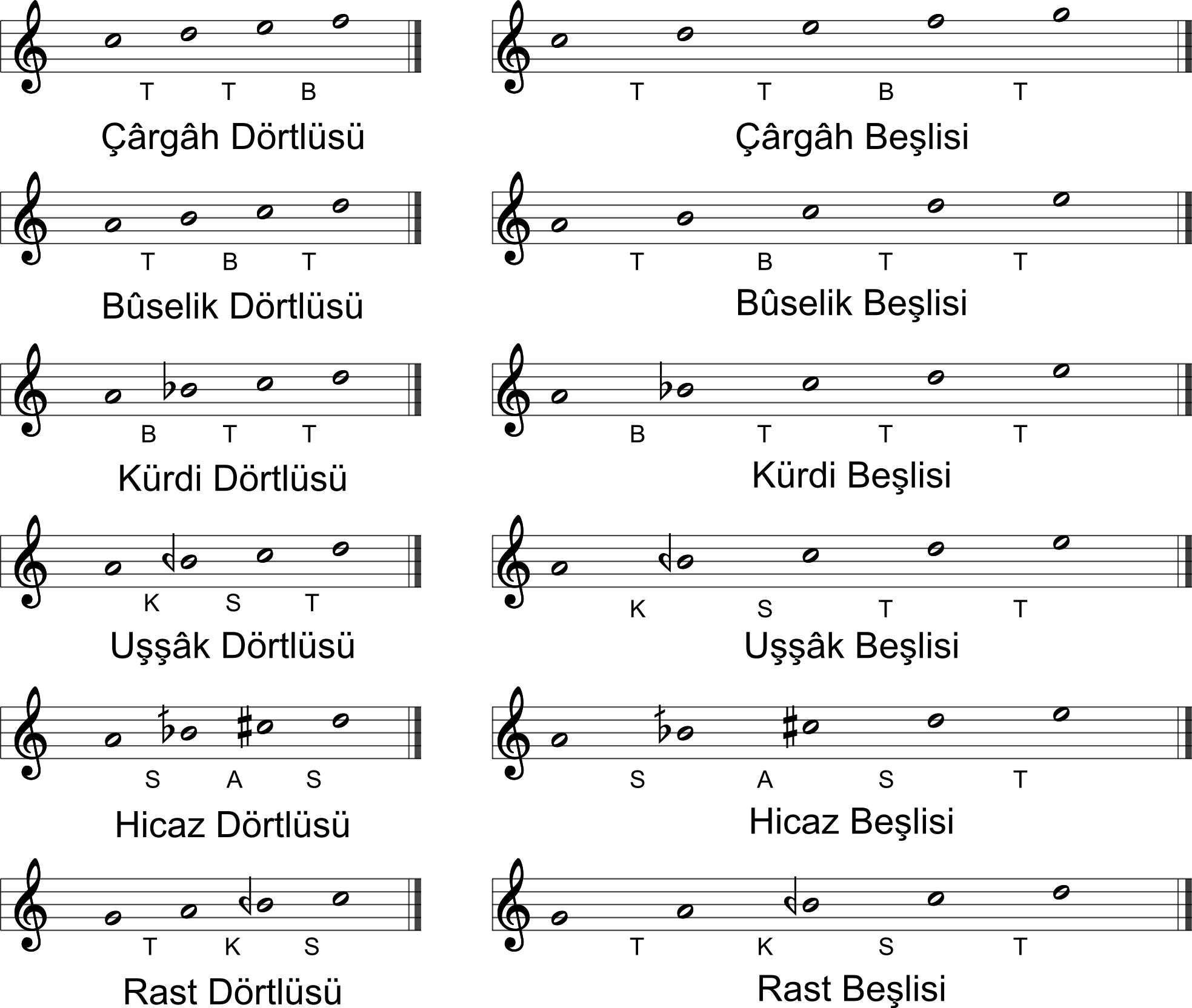
Tetrachords (dörtlü) are on the left, pentachords (beşli) on the right. The symbols (simge) from the table above are here used to signal the intervals used in these patterns

Similar to the construction of maqamat noted above, a makam in Turkish music is built of a tetrachord built atop a pentachord, or vice versa. Trichords exist, e.g. Saba, but are rarely used. Additionally, most makams have what is known as a "development" (genişleme in Turkish), which can occur either above or below (or both) the tonic and/or the highest note.

There are six basic tetrachords, named sometimes according to their tonic note and sometimes according to the tetrachord's most distinctive note:

- Çârgâh
- Bûselik
- Kürdî
- Uşşâk
- Hicaz
- Rast

There are also six basic pentachords with the same names with a tone (T) appended.

It is worth keeping in mind that these patterns can be transposed to any note in the scale, so that the tonic A (Dügâh) of the Hicaz tetrachord, for example, can be moved up a major second (9 commas) to B (Bûselik), or in fact to any other note. The other notes of the tetrachord, of course, are also transposed along with the tonic, allowing the pattern to preserve its character.

== Basic makam theory ==
A makam, more than simply a selection of notes and intervals, is essentially a guide to compositional structure: any composition in a given makam will move through the notes of that makam in a more or less ordered way. This pattern is known in Turkish as seyir (meaning, "route"), and there are three types of seyir:

- Ascending (çıkıcı);
- Descending (inici);
- Descending-ascending (inici-çıkıcı)

Makams are built of a tetrachord plus a pentachord (or vice versa), and in terms of this construction, there are three important notes in the makam:

- The Durak ("tonic"), which is the initial note of the first tetrachord or pentachord and which always concludes any piece written in the makam.
- The Güçlü ("dominant"), which is the first note of the second tetrachord or pentachord, and which is used as a temporary tonic in the middle of a piece (in this sense, it is somewhat similar to the axial pitches mentioned above in the context of Arab music). This use of the term "dominant" is not to be confused with the Western dominant; while the güçlü is often the fifth scale degree, it can just as often be the fourth, and occasionally the third.
- The Yeden ("leading tone"), which is most often the penultimate note of any piece and which resolves into the tonic; this is sometimes close to an actual Western leading tone (either slightly sharper or slightly flatter) and sometimes close to a Western subtonic.

Additionally, there are three types of makam as a whole:

- Simple makams (Basit makamlar), almost all of which have a rising seyir,
- Transposed makams (Göçürülmüş/Şed makamlar), which as the name implies are the simple makams transposed to a different tonic,
- Compound makams (Bileşik/Mürekkeb makamlar), which are a joining of differing makams and number in the hundreds.

== Some simple makams ==
=== Bûselik makam ===
This makam has two basic forms: in the first basic form (1), it consists of a Bûselik pentachord plus a Kürdî tetrachord on the note Hüseynî (E) and is essentially the same as the Western A minor; in the second (2), it consists of a Bûselik pentachord plus a Hicaz tetrachord on Hüseynî (E) and is identical to A harmonic minor. The tonic is A (Dügâh), the dominant Hüseynî (E), and the leading tone G♯ (Nim Zirgüle). Additionally, when descending from the octave towards the tonic, the sixth (F, Acem) is sometimes sharpened to become F♯ (Dik Acem), and the dominant (E, Hüseynî) flattened four commas to the note Hisar (1A). All these alternatives are shown below:

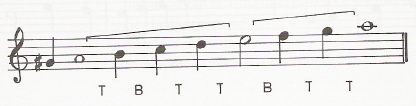
1)

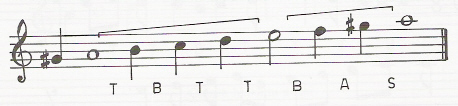
2)

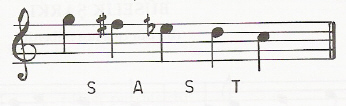
1A)

=== Çârgâh makam ===
This makam is thought to be identical to the Western C-major scale, but actually it is misleading to conceptualize a makam through Western music scales. Çârgâh makam consists of a Çârgâh pentachord and a Çârgâh tetrachord starting on the note Gerdâniye (G). Thus, the tonic is C (Çârgâh), the dominant is G (Gerdâniye), and the leading tone is B (Bûselik).

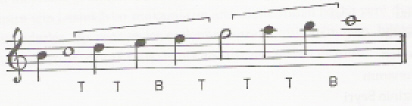

The çârgâh makam has at certain points in history been criticized for being a clumsy and unpleasant makam that can inspire those listening to it to engage in delinquency of various kinds.

=== Rast makam ===
This much-used makam - which is said to bring happiness and tranquility to the hearerer - consists of a Rast pentachord plus a Rast tetrachord on the note Neva (D); this is labeled (1) below. The tonic is G (Rast), the dominant D (Neva), and the leading tone F♯ (Irak). However, when descending from the octave towards the tonic, the leading tone is always flattened 4 commas to the note Acem (F), and thus a Bûselik tetrachord replaces the Rast tetrachord; this is labeled (2) below. Additionally, there is a development (genişleme) in the makam's lower register, below the tonic, which consists of a Rast tetrachord on the note D (Yegâh); this is labeled (1A) below.

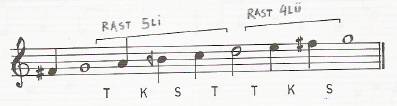
1)

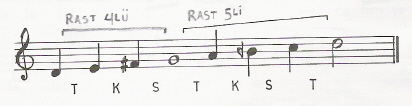
1A)

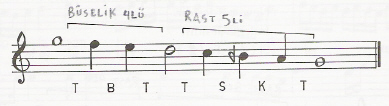
2)

In Turkey, the particular Muslim call to prayer (or ezan in Turkish) which occurs in the afternoon and is called Ikindi, as well as the day's final call to prayer called Yatsı, are often recited using the Rast makam.

=== Uşşâk makam ===
This makam consists of an Uşşâk tetrachord plus a Bûselik pentachord on the note Neva (D); this is labelled (1) below. The tonic is A (Dügâh), the dominant—here actually a subdominant—is D (Neva), and the leading tone—here actually a subtonic—is G (Rast). Additionally, there is a development in the makam's lower register, which consists of a Rast pentachord on the note D (Yegâh); this is labeled (1A) below.

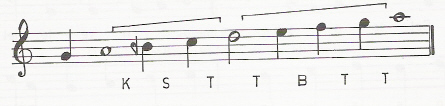
1)

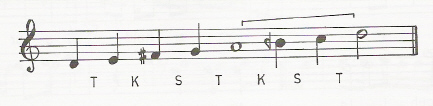
1A)

In Turkey, the particular call to prayer which occurs around noon and is called Öğle is most often recited using the Uşşak makam.

== See also ==
- List of Turkish makams
- List of notes in Turkish makam theory
- Rhythm in Turkish music
- Ottoman music
- Persian dastgah
- Arabic maqam
- Music of Turkey
- Turkish music (style)

== Notes ==
- Beken, Münir, and Karl Signell. "Confirming, delaying, and deceptive elements in Turkish improvisation," Maqām Traditions of Turkic Peoples: Proceedings of the Fourth Meeting of the ICTM Study Group 'maqām', Istanbul, 18–24 October 1998, edited by Jürgen Elsner and Gisa Jähnishen, in collaboration with Theodor Ogger and Ildar Kharissov,, Berlin: trafo verlag Dr. Wolfgang Weist, 2006. ISBN 3-89626-657-8
- "MAKAM". TDV İslâm Ansiklopedisi (in Turkish).
- "Türk Sanat Müziğinde Makam Olgusu | Prof. Dr. Hazım GÖKÇEN" (in Turkish).
- Kaçar, Dr. Gülçin Yahya (2008). "TÜRK MÛSİKÎSİNDE MAKAM". DergiPark (11): 153.
