= Chromaticism =

Compositional technique in music

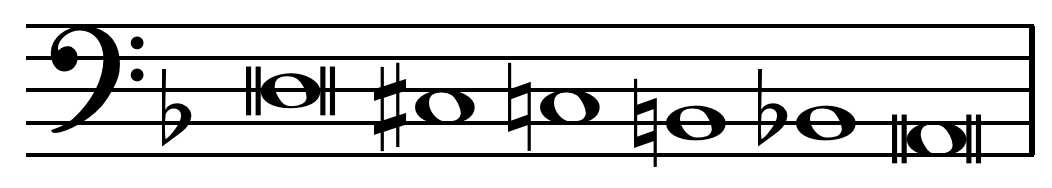
Chromatic fourth: lament bass bassline in Dm (D–C♯–C(♮)–B–B♭–A)

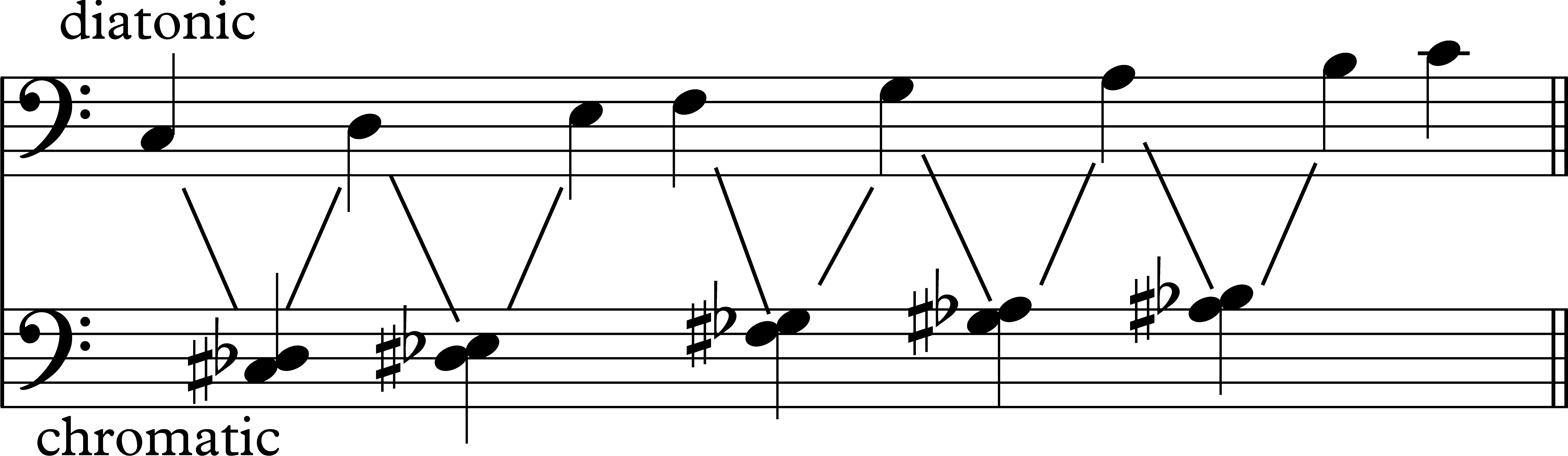
The diatonic scale notes (above) and the non-scale chromatic notes (below)

Chromaticism is a compositional technique interspersing the primary diatonic pitches and chords with other pitches of the chromatic scale. In simple terms, within each octave, diatonic music uses only seven different notes, rather than the twelve available on a standard piano keyboard. Music is chromatic when it uses more than just these seven notes.

Chromaticism is in contrast or addition to tonality or diatonicism and modality (the major and minor, or "white key", scales). Chromatic elements are considered, "elaborations of or substitutions for diatonic scale members".

== Development of chromaticism ==
Contemporary jazz and rock bass guitarist Joseph Patrick Moore demonstrating chromaticism (video)

Chromaticism began to develop in the late Renaissance period, notably in the 1550s, often as part of musica reservata, in the music of Cipriano de Rore, in Orlando Lasso's Prophetiae Sibyllarum, and in the theoretical work of Nicola Vicentino.

The following timeline is abbreviated from its presentation by Benward & Saker:

Baroque Period (1600—1750) "The system of major and minor scales developed during the early part of the baroque period. This coincided with the emergence of key consciousness in music."
Classical Period (1750—1825) "The major and minor keys were the basis of music in the classical period. Chromaticism was decorative for the most part and shifts from one key to another...were used to create formal divisions."
Romantic Period (1825—1900) "Chromaticism increased to the point that the major—minor key system began to be threatened. By the end of the period, keys often shifted so rapidly in the course of a composition that tonality itself began to break down."
Post-Romantic and Impressionistic Period (1875—1920) "With the breakdown of the major—minor key system, impressionist composers began to experiment with other scales....particularly...pentatonic, modal, and whole-tone scales."
Contemporary Period (1920—present) "The chromatic scale has predominated in much of the music of our period."
Jazz and Popular Music (1900—present) "Popular music has remained the last bastion of the major-minor key system... The blues scale ["a chromatic variant of the major scale"] is often found in jazz and popular music with blues influence."

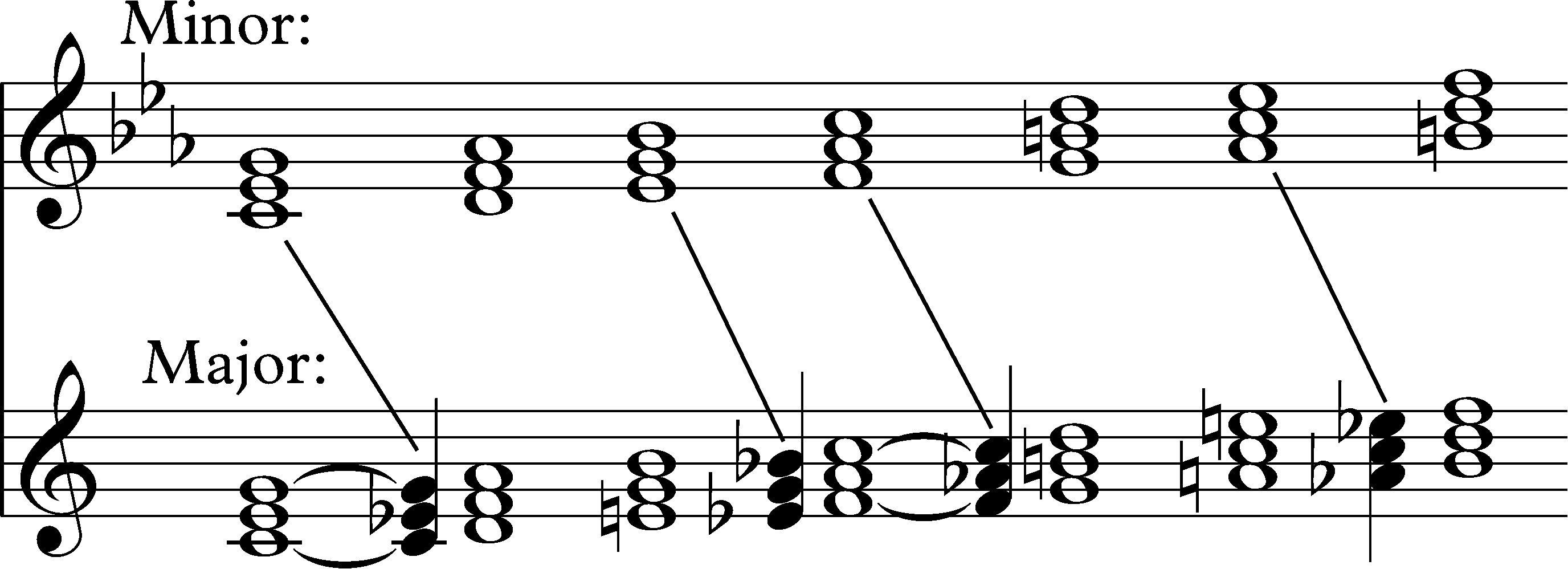
Mode mixture, using minor triads in the major key

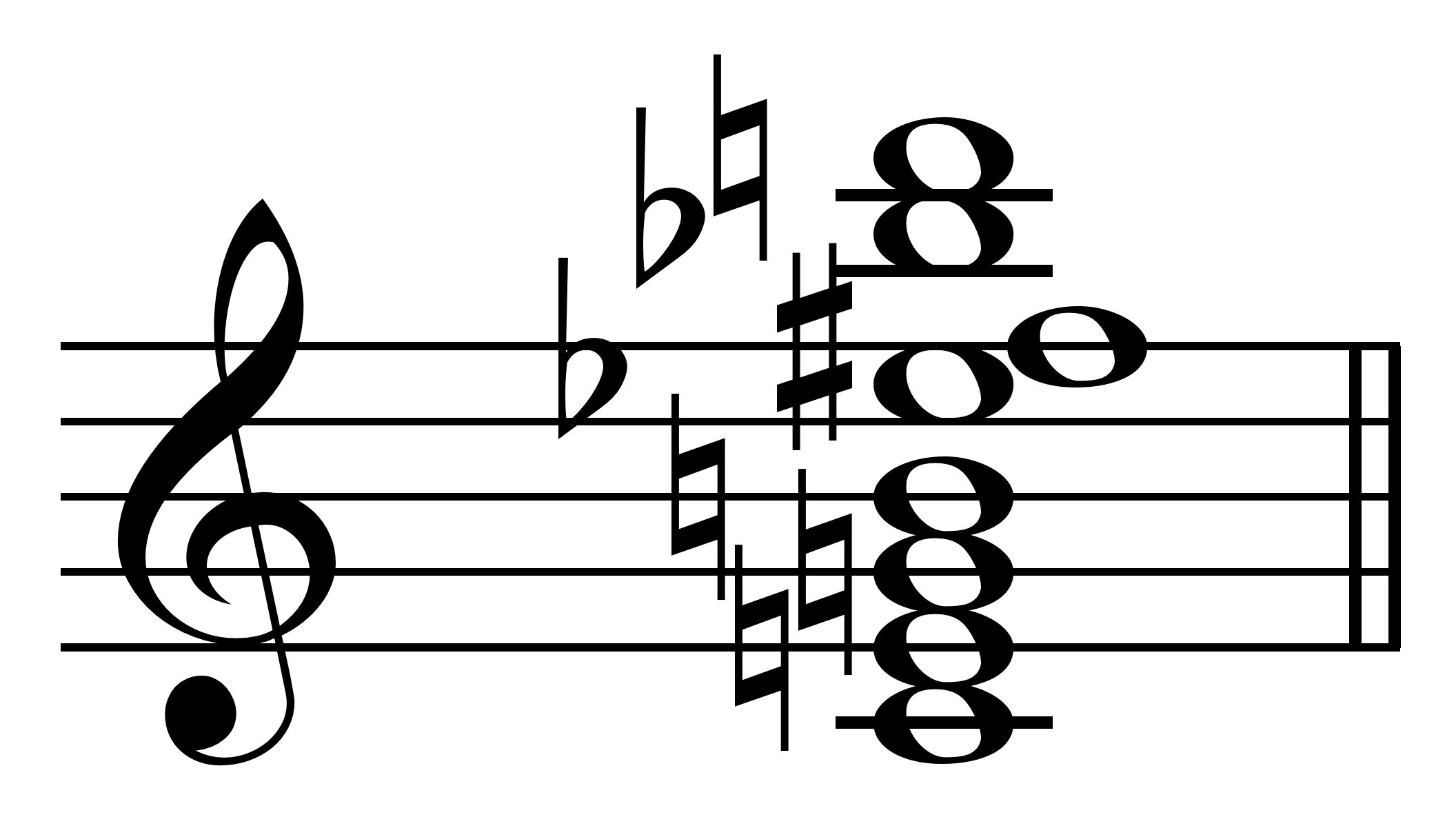
Final chord of Arnold Schoenberg's Sechs kleine Klavierstücke, 2nd movement, in thirds: C–E–G–B–D♯–F♯–A♯–C

As tonality began to expand during the last half of the nineteenth century, with new combinations of chords, keys and harmonies being tried, the chromatic scale and chromaticism became more widely used, especially in the works of Richard Wagner, such as the opera "Tristan und Isolde". Increased chromaticism is often cited as one of the main causes or signs of the "breakdown" of tonality, in the form of increased importance or use of:

- mode mixture
- leading tones
- tonicization of each chromatic step and other secondary key areas
- modulatory space
- hierarchical organizations of the chromatic set such as George Perle's
- the use of non-tonal chords as tonic "keys"/"scales"/"areas" such as the Tristan chord.

As tonal harmony continued to widen and even break down, the chromatic scale became the basis of modern music written using the twelve-tone technique, a tone row being a specific ordering or series of the chromatic scale, and later serialism. Though these styles/methods continue to (re)incorporate tonality or tonal elements, often the trends that led to these methods were abandoned, such as modulation.

=== Types of chromaticism ===
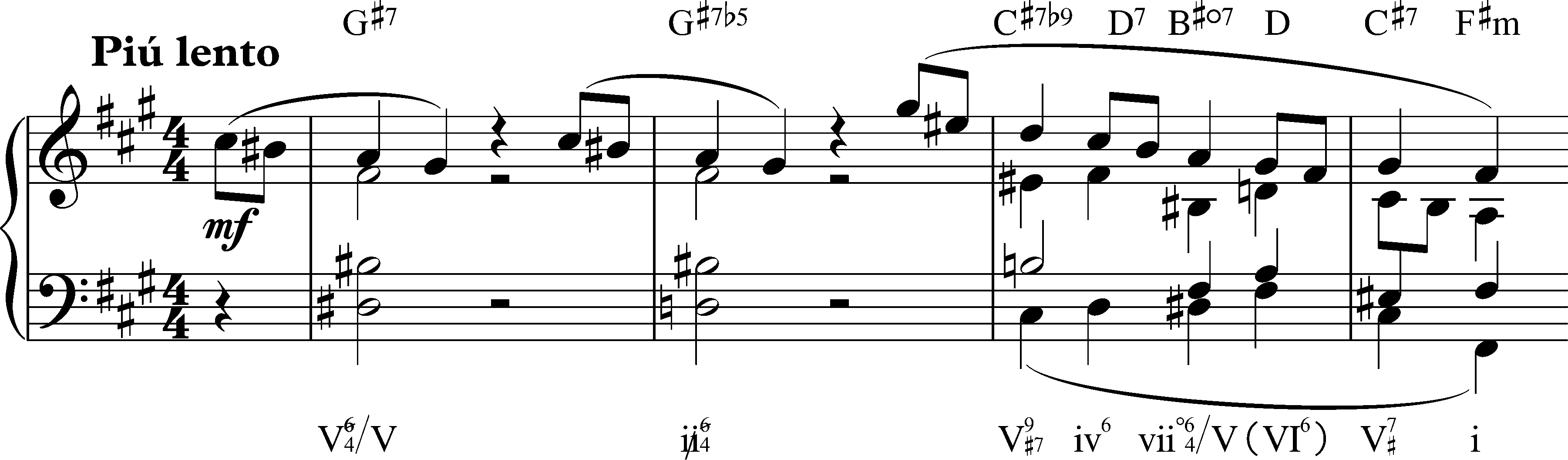
This phrase from Cesar Franck's Variations symphoniques (1885), mm. 5–9, demonstrates chromaticism from use of parallel keys (borrowed chords), that "chordal structures ... [may be] partially resultants of the descending bass lines" and that "chromatic evasiveness internally in the phrases [may be] countered by cadence strength and clarity", such as the "resolute movement from V of V to V to I".

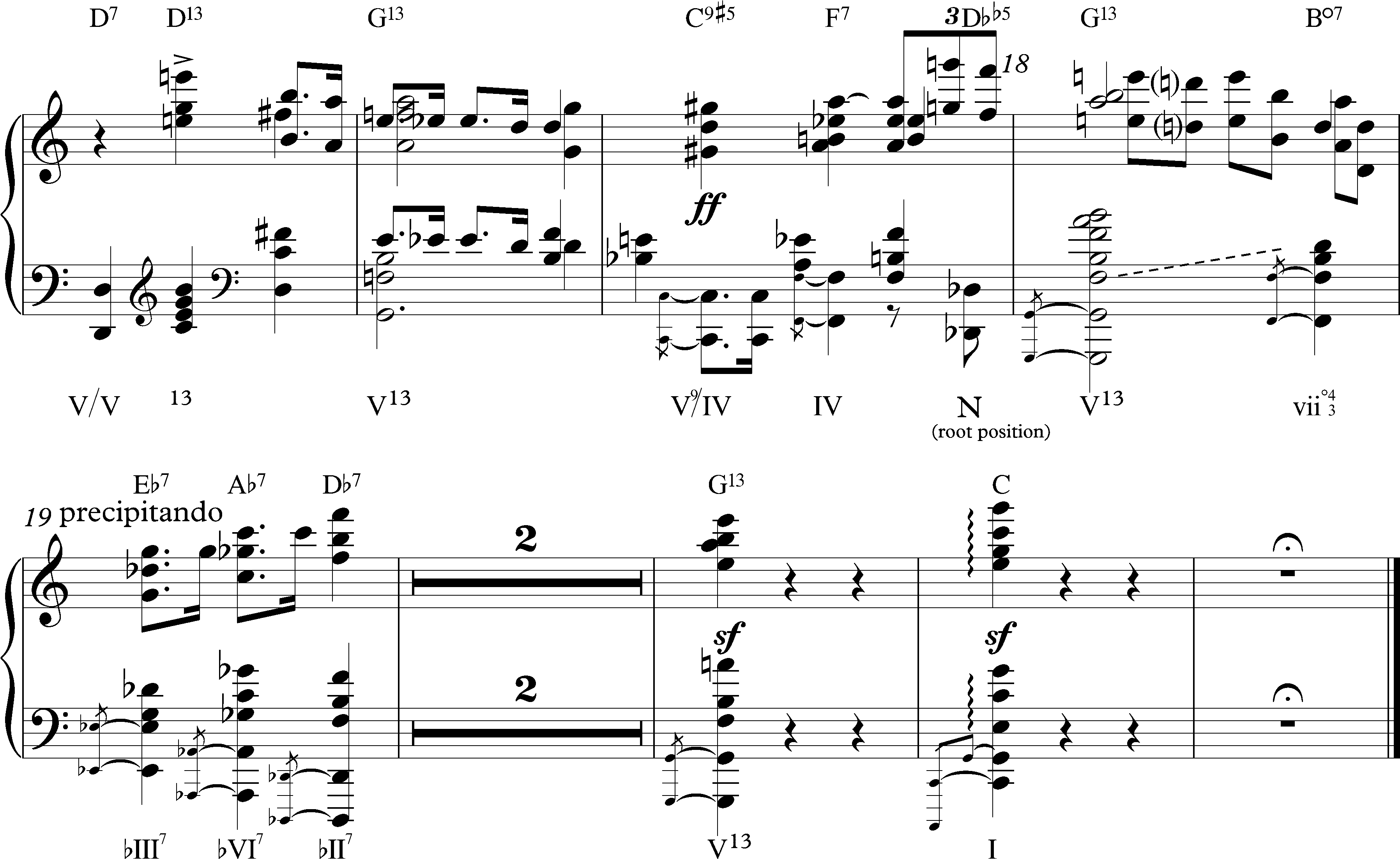
Chromaticism from "linear considerations" [voice leading], borrowed chords, and extended chords from the ending of Alexander Scriabin's Preludes, Op. 48, No. 4; "though most vertical sonorities include the seventh, ninth, eleventh, and thirteenth, the basic harmonic progressions are strongly anchored to the concept of root movement by fifths".

David Cope describes three forms of chromaticism: modulation, borrowed chords from secondary keys, and chromatic chords such as augmented sixth chords.

The chromatic expansion of tonality which characterizes much of nineteenth century music is illustrated in miniature by the substitution of a chromatic harmony for an expected diatonic harmony. This technique resembles the deceptive cadence, which involves the substitution of another diatonic chord for the expected diatonic goal harmony. ...

In the major mode a substitute chromatic consonance often proves to be a triad which has been taken from the parallel minor mode. This process ["assimilation"]...is called mixture of mode or simply mixture... Four consonant triads from the minor mode may replace their counterparts in the major mode. These we call chromatic triads by mixture.

— Allen Forte (1979)

The total chromatic is the collection of all twelve equally tempered pitch classes of the chromatic scale.

List of chromatic chords:

- Dominant seventh chords of subsidiary keys, used to create modulations to those keys (V^{7}–I cadences)
- Augmented sixth chords
- Neapolitan sixth chords as chromatic subdominants
- Diminished seventh chords as chromatic vii^{o}^{7}
- Altered chords
- Expanded chords
  - Shir-Cliff, Jay, and Rauscher (1965)

Other types of chromaticity:

- Pitch axis theory
- Parallel scales
- Nonchord tone
- The minor mode in major keys (mode mixture)
  - Shir-Cliff, Jay, and Rauscher (1965)

== Chromatic note ==
One of seven examples of linear chromaticism from Dizzy Gillespie's solo from "Hot House" or Listen on YouTube

Notes which do not belong to the key [those, "that lie within the major 2nds," of the diatonic scale] are called chromatic notes.

— Allen Forte (1979)

A chromatic note is one which does not belong to the scale of the key prevailing at the time. Similarly, a chromatic chord is one which includes one or more such notes. A chromatic and a diatonic note, or two chromatic notes, create chromatic intervals.

When one note of an interval is chromatic or when both notes are chromatic, the entire interval is called chromatic. Chromatic intervals arise by raising or lowering one or both notes of a diatonic interval, so that the interval is made larger or smaller by the interval of half step ["altered diatonic intervals"].

— Allen Forte (1979)

A chromatic scale is one which proceeds entirely by semitones, so dividing the octave into twelve equal steps of one semitone each.

Linear chromaticism is used in jazz: "All improvised lines ... will include non-harmonic, chromatic notes." Similar to in the bebop scale this may be the result of metric issues, or simply the desire to use a portion of the chromatic scale

== Chromatic chord ==
By chromatic linear chord is meant simply a chord entirely of linear origin which contains one or more chromatic notes. A great many of these chords are to be found in the literature.

— Allen Forte (1979)

[During the Romantic period] There was more prominent use of chromatic harmony, which employs chords containing tones not found in the prevailing major or minor scale. ... Chromatic chords add color and motion to romantic music. Dissonant, or unstable, chords were also more freely than during the classical era. By deliberately delaying the resolution of dissonance to a consonant, or stable, chord, romantic composers created feelings of yearning, tension, and mystery.

— Roger Kamien (1976)

♭II^{6}–V–I in C minor

A chromatic chord is a musical chord that includes at least one note not belonging in the diatonic scale associated with the prevailing key, the use of such chords is the use of chromatic harmony. In other words, at least one note of the chord is chromatically altered. Any chord that is not chromatic is a diatonic chord.

IV-♯iv^{o}7–V7–I

For example, in the key of C major, the following chords (all diatonic) are naturally built on each degree of the scale:

- I = C major triad [contains pitch classes C E G]
- ii = D minor triad [contains D F A]
- iii = E minor triad [contains E G B]
- IV = F major triad [contains F A C]
- V = G major triad [contains G B D]
- vi = A minor triad [contains A C E]
- vii^{o} = B diminished triad [contains B D F]
The interval of the augmented sixth normally resolves outwards by semitone to an octave.

However, a number of other chords may also be built on the degrees of the scale, and some of these are chromatic. Examples:

- ♭II in first inversion is called the Neapolitan sixth chord. For example, in C Major: F–A♭–D♭. The Neapolitan Sixth chord resolves to the V.
- The ♯iv diminished chord is the sharpened subdominant with diminished seventh chord. For example: F♯–A–C–E♭. The ♯IV diminished chord resolves to the V. The ♯IV can also be understood as the tonicization of V where it functions as vii^{o}7 of the V chord, written vii^{o}7/V.
- ♭VI: The augmented sixth chord, A♭–C(–C, D, or E♭)–F♯, resolves to the V.
- Consonant chromatic triads, modulation to these triads would be chromatic modulation:
  - ♭III, ♭VI, ♭II, ♯iv, vii, and ♭VII in major
  - ♮iii, ♮vi, ♭II, ♯iv, ii, and ♮vii in minor.

== Chromatic line ==
In music theory, passus duriusculus is a Latin term which refers to chromatic line, often a bassline, whether descending or ascending.

A line cliché is any chromatic line that moves against a stationary chord. There are many different types of line clichés—most often in the root, fifth or seventh—but there are two named line clichés. The major line cliché moves from the fifth of the chord to the sixth, then back to the fifth. Assuming the starting chord is the tonic, the simplest form of the major line cliché forms a I–I+–vi–I+ progression. The minor line cliché moves down from the root to the major seventh, to the minor seventh, and can continue until the fifth.

From the late 16th century onward, chromaticism has come to symbolize intense emotional expression in music. Pierre Boulez (1986, p. 254) speaks of a long established "dualism" in Western European harmonic language: "the diatonic on the one hand and the chromatic on the other as in the time of Monteverdi and Gesualdo whose madrigals provide many examples and employ virtually the same symbolism. The chromatic symbolizing darkness doubt and grief and the diatonic light, affirmation and joy—this imagery has hardly changed for three centuries." When an interviewer asked Igor Stravinsky (1959, p. 243) if he really believed in an innate connection between "pathos" and chromaticism, the composer replied: "Of course not; the association is entirely due to convention." Nevertheless, the convention is a powerful one and the emotional associations evoked by chromaticism have endured and indeed strengthened over the years. To quote Cooke (1959, p. 54) "Ever since about 1850—since doubts have been cast, in intellectual circles, on the possibility, or even the desirability, of basing one's life on the concept of personal happiness—chromaticism has brought more and more painful tensions into our art-music, and finally eroded the major system and with it the whole system of tonality."

Examples of descending chromatic melodic lines that would seem to convey highly charged feeling can be found in:

1. The death-wish of a spurned lover expressed in the madrigal "Moro lasso al mio duolo", by Carlo Gesualdo (1566–1613):
  Gesualdo moro lasso or Listen on YouTube
2. The ground bass that underpins Dido's grief-laden Lament from Purcell's opera Dido and Aeneas (1689):
  Dido's lament or Listen on YouTube
3. The lover’s frustration expressed in ‘Morgengruss’ from Schubert’s song cycle Die schöne Müllerin. The progression is similar to Gesualdo’s (above) with the bass line and voice moving in parallel thirds:
  Schubert Morgengruss
4. The seductive melody of the aria "L'amour est un oiseau rebelle" from Bizet's opera Carmen (1875):
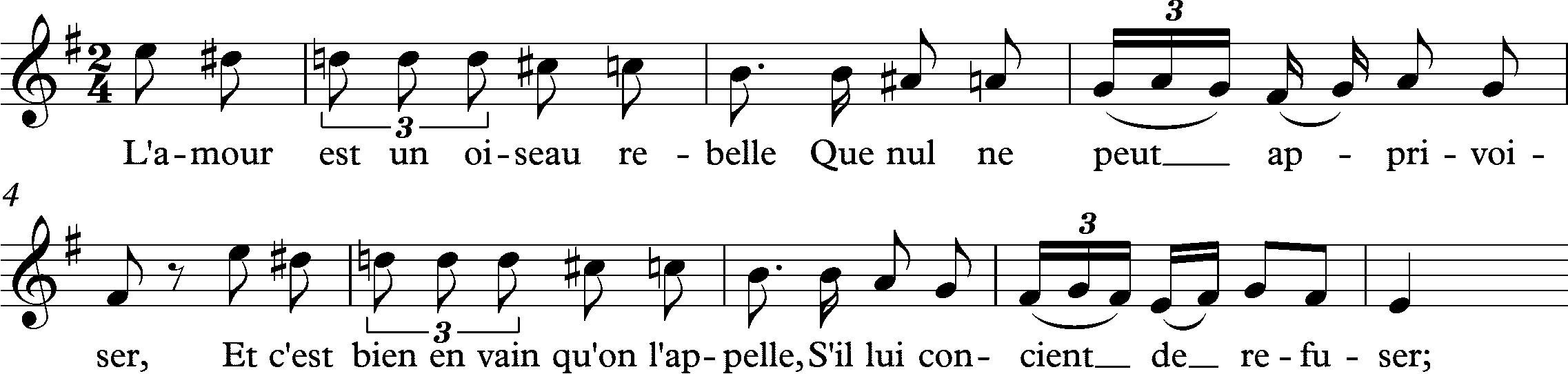
  Carmen aria "L'amour est un oiseau rebelle" or Listen on YouTube (This phrase is quoted by Dizzy Gillespie in the jazz example given above.)
5. The rich harmonization of a descending chromatic scale in the 'Sleep Motif' from Wagner's opera Die Walküre, act 3 (1870). Donington (1963), p. 172 speaks of this music's "slow chromatic drift and its modulations as elusive as the soft drift into sleep itself, when the sharp edges of consciousness begin to blur and fade".
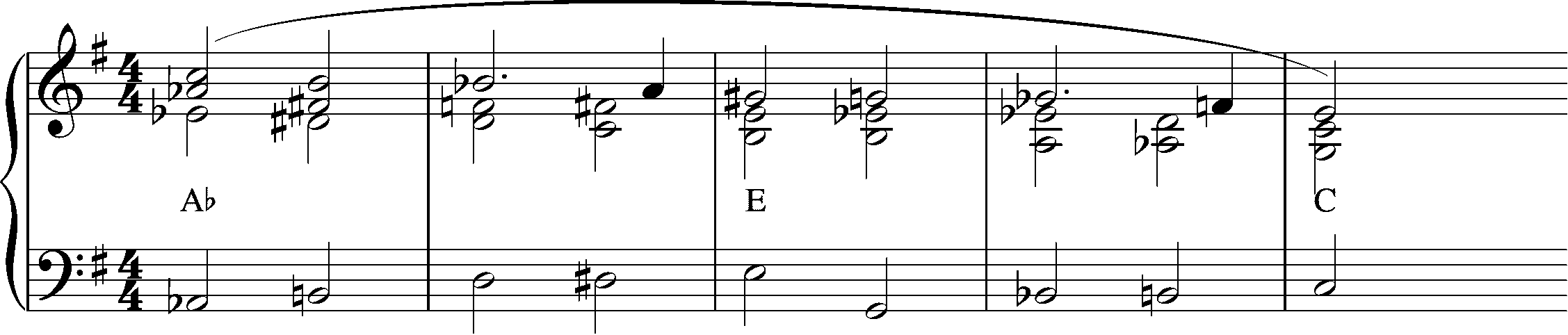
  Sleep music from act 3 of Wagner's opera Die Walküre or Listen on YouTube

== Quotes ==
Some individual views on chromaticism include:

Not only at the beginning of a composition but also in the midst of it, each scale-step [degree] manifests an irresistible urge to attain the value of the tonic for itself as that of the strongest scale-step. If the composer yields to this urge of the scale-step within the diatonic system of which this scale-step forms part, I call this process tonicalization and the phenomenon itself chromatic.

— Heinrich Schenker (1906)

Chromaticism is almost by definition an alteration of, an interpolation in or deviation from this basic diatonic organization.

— Leonard B. Meyer (1956)

Throughout the nineteenth century, composers felt free to alter any or all chord members of a given tertian structure [chord built from thirds] according to their compositional needs and dictates. Pronounced or continuous chordal alteration [and 'extension'] resulted in chromaticism. Chromaticism, together with frequent modulations and an abundance of non-harmonicism [non-chord tones], initially effected an expansion of the tertian system; the overuse of the procedures late in the century forewarned the decline and near collapse [atonality] of the system [tonality].

— Paul Cooper (1975)

Chromaticism is the name given to the use of tones outside the major or minor scales. Chromatic tones began to appear in music long before the common-practice period, and by the beginning of that period were an important part of its melodic and harmonic resources. Chromatic tones arise in music partly from inflection [alteration] of scale degrees in the major and minor modes, partly from secondary dominant harmony, from a special vocabulary of altered chords, and from certain nonharmonic tones... Notes outside the scale do not necessarily affect the tonality...tonality is established by the progression of roots and the tonal functions of the chords, even though the details of the music may contain all the tones of the chromatic scale.

— Walter Piston (1987)

Sometimes...a melody based on a regular diatonic scale (major or minor) is laced with many accidentals, and although all 12 tones of the chromatic scale may appear, the tonal characteristics of the diatonic scale are maintained. ... Chromaticism [is t]he introduction of some pitches of the chromatic scale into music that is basically diatonic in orientation, or music that is based on the chromatic scale instead of the diatonic scales.

— Benward & Saker (2003)

== Connotations ==
Chromaticism is often associated with dissonance.

In the 16th century the repeated melodic semitone became associated with weeping, see: passus duriusculus, lament bass, and pianto.

Susan McClary (1991) argues that chromaticism in operatic and sonata form narratives can be chosen to be understood through a Marxist narrative as the "Other", racial, sexual, class or otherwise, to diatonicism's "male" self, whether through modulation, as to the secondary key area, or other means. For instance, Catherine Clément calls the chromaticism in Wagner's Isolde "feminine stink". However, McClary also contradicts herself saying that the same techniques used in opera to represent madness in women were historically highly prized in avant-garde instrumental music, "In the nineteenth-century symphony, Salome's chromatic daring is what distinguishes truly serious composition of the vanguard from mere cliché-ridden hack work." (p. 101)

== See also ==
- 20th-century music – Classical
