= The Cat Came Back (1988 film) =

- Directed by: Cordell Barker
- Written by: Cordell Barker
- Based on: The Cat Came Back by Harry S. Miller
- Produced by: Richard Condie; Cordell Barker
- Starring: Richard Condie
- Distributed by: National Film Board of Canada; Buena Vista Pictures (theatrical)
- Release date: 22 June 1988; (with Who Framed Roger Rabbit)
- Running time: 8 minutes
- Country: Canada
- Language: English

The Cat Came Back is a 1988 Canadian short animated comedy film by Cordell Barker, produced by fellow award-winning animator Richard Condie in Winnipeg for the National Film Board of Canada. It is based on the children's song "The Cat Came Back" by Harry S. Miller. It was released in Canadian theaters with Who Framed Roger Rabbit.

The film was translated into French Canadian the year following its release.

In May 2017, the NFB and Canadian publisher Firefly Books adapted the film as a children's book.

== Plot ==
The film portrays the increasingly desperate efforts of the elderly Mr. Johnson to rid himself of a small yet extremely troublesome yellow cat that will not leave his home. He first tries to leave the cat in the woods only to get lost himself. An attempt to drown it at sea ends in him nearly drowning. He then tries to send the cat away in a hot air balloon, but winds up getting dragged into the sky himself when he cuts the balloon free. For his fourth attempt, Mr. Johnson tries to take it away on a pump trolley, running over many damsels in distress and even a cow tied to the train tracks until he hits a bug crossing the railroad track, causing the trolley to jump the rails and send him plummeting into an abandoned mine where he is attacked by rats, snakes and bats. Not only does the cat find its way back each time, but it becomes increasingly destructive after each attempt until Mr. Johnson finally has enough. He tries to blow up the cat with a large pile of dynamite, but accidentally lights his hair on fire instead and dies in the explosion. Thinking that he finally got rid of the cat, Mr. Johnson's spirit proceeds to tease his foe when his dead body lands on top of it, killing it and releasing all nine of its lives to bedevil Mr. Johnson for all eternity.

== Voice cast ==
- Richard Condie as Mr. Johnson

== Reception and legacy ==
The film received over 15 awards, including a Genie Award for Best Animated Short, as well as an Academy Award nomination, but lost to the Pixar CGI-animated short Tin Toy. It was also chosen for inclusion in animation historian Jerry Beck's 50 Greatest Cartoons, placing at #32 making it the youngest cartoon on the list. It was also included in the Animation Show of Shows.

Mr. Johnson and the cat were later used in two adverts for Hula Hoops, with one of the ads having surfaced on YouTube.
