= List of popular music songs featuring Andalusian cadences =

Following is a list of popular music songs which feature a chord progression commonly known as Andalusian cadences.

Items in the list are sorted alphabetically by the band or artist's name. Songs which are familiar to listeners through more than one version (by different artists) are mentioned by the earliest version known to contain Andalusian cadences (which is most frequently the original version). Songs whose composers are unknown are at the bottom of the list, sorted alphabetically in their turn by title.

== A ==
- "Amoeba" (1981) by Adolescents
- "One Chord Wonders" (1977) by The Adverts
- "Miami" (2005) by Against Me!
- "Against The Grain" (2008) by Akon
- "Genesis Ch. 1 V. 32" (1977) by The Alan Parsons Project
- "Big in Japan" (1984) by Alphaville
- "Mala Malita Mala" by Remedios Amaya
- "Cat's Eye" (1983) by Anri
- "Heat of the Night" (1997) by Aqua (band)
- "Knee Socks" (2013) by Arctic Monkeys
- "Torero" (1985) by Aria
- "Without You" (2000) by Aria
- "Hora" (1982) by Avi Toledano
- "Anthropology" (2012) by Awkward Marina

== B ==
- "Sanity" (1989) by Bad Religion
- "Cruel Summer" by Bananarama
- "Good Vibrations" (1966) by The Beach Boys
- "Lonely Sea" (1963) by The Beach Boys
- "I'll Be Back" (1964) by The Beatles
- "Mr. Pinstripe Suit" (1998) by Big Bad Voodoo Daddy
- "Oh Yeah" (2003) by Big Bad Voodoo Daddy
- "War Pigs" (1970) by Black Sabbath
- "Mordred's Song" (1995) by Blind Guardian
- "Then Came the Last Days of May" (1972) by Blue Öyster Cult
- "Unpaid Intern" (2021) by Bo Burnham
- "Freestyler" (2000) by Bomfunk MC's
- "China Girl" (1983) by David Bowie and Iggy Pop
- "Nadie Te Quiere Ya" (1968) by Los Brincos
- "El Cuarto de Tula" (1997) by Buena Vista Social Club
- "Sodade" (1974) by Bonga
- "Moonage Daydream" (1971) by David Bowie
- "Angelo" (1977) by Brotherhood of Man
- "People Get Up and Drive Your Funky Soul" (1973) by James Brown

== C ==
- "Word Up!" (1986) by Cameo
- "Supernature" (1977) by Cerrone
- "Hit the Road Jack" (1961) by Ray Charles
- "Basketball Jones" (1973) by Cheech & Chong
- "25 or 6 to 4" (1970) by Chicago
- "Breathe" (2007) by The Cinematic Orchestra
- "Just One Last Dance" (2004) by Sarah Connor & Marc Terenzi

== D ==
- "Shiny Object Syndrome" (2022) by Daniel Thrasher
- "Politicians In My Eyes" (1975) by Death
- "Hey Joe" (1968) by Deep Purple
- "April" (1969) by Deep Purple
- "Green Slime" (1968) by Richard Delvy
- "Nour El Ain" (1996) by Amr Diab
- "Sultans of Swing" (1978) by Dire Straits
- "You Think You're a Man" (1984) by Divine
- "One More Cup of Coffee" (1976) by Bob Dylan

== E ==
- “Ticket to the Moon” (1981) by Electric Light Orchestra
- "El Porompompero" by Manolo Escobar
- "Y VIVA ESPAÑA" by Manolo Escobar
- "Eu Navegarei" by Azmaveth Carneiro Silva

== F ==
- "I Disappear" (2004) by The Faint
- "Blue Morning, Blue Day" (1978) by Foreigner
- "Feels Like the First Time" (1977) by Foreigner
- "Eye of the Hurricane" (1971) by Fraction

== G ==
- “LION” (2019) by (G)I-dle
- "Jazz à gogo" (1964) by France Gall
- "Twilight Zone" (1982) by Golden Earring
- "El Mañana" (2006) by Gorillaz
- "Anji" (1961) by Davey Graham
- "Heartbreaker" (1969) by Grand Funk Railroad
- "Feeling Good" (1965) by Cy Grant
- "Wait a Million Years" (1969) by The Grass Roots
- "Dame Veneno" (1977) by Las Grecas
- "Brain Stew" (1996) and "Hitchin' a Ride" (1997) by Green Day
- "14 Years" (1991) by Guns N' Roses

== H ==
- "Maneater" (1982) by Hall & Oates
- "Appears" (1999) by Ayumi Hamasaki
- "A Louse is not a Home" (1974) by Peter Hammill
- "How Can We Hang On to a Dream?" (1966) by Tim Hardin
- "Wind of Change" (1974) by Hawkwind
- "Blank Generation" (1977) by Richard Hell & the Voidoids
- "A Tale That Wasn't Right" (1987) by Helloween
- "Mad About You" (2000) by Hooverphonic
- "Mad Pat" (1974) by Horslips

== I ==
- "Blue Spanish Sky" (1989) by Chris Isaak
- "Believer" (2017) by Imagine Dragons

== J ==
- "Smooth Criminal" (1987) by Michael Jackson
- "Who Is It" (1991) by Michael Jackson
- “Believe” (1995) by Elton John
- "Summer in the City" (1973) by Quincy Jones

== K ==
- "Epitaph" (1969) by King Crimson
- "Rosey Won't You Please Come Home" (1966) by The Kinks
- "This Time Tomorrow" (1970) by The Kinks
- ”Casey’s Last Ride” (1970) by Kris Kristofferson
- "Balalaika" (2006) by Kirari Tsukishima

== L ==
- "The Ketchup Song" a.k.a. "Aserejé" (2002) by Las Ketchup
- "Bad Habits" (2016) by The Last Shadow Puppets
- "Me Leva" (1994) by Latino
- "Não adianta chorar" (1994) by Latino
- "The World Is Stone" (1992) by Cyndi Lauper
- "Sleeping Beauty" (1978) by Lene Lovich
- "Les mots bleus" (1974) by Christophe

== M ==
- "Vapor Barato" (1971) by Jards Macalé
- "El Gringo" (2012) by Manowar
- "Grendel" by Marillion
- "Coffee Cold" (1966) by Galt MacDermot
- "Hijo de la Luna" (1986) by Mecano
- "Come to the Sabbath" (1984) by Mercyful Fate
- "The Four Horsemen" (1983) by Metallica
- "Valleri" (1968) by The Monkees
- "Nights in White Satin" (1967) by The Moody Blues
- "God Bless the Children of the Beast" (1983) by Mötley Crüe
- "Citizen Erased" (2001) by Muse
- "Resistance" (2009) by Muse
- "House of Wolves" (2006) by My Chemical Romance
- "Stolen Dance" (2012) by Milky Chance

== N ==
- "Purple Lips" (1981) by Nico

== O ==
- "Never Learn" (1966) by The Odds & Ends
- "California Demise" pt. 1 and 2 (1994) by The Olivia Tremor Control
- "Define a Transparent Dream" (1996) by The Olivia Tremor Control
- "A Sleepy Company" (1999) by The Olivia Tremor Control

== P ==
- "Last Resort" (2000) by Papa Roach
- "Balanţa inimii" (1979) by Margareta Pâslaru
- "Kissing You Goodbye" (2011) by The Pierces
- "Secret" (2007) by The Pierces
- "Echoes" (1971) by Pink Floyd
- "Matilda Mother" (1967) by Pink Floyd
- "Roads" (1997) by Portishead
- "Hasta Siempre" (1965) by Carlos Puebla
- "Hush Hush" (2009) by The Pussycat Dolls
- "Requiem for My Harlequin" (2022) by Poets of the Fall

== Q ==
- "Innuendo" (1991) by Queen

== R ==
- "Now I Wanna Sniff Some Glue" (1976) by Ramones
- "Subterranean Homesick Blues" (1989) by Red Hot Chili Peppers
- "Weight-Lifting Lulu" (1978) by The Residents
- "Groovin' Hard" (1970) by the Buddy Rich Big Band
- "Disturbia" (2008) by Rihanna
- "Nothing To Regret" (2018) by Robinson
- "If There Is Something" (1972) by Roxy Music
- "Both Ends Burning" (1975) by Roxy Music

== S ==
- "Drive Dead Slow" (1999) by Sahara Hotnights
- "Pale Movie" (1994) by Saint Etienne
- "Hell's Greatest Dad" (2024) by Sam Haft
- "Guitar Tango" (1962) by The Shadows
- "Objection (Tango)" (2001) by Shakira
- "Runaway" (1961) by Del Shannon
- "50 Ways to Leave Your Lover" (1976) by Paul Simon
- "Hazy Shade of Winter" (1966) by Simon & Garfunkel
- "Don't Let Me Be Misunderstood" (1964) by Nina Simone
- "Feeling Good" (1965) by Nina Simone
- "Pink Elephants On Parade" (1941) by the Sportsmen
- "Put A Lid On It" (1996) by Squirrel Nut Zippers
- "Stark Raving Love" (1981) by Jim Steinman
- "Wild World" (1970) by Cat Stevens
- "Made of Stone" (1989) by The Stone Roses
- "Nice 'n' Sleazy" (1978) by The Stranglers
- "Ice" (1979) by The Stranglers
- "Stray Cat Strut" (1981) by Stray Cats
- "Red Lights" (2021) by Stray Kids
- "Che" (1977) by Suicide
- "Love Child" (1968) by The Supremes
- ”Look What You Made Me Do” (2017) by Taylor Swift

== T ==
- "Borderline" (2019) by Tame Impala
- "My Foolish Friend" (1983) by Talk Talk
- "marCH" (2018) by Tenacious D
- "No Easy Way Out" (1985) by Robert Tepper
- "Black Eyed Boy" (1997) by Texas
- "Blackjack" (2001) by Tortoise
- "Sixteen Tons" (1947) by Merle Travis
- "Abre la puerta" (1975) by Triana
- "Happy Together" (1967) by The Turtles
- "Never Take It" (2021) by Twenty One Pilots
- "Holding out for a Hero" (1983) by Bonnie Tyler

== U ==
- "Twilight" (1980) by U2
- "Before He Cheats" (2006) by Carrie Underwood
- "Scream" (2012) by Usher

== V ==
- "Lost" by Van Der Graaf Generator
- "Don't Burn The Witch" (1983) by Venom
- "Walk, Don't Run" (1960) by The Ventures
- "Pipeline" by The Ventures

== W ==
- "Aku Bukan Bang Toyib" (2011) by Wali (band)
- "Dicke" (1978) by Marius Müller-Westernhagen
- "Daydream" (1968) by Wallace Collection
- "Gethsemane (I Only Want to Say)" (1970) by Andrew Lloyd Webber and Tim Rice
- "Yank" (2009) by Wali (band)

== Y ==
- "Prostitution" (2020) by Yorushika
- "Like a Hurricane" (1977) by Neil Young

== Z ==
- "In the Year 2525 (Exordium and Terminus)" (1969) by Zager and Evans
- "Je Veux" (2010) by Zaz

== Anonymous ==
- some variations of the children's song “And the Cat Came Back,” such as Fred Penner’s rendition
- “Misirlou”
