= Mannheim sigh =

The Mannheim sigh may refer to:

- Mannheim Sigh, a Mannheim School musical innovation putting more weight on the first of two notes in descending pairs of slurred notes
- Pianto, the motif of a descending minor second, represented laments and associated textually with weeping, sighing, or pain, grief, etc.
