= Descending tetrachord =

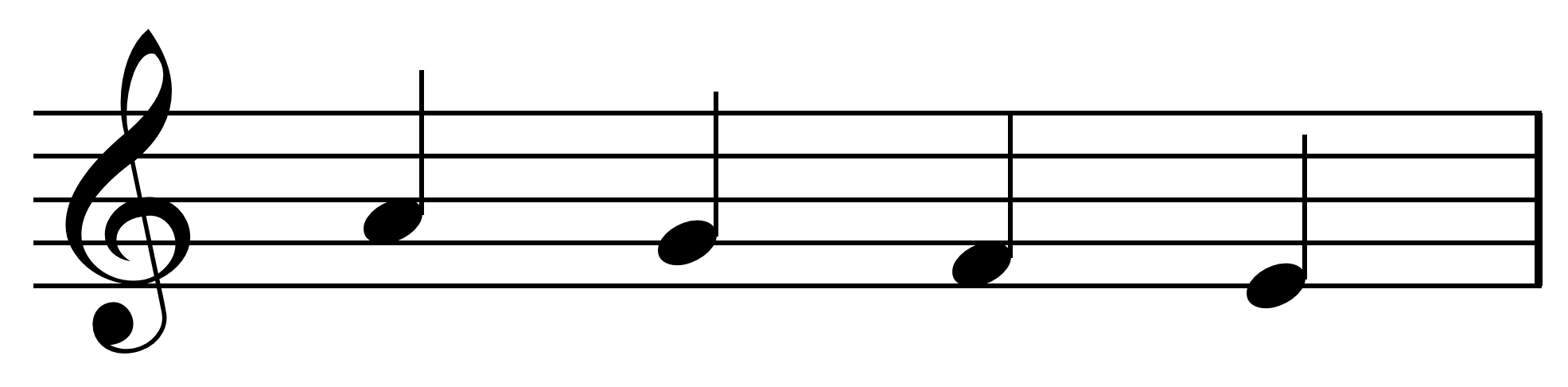
Descending tetrachord in a minor: -♭-♭- (a-g-f-e).

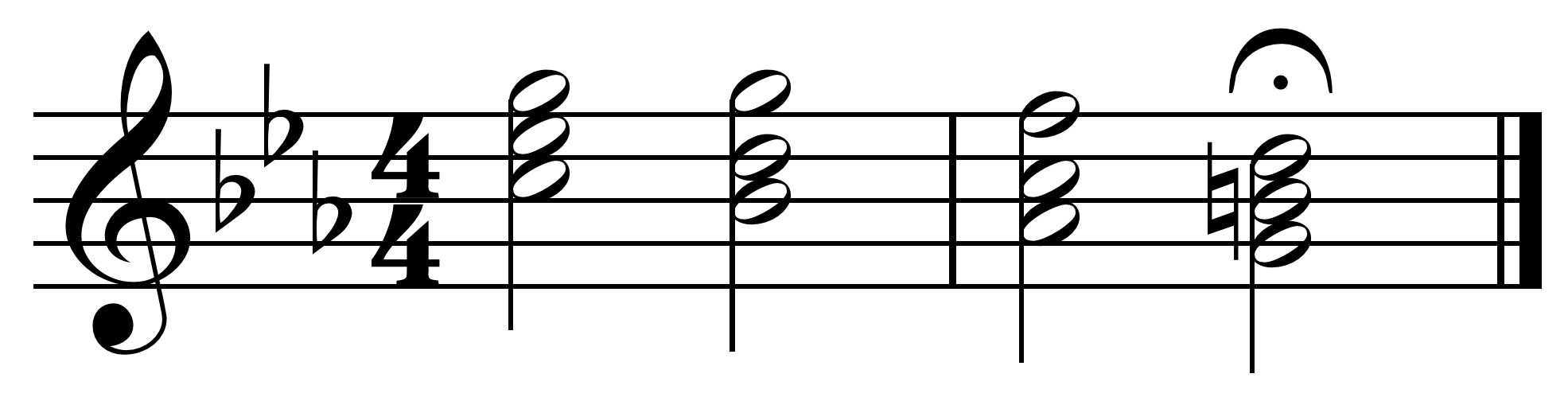
The Phrygian progression creates a descending tetrachord bassline: -♭-♭-. Phrygian half cadence: i-v6-iv6-V in c minor (bassline: c -b♭-a♭-g).

In music theory, the descending tetrachord is a series of four notes from a scale, or tetrachord, arranged in order from highest to lowest, or descending order. For example, -♭-♭-, as created by the Andalusian cadence. The descending tetrachord may fill a perfect fourth or a chromatic fourth.

== See also ==
- Chaconne
- Lament bass
