= Sigh (disambiguation) =

A sigh is an audible exhalation, usually signifying some emotional experience.

Sigh may also refer to:

- Pianto, a musical representation of a sigh
- Sigh (band), a Japanese metal band
- Un Sospiro (English: "A Sigh"), a piano piece by Franz Liszt
- Sigh (film), a 2000 Chinese film directed by Feng Xiaogang

== See also ==
- Sigh of relief
