= Saltus duriusculus =

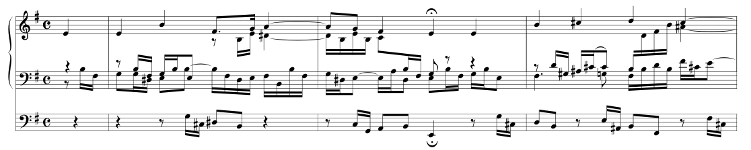
Saltus duriusculi (augmented and diminished fourths and fifths) in Bach's In dich hab ich gehoffet, Herr

In music theory, saltus duriusculus (Latin: 'somewhat hard leap') describes a dissonant leap that is used for rhetorical effect. The term was coined by Christoph Bernhard in his Tractatus compositionis augmentatus.

== See also ==
- Passus duriusculus
