= Lament bass =

Bassline ostinato

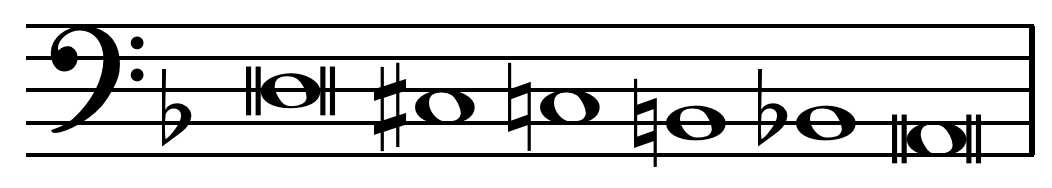
Chromatic fourth: lament bass bassline in Dm (D–C♯–C(♮)–B–B♭–A).

In music, the lament bass is a ground bass, built from a descending perfect fourth from tonic to dominant, with each step harmonized. The diatonic version is the upper tetrachord from the natural minor scale, known as the Phrygian tetrachord, while the chromatic version, the chromatic fourth, has all semitones filled in. It is often used in music to denote tragedy or sorrow.

However, "A common misperception exists that the 'lament bass' of Venetian opera became so prevalent that it immediately swept away all other possible affective associations with this bass pattern...To cite but one example, Peter Holman, writing about Henry Purcell, once characterized the minor tetrachord as 'the descending ground that was associated with love in seventeenth-century opera'."

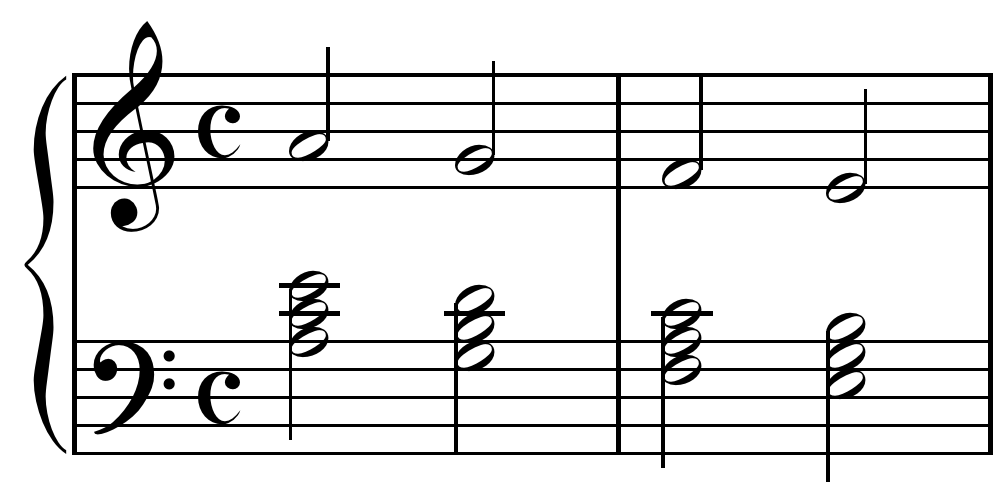
Lament bass without chromatic semitones: descending tetrachord in a minor: –♭–♭– (a–g–f–e). and followed by Phrygian cadence.

Lament bass from Vivaldi's motet "O qui coeli terraeque serenitas" RV 631, Aria No. 2

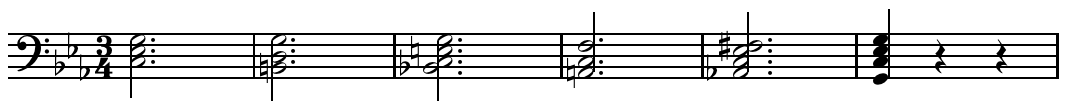
Tonally coherent harmonization from Beethoven's C-Minor Variations. (1806)

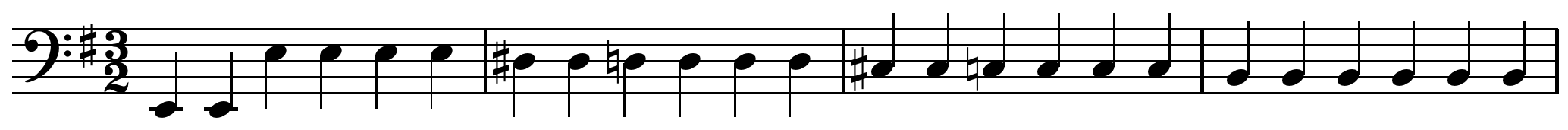
Passacaglia ground bass in Bach's Crucifixus from the Mass in B minor, based on the first choral movement of his 1714 cantata Weinen, Klagen, Sorgen, Zagen, BWV 12

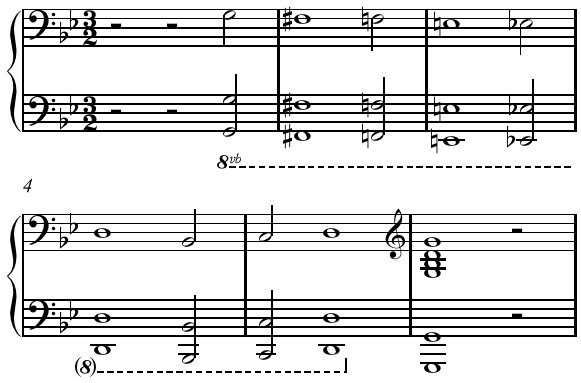
Dido's Lament chromatic fourth ground bass, measures 1–6

== Compositional form ==
There exists a short, free musical form of the Romantic Era, called complaint or "complainte" (Fr.) or lament. It is typically a set of harmonic variations in homophonic texture, wherein the bass descends through some tetrachord, possibly that of the previous paragraph, but usually one suggesting a minor mode. This tetrachord, treated as a very short ground bass, is repeated again and again over the length of the composition.

== Musical works ==
- ”My Funny Valentine” by Rodgers and Hart
- "Any Time at All" by The Beatles (the bass descends C, G/B bass, A, f min/Ab bass, C/G bass)
- "Girl" by The Beatles (the bass descends C, e min/B bass, F/A bass, G7)
- "I'll Be Back" by The Beatles (the bass descends g min, Bb/F bass, Eb, D)
- "Dumbledore's Farewell" from Harry Potter and the Half-Blood Prince
- "Paranoid Android" by Radiohead
- "I'll Follow the Sun" by The Beatles (the bass descends C, e min/B bass, D7/A bass, G7)
- "Magical Mystery Tour" by The Beatles (in the coda, the bass descends D, D/C bass, G/B bass, g min/Bb bass, D/A bass)
- "Lucy in the Sky with Diamonds" by The Beatles (the bass notes in the opening descend A, G, F#, F, E)
- "Michelle" by The Beatles (the bass in the opening descends d min, F aug/C# bass, F/C bass, G/B bass, Bb, A)
- "Dido's Lament" by Henry Purcell
- "Chaconne in F minor" by Johann Pachelbel
- "Lamento della Ninfa" by Claudio Monteverdi
- "Pink Elephants on Parade" from the Disney animated feature film Dumbo
- "Hedwig's Lament", from Hedwig and the Angry Inch
- "I've Got What You Want" and "Tiger, Tiger", from The Apple Tree
- "The Cat Came Back", comic song written by Harry S. Miller in 1893
- "Hit the Road Jack", originally written by Percy Mayfield and popularized by Ray Charles
- "Babe I'm Gonna Leave You" by Joan Baez / Led Zeppelin
- "25 or 6 to 4" by Chicago
- "Dead Leaves and the Dirty Ground" by The White Stripes
- "While My Guitar Gently Weeps" by The Beatles
- "50 Ways to Leave Your Lover" by Paul Simon
- "Sorry Seems to Be the Hardest Word" by Elton John
- "Brain Stew" by Green Day
- "Deer Stop" by Goldfrapp
- "Butterflies and Hurricanes" by Muse
- "Thoughts of a Dying Atheist" by Muse
- "Gethsemane (I Only Want To Say)" from Jesus Christ Superstar by Andrew Lloyd Webber
- "Bills, Bills, Bills" by Destiny's Child
- "Bye Bye Bye" by NSYNC
- "Stray Cat Strut" by The Stray Cats
- "Ruy Blas" Overture, Op. 95" by Felix Mendelssohn
- "Misero Apollo from Gli amori d'Apollo e di Dafne (1640)" by Francesco Cavalli
- "Hor che l'aurora from Egisto (1643)" by Francesco Cavalli
- "Hampstead Incident" by Donovan
- "Wake Me Up When September Ends" by Green Day
- "Matilda Mother" by Pink Floyd

== See also ==
- Andalusian cadence
