= Andalusian cadence =

Chord progression

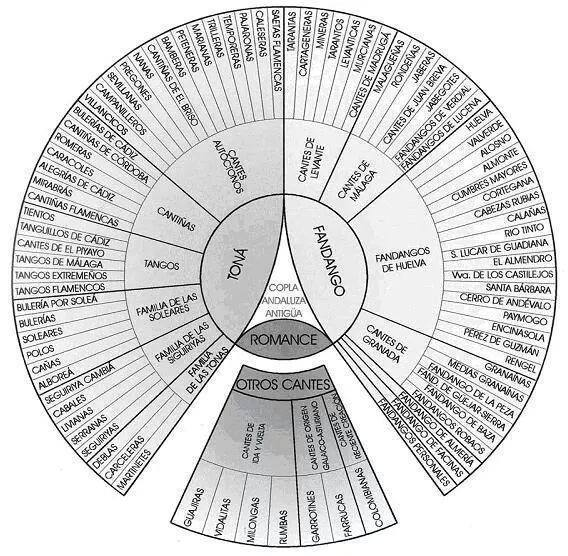
Palos of flamenco

The Andalusian cadence (diatonic phrygian tetrachord) is a term adopted from flamenco music for a chord progression comprising four chords descending stepwise: iv–III–II–I progression with respect to the Phrygian mode or i–♭VII–♭VI–V progression with respect to the Aeolian mode (minor). It is otherwise known as the minor descending tetrachord. Traceable back to the Renaissance, its effective sonorities made it one of the most popular progressions in classical music.

The Andalusian cadence can be regarded as a modulation between the Phrygian mode of a Major parent scale and the Phrygian Dominant mode of a Harmonic Minor scale, e.g. E, F, G (phrygian) or G ♯ (phrygian dominant), A, B, C, D.

Despite the name it is not a true cadence (i.e., occurring only once, when ending a phrase, section, or piece of music); it is most often used as an ostinato (repeating over and over again). It is heard in rock songs such as "Runaway" by Del Shannon.

== Origins ==
A typical Andalusian cadence por arriba (i.e. in A minor). G is the subtonic and G♯ is the leading tone.

A popular melodic pattern of Ancient Greece offers a possible starting point for the Andalusian cadence. Called the Diatonic tetrachord, the sequence resembles the bass line of the chord progression developed centuries later. Some theorists consider that the same structure may have occurred earlier in Judah. A sequence more or less close to the Greek tetrachord structure might have been known to the Moors in Southern Spain and spread from there through Western Europe. The French troubadours were influenced by the Spanish music.

The Andalusian cadence known today, using triads, may not have occurred earlier than the Renaissance, though the use of parallel thirds or sixths was evident as early as the 13th century. One of the earliest uses of this chord sequence is seen in Claudio Monteverdi's choral work, Lamento della Ninfa. The piece begins in A minor and clearly uses the cadence pattern as a basso ostinato, resulting in Amin – Emin – Fmaj – E7. This work was first published in the Eighth Book of Madrigals (1638).

The progression resembles the first four measures of the 15th century Passamezzo antico; i – ♭VII – i – V. The use of the ♭VI chord may suggest a more recent origin than the Passamezzo antico since the cadences i – ♭VII and ♭VII – i were popular in the late Middle Ages and early Renaissance, (see also double tonic) while ♭VII – ♭VI arose as a result of advancement in music theory. However, the absence of the leading tone from the ♭VII chord suggests that the progression originated before the tonal system in the modal approach of the time of Palestrina, where the tonic must be approached from chord V whereas typical Baroque style would have avoided the flat VII and introduced dominant chords (♯VII or V chords, to form cadences resolving upon chord i).

== Analysis ==
=== Melody ===
A minor seventh would be added to the dominant "V" chord to increase tension before resolution (V^{7}–i). The roots of the chords belong to a modern phrygian tetrachord (the equivalent of a Greek Dorian tetrachord, the latter mentioned above), that is to be found as the upper tetrachord of a natural minor scale (for A minor, they are: A G F E).

A remarkable fact about tetrachords was noticed since the Ancient times and rediscovered in early Renaissance: when a tetrachord features a semitone (half-step) between two of its tones, it is the semitone that will determine the melodic tendency of the given tetrachord or mode (when combining tetrachords). If the semitone falls between the highest two steps, the melody tends to be ascending (e.g. major scales); a semitone between the lowest tones in the tetrachord involves a melody "inclined" to descend. This said, the Phrygian tetrachord, borrowed from traditional music of Eastern Europe and Anatolia, is to be found also in the Andalusian cadence and sets the mentioned character (the semitone falls between [the roots of] V and ♭VI).

=== Modal vs. tonal ===
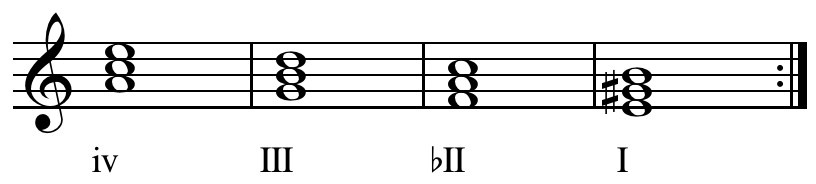
Andalusian cadence in E Phrygian

A rigorous analysis should note that many chord progressions are likely to come from an epoch prior to early Baroque (usually associated with birth of tonality). In such cases (also, that of the Andalusian cadence), explanations offered by tonality "neglect" the history and evolution of the chord progression in question. This is because harmonic analyses in tonal style use only two scales (major and minor) when explaining origins of chord moves. In exchange, the luxuriant modal system (i.e., the entirety of musical modes ever created and their specific harmonies – if existing) offers various plausible origins and explanations for every chord move. However, most classical (Baroque or subsequent) and popular music which makes use of the given chord progression might treat it itself in a tonal manner.

A number of musicians and theorists (including renowned guitarist Manolo Sanlúcar) consider the Andalusian cadence as a chord progression built upon the Phrygian mode. Since tonality took the first chord in the progression for a tonic ("i"), the Phrygian notation (modal) of the cadence writes as following: iv – ♭III – ♭II – I (or, more commonly, but less correctly, iv – III – II – I). Though tonal functions have little in common with the Phrygian mode, the four chords could be roughly equalized. (The Phrygian mode is like a natural minor with step two lowered; however, step three switches between major and minor third, an equivalent to the subtonic/leading tone conflict in the tonal acceptation.) Thus, the "iv" corresponds to a subdominant chord, while "♭III" is the mediant and "I" is the tonic. The "♭II" chord has a dominant function, and may be thought of as a tritone substitution of "V", i.e., the Neapolitan sixth chord. (The only purpose for highlighting these "functions" is to compare between the modal and tonal views of the cadence. The mode involved in the cadence is not a pure Phrygian, but one whose third step occurs in both instances, minor and major third. This is unacceptable in tonality; hence, tonal functions cannot be used. A common mistake occurs when the given mode is thought of as major, given that the tonic chord is major. However, the Phrygian mode features a minor third and the "I" chord may be taken for a borrowed chord, i.e., a Picardy third.)

When the VI chord, which may be added between III and ♭II (iv–III–VI–♭II–I) and cadenced upon, is the most characteristic contrasting tonal area, similar by analogy to the relative major of a minor key.

Another modification gives the progression a more characteristically modal sound by simply replacing the VII with a vii chord. This alters the progression slightly; Amin – Gmin – Fmaj – E7. It can be found in "Chanela", by DiMeola / McLaughlin / De Lucia. Although this example is in the key of B minor, the applied principle is the same.

=== Harmonic peculiarities ===
The tonal system sets three main functions for the diatonic tertian chords: tonic (T), dominant (D) and subdominant (SD). Any sequence through different functions is allowed (e.g. T→D, SD→D), except for D→SD. A tonal scale's degrees are as following: "I" and "VI" are tonic chords (of which, "I" is stronger; all final cadences end in "I"), "V" and "VII" are dominant function (both feature the leading tone and "V" is more potent), "IV" and "II" are subdominant function chords ("IV" is stronger). ("III" isn't given a precise function, although it may replace a dominant in some cases.) All sequences between same-function chords, from the weaker member to the stronger (e.g. VII – V), are forbidden. When using the natural minor, dominant function chords exchange their leading tone for a subtonic; as a result, their dominant quality is strongly undermined.

A tonal insight on the Andalusian cadence leads to considering the "♭VII" a local exception: the subtonic it uses for a root should be, however, re-replaced by the leading tone before returning to "i". (The leading tone is heard in the "V" chord, as the chord's major third.) A "♭VII" would leave the dominant category (compare: "♮VII") and start acting to the contrary. That is, a "♭VII" chord would now prefer moving to a subdominant rather than to a tonic chord. Yet, the Andalusian cadence brings about a limit condition for tonal harmony, with a ♭VII – ♭VI chord move.

The Andalusian is an authentic cadence, because a dominant chord ("V") comes just before the tonic "i". (Using modal harmonies, the third, and not the fourth chord – "♭II" – acts as the dominant, substituted to tritone. Even so, the cadence stays authentic. The fourth chord itself is the tonic, so the cadence need not return to the tonal tonic, i.e. modal "iv".)

== Denominations in flamenco music ==
=== Basic keys ===
The standard tuning in guitars causes most flamenco music to be played only in a few keys. Of those, the most popular are A minor and D minor (equivalent to E and A Phrygian, respectively). They are as follows:

- por arriba, which corresponds to A minor, where an Andalusian cadence consists of the chord progression Am – G – F – E
- por medio names the D minor key, in which the Andalusian cadence is built from a Dm – C – B♭ – A progression

=== Derivative keys ===
Using a capotasto or scordature, other keys can be obtained, mainly derived from the two basic keys. Flamenco guitarist Ramón Montoya and singer Antonio Chacón were among the first to use the new keys, which have distinctive names:

Term used in flamenco	Tonal key	Modal (Phrygian) key	Chord progression	Construction
por granaína	E minor	B Phrygian	Em – D – C – B	por medio, capo on 2nd fret
por Levante	B minor	F♯ Phrygian	Bm – A – G – F♯	por arriba, capo on 2nd fret
por minera	C♯ minor	G♯ Phrygian	C♯m – B – A – G♯	por arriba, capo on 4th fret
por rondeña	F♯ minor	C♯ Phrygian	F♯m – E – D – C♯	scordature

== Music examples featuring Andalusian cadences ==
=== Classical music ===
One of the better-known pieces in the common-practice era to feature the Andalusian cadence is the Chaconne from Bach's second violin partita in D minor.

A piece that does not use the cadence as an ostinato, yet opens with a variation upon it (i – i (♭7) ^{4}_{2} – ♭VI – iv – V ^{6–5}_{4–3}); hence the bass being ^1, ^♭7, ^♭6, [^4], ^5), is the first movement of Beethoven's 'Moonlight' Sonata.

=== Popular music ===
Songs of the early 1960s, such as the Ventures' 1960 hit "Walk, Don't Run", used the bass structure from the iconic Andalusian cadence for an Instroband hit; however, the first chord is A Major not A minor as is a common misconception about the song. Other notable examples from popular music are "Stray Cat Strut" by The Stray Cats, "Good Vibrations" by The Beach Boys, "Like a Hurricane" by Neil Young, "Happy Together" by The Turtles, "California Dreamin" by The Mamas and the Papas, and "Sultans of Swing" by Dire Straits.

The Andalusian cadence is featured in the chorus of Michael Jackson's "Smooth Criminal", and it also builds the basis for the middle section in Paco de Lucía's signature track, "Entre dos Aguas", where this progression is played in the key of E minor.

In addition, the I–♭VII–♭VI–V chord progression is the primary structure of "Hit the Road Jack".

An interesting variation/extension on the cadence appears in the rideout of The Beatles' "I Am The Walrus" (beginning at 3:17). (This rideout is itself an example of a Shepard scale, in which a bass line and a treble line move unceasingly in contrary motion.) The rideout begins with what might be called a double Andalusian cadence in the bass: E, D, C, B; A, G, F, E. Yet after these eight measures, the Andalusian 'cycle' is one step "off", and the new 'cadence' is D, C, B, A. Normally, continuing this procedure, it would take until the fifth repetition of this two-cadence cycle to reach another Andalusian tetrachord (with intervals whole, whole, half). But the Beatles and producer George Martin pull off a deft bit of legerdemain during this second set of tetrachords: they break the cycle while apparently continuing it. At 3:55, Ringo Starr plays a fill, changing the pattern and marking the next chord change (to D) as an arrival. After this, the four-chord pattern is apparently shifted to the alternate pattern D, C, B, A; G, F, E, D (with intervals whole, half, whole); yet through subtle accentual maneuvering, this eight-change pattern 'fits' within seven changes, and D somehow appears to always begin a cycle. (One might also maintain that any regularity is now broken entirely, and the changes have become an unending Möbius strip.)

=== Modern flamenco usage ===
The integration of the traditional Andalusian cadence and Renaissance-style practices of musical composition and song are evident in modern musical genres such as rock and pop. Flamenco music, a style of music and dance that was popularized in the Andalusian regions of Spain, has also been incorporated into modern pop and rock music. Specific examples include the usage of the cadence in "La leyenda del tiempo" by Camarón de la Isla. Other recent uses of the cadence are apparent in flamenco inspired rock songs such as "Ya no me asomo de la reja", 'La que vive en la Carrera", and the bassline of "Negras las intenciones".

== Altered progressions ==
- Reordered or repeated chords
  - "California Dreamin'" (1965) by The Mamas & the Papas, where two chords have changed places: i (– i_{2}) – VI – VII – V^{5}_{4–3}. (Note: the "i_{2}" notation represents a tonic chord whose seventh falls in the bass; a "^{5}_{4–3}" notation suggests a suspended chord resolving to a triad)
- Foreign chords, bassline unchanged
  - A secondary dominant added before the VI chord: Am–G^{7}–C–F–E.
- Dominant chord substituted
  - A most unusual way of altering the cadence can be heard in Pink Floyd's "Comfortably Numb" (1979), where the "V" chord is skipped for a "iv". It is as follows: i – VII – VI (– VI_{2}) – iv (and back to "i"). The resulting progression is on the edge between tonal and modal, where the subtonic doesn't change back into a leading-tone, but the obtained cadence is suitable for tonality (called plagal or backdoor).

== See also ==
- Lament bass
- ii–V–I progression
- Flamenco mode
- List of popular music songs featuring Andalusian cadences
