= Dido's Lament =

Aria from Henry Purcell's opera Dido and Aeneas

Lea Desandre performs "Dido's Lament" with Les Arts Florissants in 2020

Dido's Lament ("When I am laid in earth") is the closing aria from the opera Dido and Aeneas by Henry Purcell to a libretto by Nahum Tate.

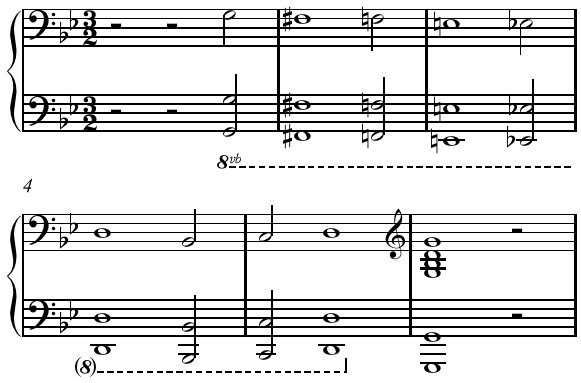
Dido's Lament chromatic fourth ground bass, measures 1–6

It is included in many classical music textbooks to illustrate the descending chromatic fourth (passus duriusculus) in the ground bass. A version is played annually in London by the massed bands of the Guards Division at the Cenotaph remembrance parade in Whitehall on Remembrance Sunday, the Sunday nearest to 11 November (Armistice Day).

== The Aeneid ==
Opening

The text, as well as Purcell's opera, is based on the Aeneid, the Roman epic poem by Virgil about the Trojan warrior Aeneas, travelling to Italy from the fallen Troy in order to settle there and secure his son Ascanius's lineage. Their ship is blown off course from Sicily, and they land on the shore of North Africa in Carthage, a town newly settled by refugees from Tyre. Aeneas falls in love with their queen, Dido, but dutifully departs for Italy, leaving her. Distraught at his betrayal, she orders a pyre to be built and set ablaze so that Aeneas will see from his ship that she has killed herself. She sings the lament before stabbing herself as Aeneas sails on.

== Analysis ==
The opening secco recitative, "Thy hand, Belinda", is accompanied by continuo only. Word painting is applied on the text "darkness" and "death" which is presented with chromaticism, symbolising death and descent into the grave.

The ground bass opening "Dido's Lament" forms a chromatic stepwise descent over the interval of a perfect fourth, the chromatic fourth,

which is repeated eleven times throughout the aria, thus structuring the piece in the form of a passacaglia. The metre is 3/2 in the key of G minor.

Purcell has applied word painting on the words "laid", which is also given a descending chromatic line portraying death and agony,

and "remember me", which is presented in a syllabic text setting and repeated

with its last presentation leaping in register with a sudden crescendo

displaying her desperate cry with urgency as she prepares for her fate: death. In one interpretation, Dido's relationship with Aeneas is portrayed in this moment as an "apocalyptic romance".

== Text ==
Recitative
Thy hand, Belinda, darkness shades me,
On thy bosom let me rest,
More I would, but Death invades me;
Death is now a welcome guest.

Aria
When I am laid, am laid in earth, May my wrongs create
No trouble, no trouble in thy breast;
Remember me, remember me, but ah! forget my fate.
Remember me, but ah! forget my fate.

== Influence and use ==
The conductor Leopold Stokowski wrote a transcription of the piece for symphony orchestra. This is the version heard at the annual Armistice Day ceremony in London.

The opening movement of the American composer Gloria Coates's 4th Symphony, "Chiaroscuro", paraphrases the lament.
