= The Cat Came Back =

1893 comic song written by Harry S. Miller

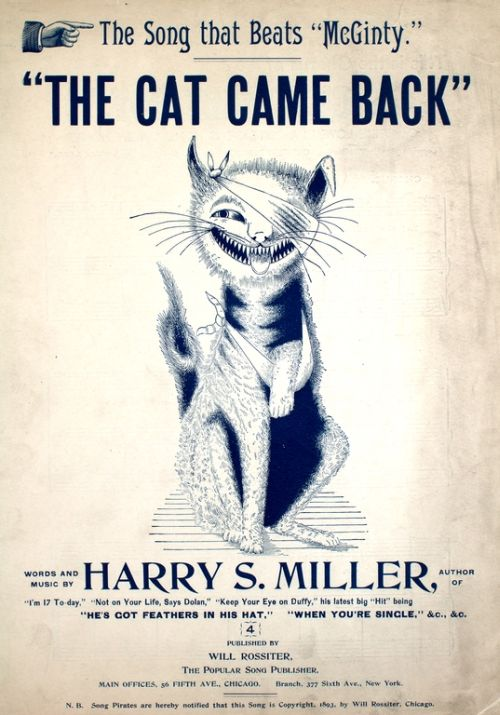
- Cover, sheet music, 1893

Song
- Language: English
- Written: 1893
- Published: Christmas, 1893
- Genre: Blues-folk, children's music, gallows comedy
- Songwriter: Harry S. Miller
- Composer: Harry S. Miller
- Lyricist: Harry S. Miller

"The Cat Came Back" is a blues-folk gallows comedy song about an indestructible cat written by Harry S. Miller in 1893. It has since entered the world of folklore and became a famous children's song.

== Theme ==
The song tells a scary story about "old Mister Johnson" who had a "yaller cat" which kept coming back when he tried to get rid of it:

But the cat came back, he couldn't stay no long-er,
Yes the cat came back de very next day,
the cat came back—thought she were a goner,
But the cat came back for it wouldn't stay away.

Throughout the song, Mr. Johnson tries disposing of the animal in a variety of perilous ways. In one verse, he gives it to someone riding in a balloon, a trip that ends when the balloon drops far away with the person's whereabouts unknown. In another, a neighbor tries killing the cat with a shotgun, but accidentally blows himself up instead ("97 pieces of the man is all they found..."). Additional verses see Mr. Johnson handing the cat over to a man travelling west on a train that soon derails, killing everyone onboard except the cat; a little boy with a dollar riding up a river in his boat (which leads to the boy drowning and the river being dragged, while the cat, who had a rope tied around its neck, escapes unharmed), and a ship sailing across the ocean (an incoming gust of wind results in every passenger dying, but the cat survives). One verse reveals that the cat has a family of seven kittens, until a cyclone destroys its home and the kittens are blown around, never to be seen again.

In Miller's original, the cat finally died when an organ grinder came around one day and:

De cat look'd around awhile an' kinder raised her head
When he played Ta-rah-dah-boom-da-rah, an' de cat dropped dead.

Even then, the cat's ghost came back.

The first commercial recording of the song was c. 1894 for the Columbia Phonograph Company, Washington, D.C., performed by Charles Marsh. "The Cat Came Back" was later recorded by Fiddlin' John Carson (OKeh catalog #40119) in April 1924. Other early recordings include one by Dock Philipine "Fiddlin' Doc" Roberts ("And the Cat Came Back the Very Next Day", Gennett 3235), on November 13, 1925.

The original sheet music described the song as "A Comic Negro Absurdity" on the back page and provided an additional eight verses as well as a final chorus. A 1900 London edition of the sheet music described it as "A Nigger Absurdity" on the cover sheet.

== Timing of the song ==
The song's combination of a strong and consistent beat pattern with amusing and humorous lyrics suit it well for use in teaching the concepts of rhythm and tempo to children.

Like many children's songs, the song has a strong, well-defined beat pattern. Its rhythm consists of alternating strong and weak beats, so it is often sung in 2/4 time or cut time, although in its original sheet-music printing it is notated in 4/4 ("common") time. Accordingly, it can be (and often is) sung while walking, for example, timing the left or right footfall to coincide with a strong beat and the other footfall to coincide with a weak beat. In the process, the song also lends itself to demonstration of a "walking" bass line such as the descending roots of the simple i–VII–VI–V "Andalusian" minor-key chord progression, with which minor-key versions of the song's melody are compatible.

== Versions of the song ==
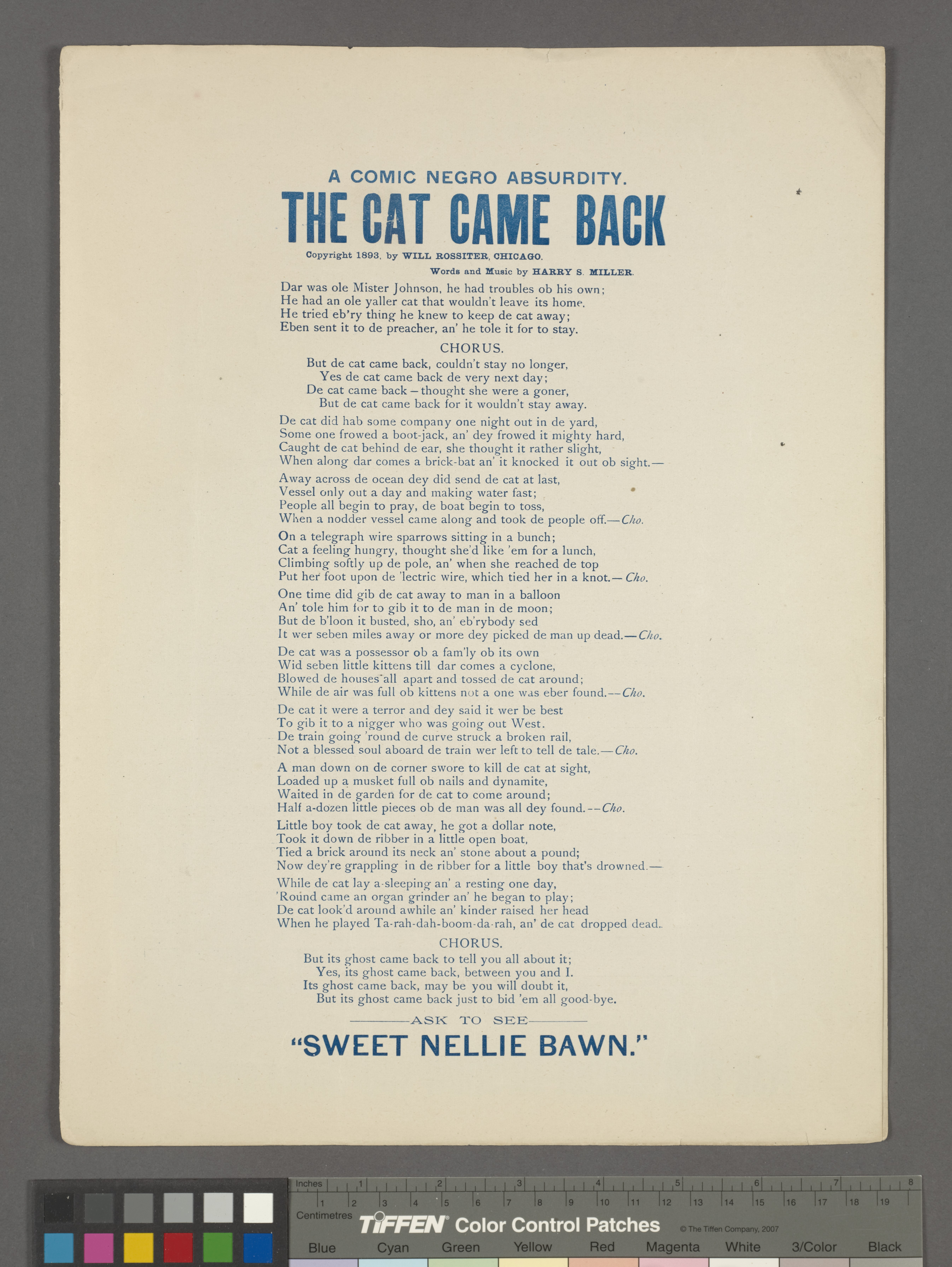
Lyrics of the original version by Harry S. Miller.

There are many versions of the song, which have removed the racist elements of the lyrics and song title. One such variation goes something like:

First verse

Now old Mr. Johnson had troubles of his own,
He had a yellow cat that wouldn't leave his home,
He tried and he tried to give the cat away,
He gave it to a man going far away.

Chorus

But the cat came back the very next day,

The cat came back, we thought he was a goner,

The cat came back, he just wouldn't stay away.

Alternative chorus

But the cat came back he wouldn't stay away,

He was sitting on the porch the very next day.

Every second beat is emphasized (emphasized beats are shown underlined in bold).

Each line of text in the above has eight beats, and usually the chords fall (piano) or begin (organ) on the capitalized words.

The chord progression repeats every 8 beats, so one might think of the song as being in either 2/ time or 8/ time (whichever denominator is used for reference time, i.e. 2/4 or 8/4 time if the beat is a quarter note, etc.). The pattern of 2/ and 8/ is similar to the beat pattern in "Twinkle Twinkle Little Star", but phase-shifted by 180 degrees (since the song starts on a weak beat rather than the strong beat beginning of "Twinkle Twinkle").

A later version of the song emerged during the Cold War, in which the final verse made references to the "atom bomb" and "H-bomb", and the subsequent destruction of the human race, which the cat survived.

The Learning Station wrote a kid-friendly version of the song as part of their Kid's Country Song & Dance CD, in which the cat gets adopted by a loving little girl at the end of the song.

== Variations in the melody of the additional verses ==
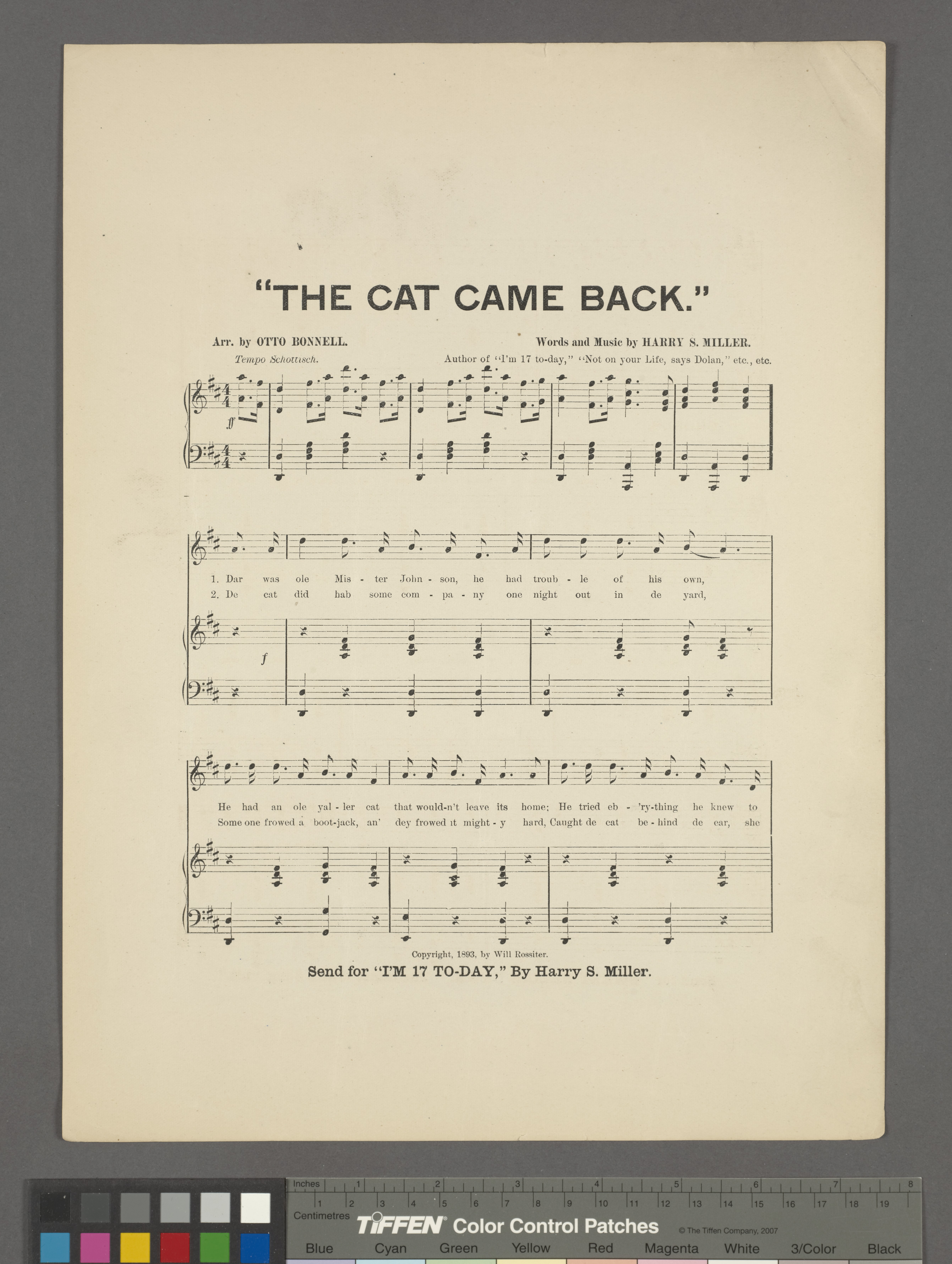
Original sheet music by Harry S. Miller.

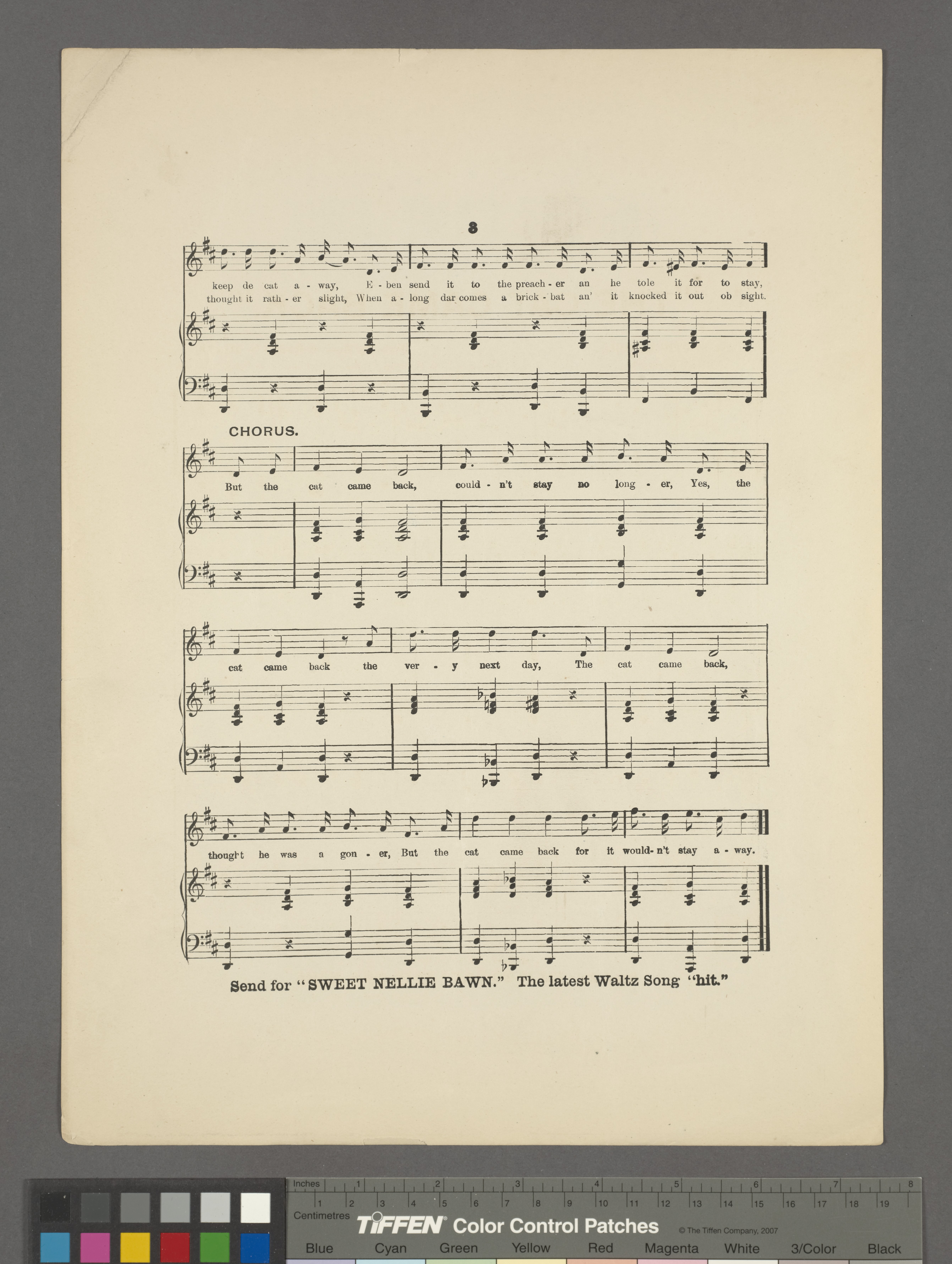
Original sheet music by Harry S. Miller. (Second page)

The additional verses often have a notable variation in melody but with the same chords. For example, the second verse often shoots up an octave to emphasize the words "dynamite" and "found" (each sung an octave above the first note of the song, which is "E" if the song is sung in the key of A-minor), even though the first verse does not shoot up that way

The third verse often contains a descending scale that does not appear in the first or second verses.

== Microtonal and chirp-based versions of the chorus ==
Also, the second line of the chorus "thought he was a goner" is often sung either off-key (deliberately), or just spoken (not sung), or includes chirps or quarter tones (notes that fall between semitones). In some versions the chirps can be approximated by a chromatic glissando.

== Bass line ==
=== Harmonic minor variations ===
The chord progression lends itself to a bass line that is natural minor descending, and harmonic minor ascending, i.e. in the key of A-minor, the 8 beats (in 8/ time) would play out as A, A, G, G, F, F, E, G♯. This is practically the lament bass used in many chaconnes, e.g. Pachelbel's Chaconne in F minor.

=== Melodic minor variations ===
Additionally, the bass line may be played as melodic minor (i.e. including both an F♯ and a G♯ on the way up). This second variation is effective in teaching children the concept of a melodic minor scale, since melodic minor otherwise occurs so seldom in simple children's songs.

== Cordell Barker's animated film ==
Although the Barker animation does not involve many spoken lyrics, relying more on its animation to show the action, both spoken verses, as shown here, are different than other versions:

Now, old Mr. Johnson had troubles of his own.
He had a yellow cat that wouldn't leave his home!
A special plan with deception as the key.
One little cat—how hard could it be?

and

Well, old Mr. Johnson had troubles of his own.
Still the yellow cat wouldn't leave his home!
Steps were needed to remove the little curse.
The old man knew it couldn't get any worse.

== Translation ==
=== French ===
The song has been translated in 1970 by Steve Waring, a French-American author, under the title "Le matou revient" (a follow-up song has even been written in 2008 by the same author).

=== German ===
The song has been translated in the late 1970s into a German dialect, spoken in southwestern Germany around Saarbrücken. Its punch line is political: After the fall of atomic and hydrogen bombs, the whole world decays, including the Saar region, but the cat survives. Erich Steiner, university professor for Anglistics, is cited as translator by folk musician Jürgen Brill. Meanwhile, there exists another version in the similar dialect from Idar-Oberstein; here, the political statement has been removed.

== Parody ==
On their summer 2011 album The Truth Is..., Canadian rock band Theory of a Deadman released the track "Bitch Came Back", which is derived from the original folk song with altered lyrics about a troublesome, nagging girlfriend.
