= Chromatic fourth =

Type of melody or melodic fragment

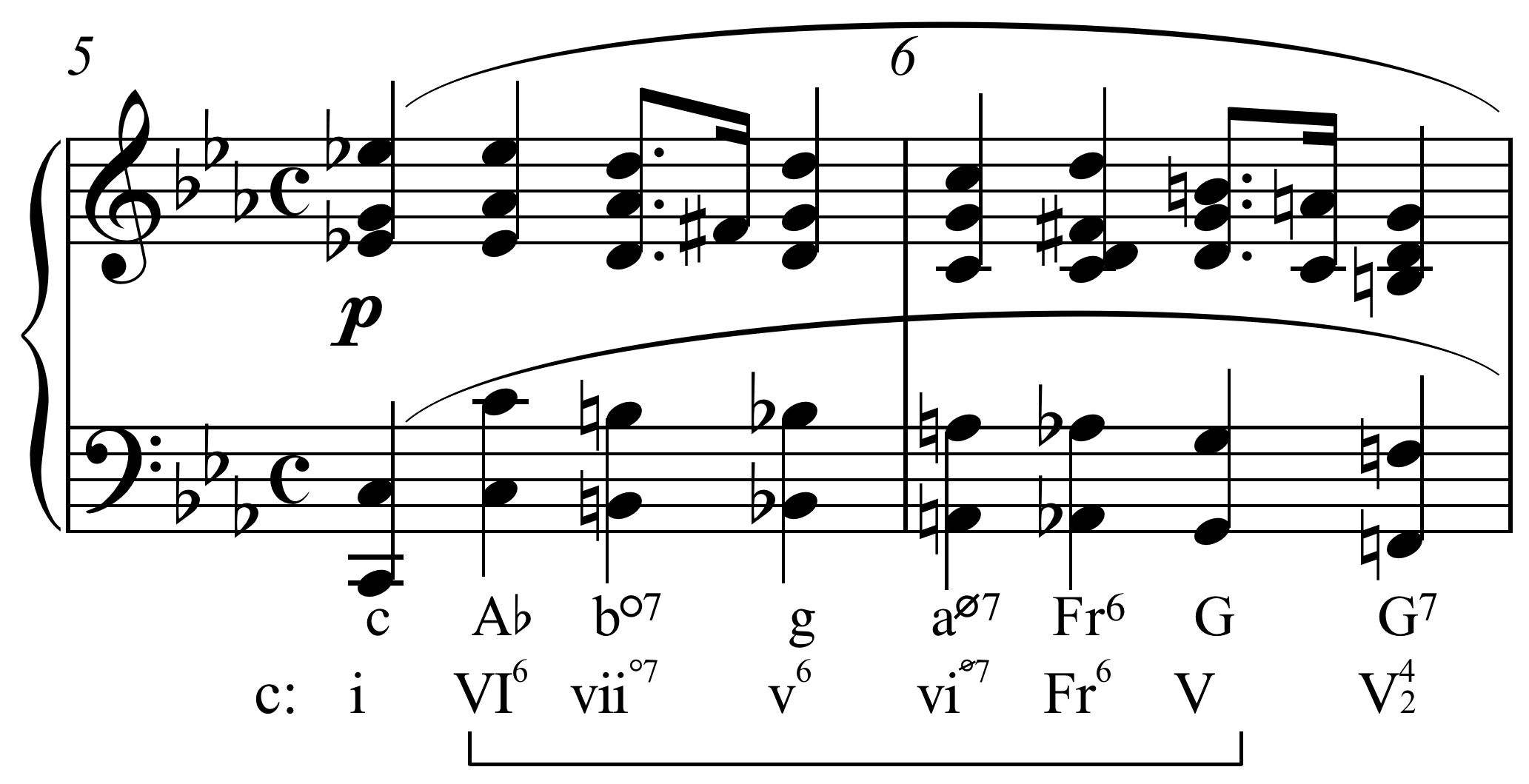
Chromatic run from Chopin's Prelude in C Minor, mm.5-6.

In music theory, a chromatic fourth, or passus duriusculus, is a melody or melodic fragment spanning a perfect fourth with all or almost all chromatic intervals filled in (chromatic line). The quintessential example is in D minor with the tonic and dominant notes as boundaries:

The chromatic fourth was first used in the madrigals of the 16th century. The Latin term itself—"harsh" or "difficult" (duriusculus) "step" or "passage" (passus)—originates in Christoph Bernhard's 17th-century Tractatus compositionis augmentatus (1648–49), where it appears to refer to repeated melodic motion by semitone creating consecutive semitones. The term may also relate to the pianto associated with weeping. In the Baroque, Johann Sebastian Bach used it in his choral as well as his instrumental music, in the Well-Tempered Clavier, for example (the chromatic fourth is indicated by the red notes):

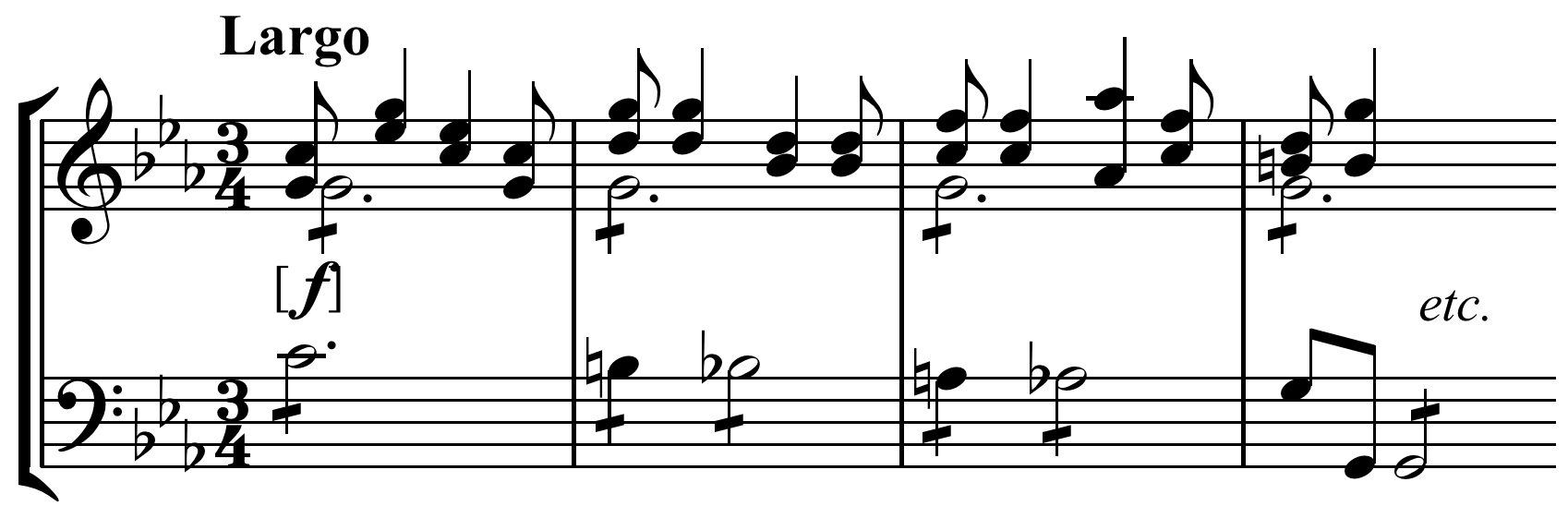
Lament bass from Vivaldi's motet "O qui coeli terraeque serenitas" RV 631, Aria No. 2 In operas of the Baroque and Classical, the chromatic fourth was often used in the bass and for woeful arias, often being called a "lament bass". In the penultimate pages of the first movement of Beethoven's Ninth Symphony, the chromatic fourth appears in the cellos and basses..

This does not mean that the chromatic fourth was always used in a sorrowful or foreboding way, or that the boundaries should always be the tonic and dominant notes. One counterexample comes from the Minuet of Wolfgang Amadeus Mozart's String Quartet in G major, K. 387 (the chromatic fourths are conveniently bracketed by the slurs and set apart with note-to-note dynamics changes):

== Musical works using the chromatic fourth or passus duriusculus ==
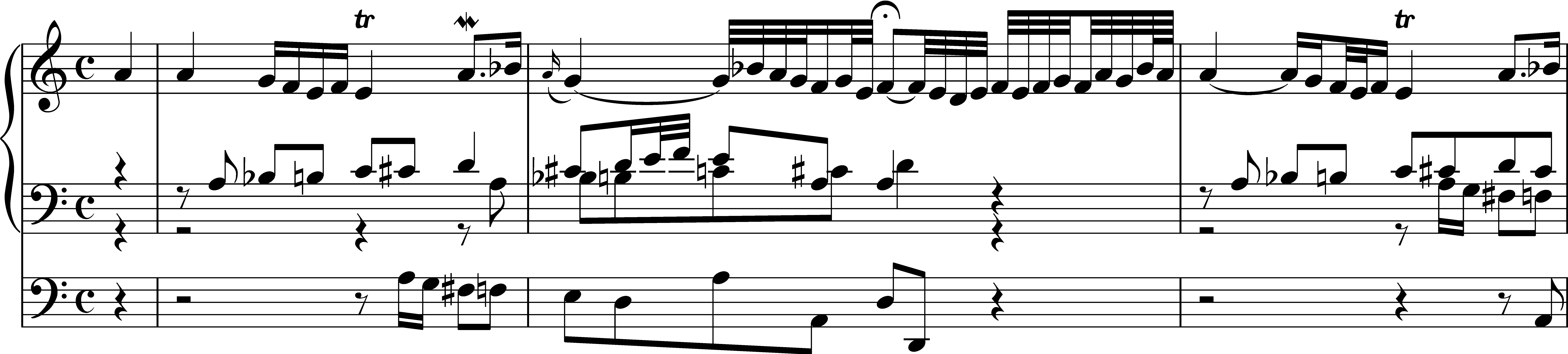
In the organ chorale prelude BWV 614, there are chromatic fourths in the three accompanying voices

- Henry Purcell, "Dido's Lament"
- Robert de Visée, Suite in C minor : Sarabande
- J. S. Bach, Mass in B minor, Crucifixus, also BWV 12, "Weinen, Klagen, Sorgen, Zagen"
- J. S. Bach, BWV 78: "Jesu, der du meine Seele"
- J. S. Bach, BWV 150: "Nach Dir, Herr, verlanget mich" (in the first choral, and a reverse, whole note upwards melody in the final Chaconne)
- J. S. Bach, Orgelbüchlein, BWV 614: "Das Alte Jahr vergangen ist" (in the three accompanying voices)
- J. S. Bach, Invention No. 9 in F minor, BWV 795 (second subject)
- J. S. Bach, Prelude and Fugue in C-sharp minor, BWV 849, second voice in bar 69, soprano in bar 71
- J. S. Bach, Prelude and Fugue in E minor, BWV 855, fugue subject
- J. S. Bach, Prelude and Fugue in A minor, BWV 889, Prelude subject
- J. S. Bach, Prelude and Fugue in E minor, BWV 548, the widening chromatic character of the fugue subject lends the work the subtitle "The Wedge".
- J. S. Bach, Toccata in E minor, BWV 914, fugue subject
- W. A. Mozart, K. 594: "Stück für ein Orgelwerk in einer Uhr"
- Ludwig van Beethoven, Symphony No. 9, ending of first movement
- Frédéric Chopin, No. 20 from 24 Preludes, Op. 28
- Hector Berlioz, Requiem, Op. 5
- César Franck, Prelude, Chorale and Fugue
