= Harry S. Miller =

American lyricist, composer and playwright

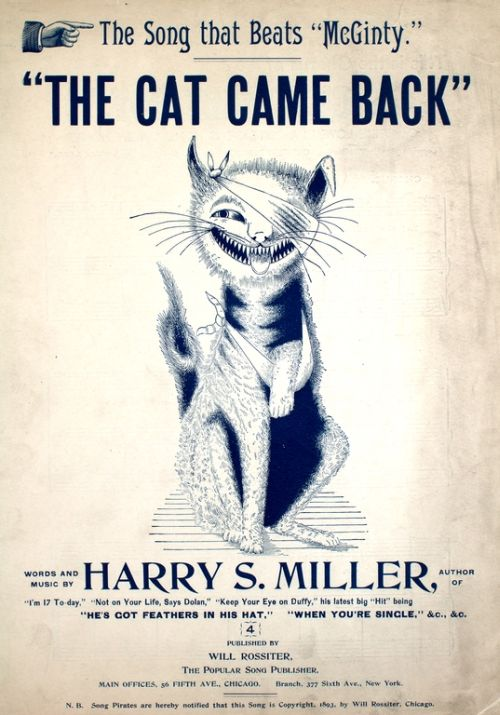
Sheet music cover for "The Cat Came Back" (1893)

Harry S. Miller (born 1867 – January 5, 1934) was an American lyricist, composer, and sometimes playwright who lived in New York and Chicago in the 19th and early 20th centuries and is best known for his song "The Cat Came Back", published in 1893.

== Life ==
Born in Philadelphia on April 4, 1860 and died in Brooklyn New York on January 5, 1934. He moved to New York City in 1896 to further his career as a lyricist.

Miller's songs were part of Tin Pan Alley, and were sold to various TPA entertainers (for example, vaudeville entertainer Tony Pastor popularized The Cat Came Back, Dan W. Quinn recorded He's Got Feathers in his Hat for the North American Phonograph Company around 1895, and Edward M. Favor popularized I'll Not Go Out with Reilly Any More). He specialized in quatrains and often wrote using a Georgian Black dialect, though Miller was white. His contemporaries credited him with the popularization of the terms of endearment "honey" and "baby" in African-American English and the spread of coon songs, as well as the phrase, "Got troubles of my own".

In 1898, Miller wrote The Insurance Agent: An Eccentric Character and Comedy Sketch, a two-man play.

Harry married Mary Agnes Marlborough in Philadelphia in 1891 She was also born in Philadelphia. They had four children: Mabel, born in 1893, the year The Cat Came Back was published, Harry Somers Miller, Jr., born in 1894 but died in 1900; Jessie Irene was born in 1898 and died the next year; Louis George, born in 1896 and died in 1970. Louis had three children, Harold, Evelyn and Shirley, who died in infancy. Harold and Evelyn each had children, including daughters, Marilyn Ribaudo Davis and Linda Miller, They have memories of their grandfather Louis and stories of their great grandfather Harry S., the songwriter. They were told that he wrote The Cat Came Back. He also published some 200 songs in his lifetime along with over 50 humorous verses and at least a dozen plays.

In the mid-1880s Miller began publishing songs, verse and humorous sketches in his hometown Philadelphia paper, Taggarts’ Sunday Times.

Harry S. Miller’s wife Mary Agnes died in 1917, age 47. Harry lived another seventeen years. He died in Brooklyn on January 5, 1934, age 67. His cause of death was listed as arterio sclerosis [sic] with valvular heart disease with drophy [sic]. His occupation was listed as Retired Music Schoman. He is buried next to Mary Agnes.

== Works ==
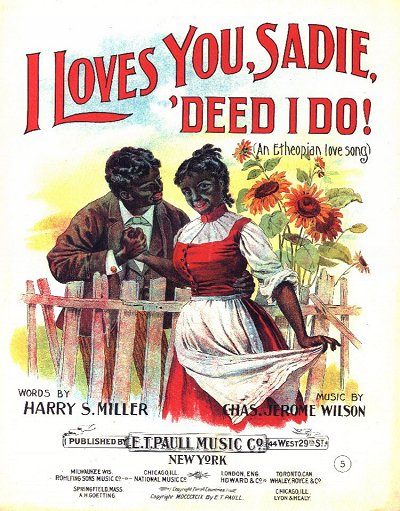
Cover of Harry S. Miller's I Loves You Sadie, 'Deed I Do! (1899).

=== Songs ===
- Barney's Parting (1883)
- It's All Right Now (1892)
- The Cat Came Back: A Nigger Absurdity (1893)
- Can't Lose Me, Charlie (1893)
- He's Got Feather's in His Hat (1893)
- A Cruel Hiss (1894)
- You Can't Repay Your Mother (1894)
- If They'd Only Write and Ask Me to Come Home (1895)
- Down in Hogan's Alley (1896)
- He's Goin' to Hab a Hot Time Bye an' Bye (1898; music by Edward Taylor Paull)
- Tell Me that You Love Me Like You Used to Do (1898; music by Emily Smith)
- This Wedding Cannot Be (1898)
- Bring Your Money Home (1899)
- Down Old New England Way (1899; music by Emily Smith)
- I Loves Your Sadie, 'Deed I Do!: An Etheopian Love Song (1899; music by Charles Jerome Wilson)
- I'll Not Go Out with Reilly Any More (1900)
- Oh Joe, Dear Joe (1901)
- The Old Virginia Home (1908; music by Emily Smith)

Many of his songs have been lost, along with their date of publication, including:

- For Your Mother's Sake
- I'm 17 To-day
- Keep Your Eye on Duffy
- Let Her Come Home Again
- My Sister's Beau
- Not on Your Life, Says Dolan
- She's Still Your Wife
- The Telephone Girl
- The Waterbury Watch
- When You're Single

=== Other ===
- The Insurance Agent: An Eccentric Character and Comedy Sketch (1898)

== See also ==
- Coon song
- Tin Pan Alley
