= Pianto =

Musical motif of a descending minor second

In music, the pianto (from Italian: pianto [ˈpjan.to], meaning "crying" or "weeping") is the motif of a descending minor second, has represented laments and been associated textually with weeping, sighing (called the Mannheim sigh by Hugo Riemann); or pain, grief, etc.; since the 16th century. For example, the passus duriusculus. "It was present equally in vocal and instrumental music."

== See also ==
- Lament bass
