= List of Iraqi musicians =

This is a list of Iraqi/Mesopotamian musicians and musical groups.

== Classical ==
- Nazem Al Ghazali
- Yusuf Za'arur
- Afifa Iskandar
- Salima Pasha
- Munir Bashir
- Jamil Bachir
- Naseer Shamma
- Omar Bashir
- Rahim AlHaj
- Sahar Taha
- Zaidoon Treeko
- Salman Shukur
- Ahmed Mukhtar
- Ashur Bet Sargis
- Hanna Petros
- Paulus Khofri
- Farida Mohammad Ali
- Linda George
- Amal Khudhair
- Aida Nadeem
- Seta Hagopian
- Simor Jalal
- Solhi al-Wadi
- Hamid al-Saadi
- Saleh and Daoud al-Kuwaity

=== Classical/modern ===
- Ilham al-Madfai
- Haitham Yousif
- Kadim Al Sahir
- Rida Al Abdullah
- Hatem Al Iraqi
- Sahar Al Basri
- Qassim Al Sultan
