= Mustafa Al-Abdullah =

Iraqi musician (born 1989)

- مصطفى العبد الله
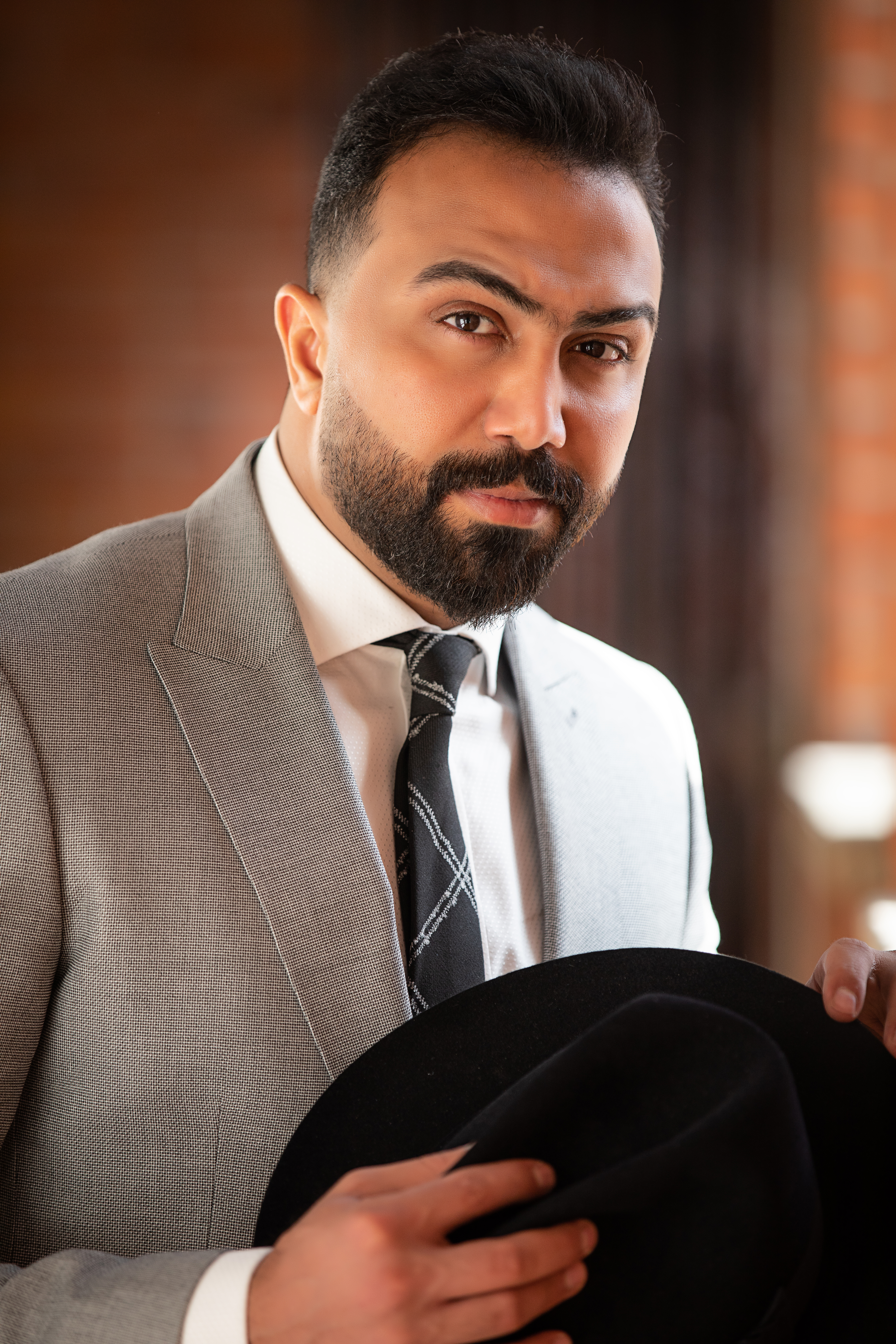
- Mustafa Al-Abdullah in 2020
- Born: Mustafa Abdalkareem Khalaf مصطفى عبدالكريم خلف; 4 October 1989 (age 37); Baghdad, Iraq
- Occupations: Singer; Producer; Music video director
- Musical career
- Origin: Iraq and Lebanon
- Years active: 2010–present

Mustafa Al-Abdullah (Arabic: مصطفى العبد الله; born 4 October 1989) is an Iraqi-Lebanese musician, video director and producer, based in the United Arab Emirates. He rose to prominence in the Arab world with the 2018 hit single "Ta'al".

== Career ==
Mustafa Al-Abdullah was born in Baghdad and studied film direction at the Abu Dhabi Film Institute. He collaborated with artists Haitham Yousif, Rida Al Abdullah and Sattar Saad on The Voice: Ahla Sawt. In 2018, he released the song "Ta'al" featuring Mahmoud Al Turki and Ali Jassim. The music video of the song received over 500 million views on YouTube. His other prominent singles include "Bs Huwa Hubey" featuring Ali Jassim, "Kilish Geta'at Wyay" featuring Mahmoud Al Turki and "Hawa" featuring Ali Jassim. In addition, he also founded the production and distribution company Star Casablanca. In 2020, he released the songs "Ya Kuni" and "Mfrfsh".

== Discography ==
=== As a singer ===
- "Bs Huwa Hubey" (2018)
- "Kilish Geta'at Wyay" (2018)
- "Ta'al" (2018)
- "Hawa" (2018)
- "Al Ahbab" (2018)
- "Bs Huthnak" (2019)
- "Entiras Shieb" (2019)
- "Helu" (2019)
- "Habibi Al Ghali" (2019)
- "Ya Kuni" (2020)
- "Mfrfsh" (2020)

=== As a director ===
Year	Song	Artist
2014	Habeeb El Rouh	Haitham Yousif
2015	Ejana El Liel	Yassir Abd El Wahab ft. Mahmoud
2015	Youma Hmaid	Mahmoud Al Turki
2015	Der Balak Ala Umak	Yassir Abd El Wahab
2015	Um El Esaba	Mahmoud Al Turki
2015	Habebe Hwa	Yasir El Majid
2015	Hayati	Yassir Abd El Wahab
2015	Elman Baad Ahb	Haitham Yousif
2015	Nami Ya Eni	Mahmoud Al Turki
2015	Wafaya	Ali El Ghali
2015	El ma yredni ma reda	Mishtag Sabir
2015	Yreduni	Asaad Hussien ft. Hussien El Basri
2015	Sagarak Ani	Ali El Ghali
2015	Taal el Huthni	Rida Al Abdullah
2016	Ensa El Gharam	Khalid El Haneen
2016	Ma biya heel	Saif Amer
2016	El Furga	Yassir Abd El Wahab
2016	Akhthaw Habebe	Yassir Abd El Wahab
2016	Ta'alw Shufu Hali	Mahmoud Al Turki
2016	Hiss Shwaya	Haitham Yousif
2016	El Galb Galbi	Yassir Abd El Wahab
2016	Thahkuni	Diyaa El Mayali ft. Ali Badir & Ali Ghali
2017	Wala Nassik	Yassir Abd El Wahab ft. Mustafa Falih
2017	El khwa Hna	Evan Naji
2017	Heel Taabit	Evan Naji
2017	Faragtak	Yassir Abd El Wahab ft. Mahmoud Al Turki
2017	Ya Habibi	Mahmoud Al Turki
2017	Ma Shift El youm Habibi	Mahmoud Al Turki
2017	Bil Them	Saif Amer
2017	Bishwesh	Mahmoud Al Turki
2017	Ani Wahid	Tayseer Al Safeer ft. Ali Jassim
2017	Hala Baghdad	Sattar Saad
2017	Za'alan Mn Nafsi	Saif Amer
2018	Abu El Hinya	Ali Jassim
2018	Nieli	Qais Hisham
2018	Aredch	Ali Jassim
2018	Shewaklunak Shakar	Ali Jassim
2018	Ejana El Eid	Salah Hassan
2018	Brouhi	Mahmoud Al Turki ft. Hamza Jalal
2018	Shilo Eiyounkm	Adam Abdalah
2018	Eshig Badawi	Ali Ghali
2018	Hattak Bil Ras	Hakkim
2018	Galbi Saf El them	Saif Amer
2018	Ayefha Yamak	Ali El Ghali
2018	Abous El bakhat	Ali El Ghali
2019	Hilw	Mustafa El Abdalla ft. Ali Jassim
2019	Shw Maku	Ali Jassim ft. Mahmoud Al Turki
2019	Hant El Eshra	Salah Hassan
2019	Bashar Mw Khush	Shahad El Shimare ft. Ali Jassim
2019	Ani Mw Mithlhum	Osama Naji
2019	El Qafla	Ahmed Shakir
2019	Msalma Bid Allah	Ahmed Shakir
2019	Resala	Ali Jassim
