= Fez (hat) =

Cylinder-shaped cap with a flat crown

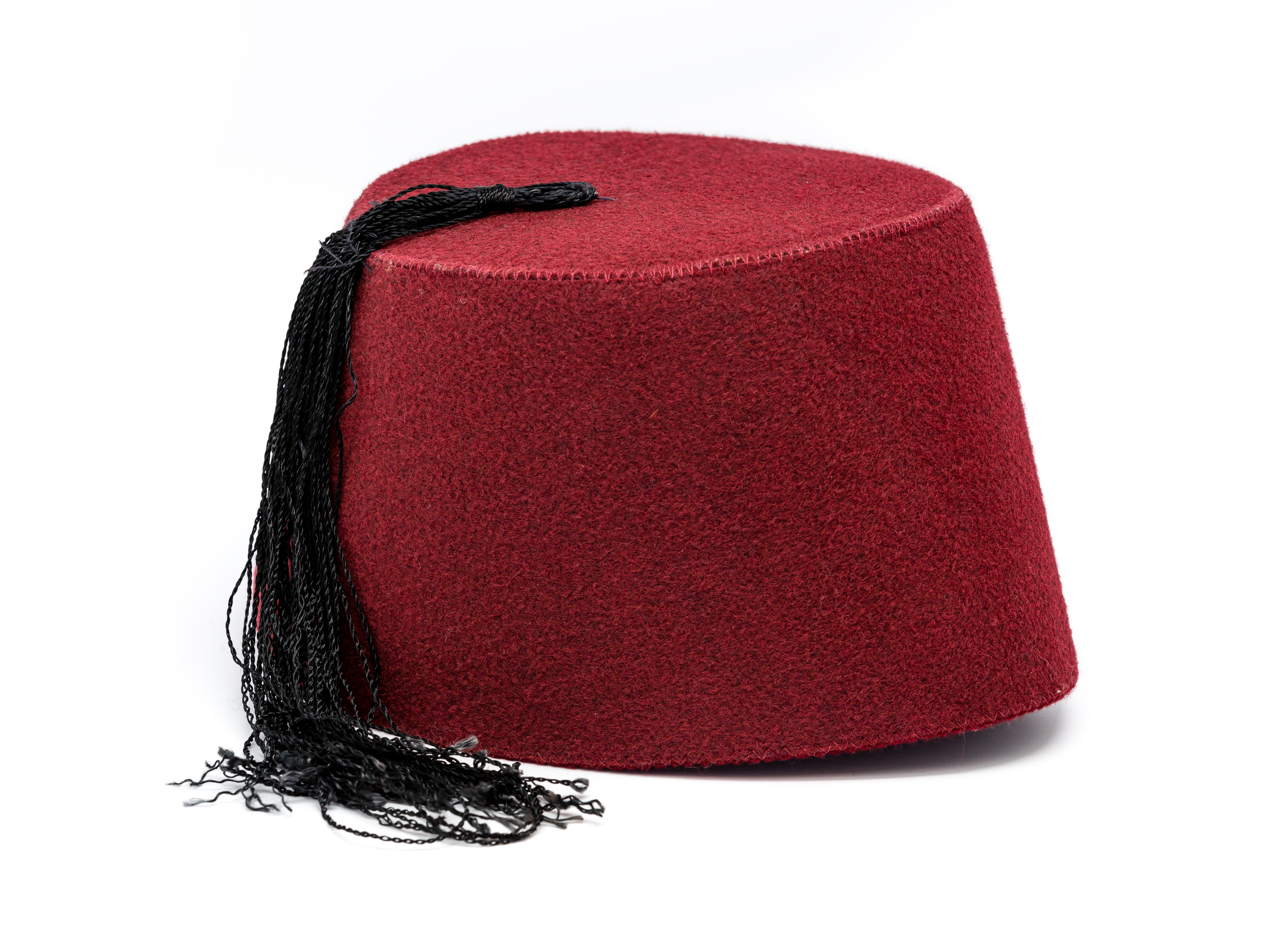
A fez

The fez (Turkish: fes, Ottoman Turkish: فس, romanized: fes), also called tarboosh/tarboush (Arabic: طربوش, romanized: ṭarbūsh), is a felt headdress in the shape of a short, cylindrical, peakless hat, usually red, typically with a black tassel attached to the top. The name "fez" may refer to the Moroccan city of Fez, where the dye to color the hat was extracted from crimson berries. However, its origins are disputed.

The modern fez owes much of its popularity to the Ottoman era. It became a symbol of the Ottoman Empire in the early 19th century. In 1827, Mahmud II mandated its use as a modern headdress for his new army called the Mansure Army. The decision was inspired by the Ottoman naval command, who had previously returned from the Maghreb having embraced the style. In 1829, Mahmud issued new regulations mandating the use of the fez by all civil and religious officials. The intention was to replace the turban, which acted as a marker of identity and so divided rather than unified the population. A century later, in 1925, the fez was outlawed in Turkey as part of Atatürk's reforms. Since then, it has not been a part of Turkish men's clothing.

The fez has been used as part of soldiers' uniforms in many armies and wars for centuries, including the Bahawalpur Regiment in Pakistan as late as the 1960s. It is still worn in parts of South Asia, Southeast Asia, the Middle East, North Africa, and in Cape Town, South Africa. It has also been adopted by various fraternal orders in the English-speaking world.

== Etymology ==
The fez (Turkish: fes, Ottoman Turkish: فس, romanized: fes) is also known as a tarboosh (Arabic: طربوش, romanized: ṭarbūš), also spelt tarboush. The word tarboosh is a variant of شَرْبُوش (šarbūš), borrowed from Persian: Sarpūš, a compound of sar, “head” and puš, “cover” (meaning "headgear"). The dissimilation is speculated to have been motivated by Kipchak تر (tär, “sweat”), as the headpiece is fit to conceal (pôš) perspiration. Some sources suggest that tarboosh is a Turkish word composed of two elements, ter ("sweat") and pošu ("a light turban cloth"). via the Turkish language, from Ottoman Turkish تيرپوس ( , and is used mainly in the countries of the Levant (Syria, Lebanon, Palestine, and Jordan).

The fez takes its name from the Moroccan city of Fez, due to it being the source of the crimson berry once used to dye the felt.

== History ==
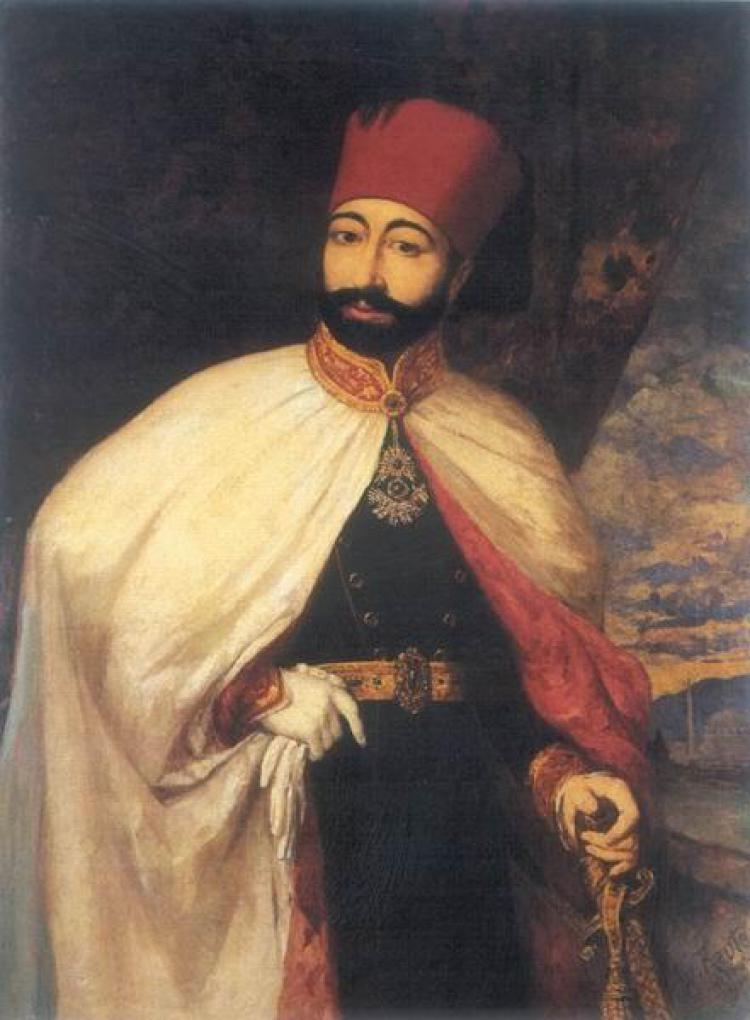
Portrait of the Ottoman Sultan Mahmud II after his clothing reforms

The precise origins of the fez are disputed. Several modern scholarly sources connect the headwear, or its immediate antecedents, with North Africa and the Maghreb. Historian Klaus Kreiser states that the fez owed its "name and origin to the Maghreb", while Faridah Zaman describes it as "thought to originate in North Africa".

More specific accounts differ. Hülya Tezcan states that the fez emerged in Fès, Morocco, a Moroccan origin also given in some older general accounts. Costume historian Charlotte Jirousek, by contrast, traces the soft red caps that preceded the rigid nineteenth-century fez to Tunisia, where the highest-quality examples continued to be produced.

Some older general works instead attributed the fez itself to Turkey.

The fez became especially associated with the Ottoman Empire during the nineteenth century, when its adoption by the Ottoman state helped spread and standardize it widely. Early Ottoman supplies were obtained from Tunisia. An archival study by Ahmet Yiğit records an initial order for 50,000 fezzes from Tunisia for the Asâkir-i Mansûre. The fez subsequently became widely worn throughout the Ottoman world and later across much of the wider Muslim world.

In the Ottoman Empire, the fez began to be used as an official headdress during the reign of Sultan Mahmud II. Over time, the form and manner of wearing the fez changed; these changes were associated with the reigns of different sultans, Westernization policies, and the aesthetic sensibilities of each period. Accordingly, variations can be observed in elements such as the height, rigidity, color, and tassel of the fez across different periods.

Initially, the fez was a brimless red, white, or black bonnet over which a turban was wrapped (similar to a wrapped keffiyeh). Later, the turban was eliminated, the bonnet shortened, and the color fixed to red. Praying while wearing a fez—instead of a headdress with a brim—was easier because Muslims put their heads to the ground during Salah (daily prayers).

The tarboosh was depicted as an element of Turkish clothing as early as around 1460. Mehmed the Conqueror wore a jeweled tarboosh wrapped in a white sarık to signify his right of the conquest of Constantinople. In 1826, Sultan Mahmud II of the Ottoman Empire suppressed the Janissaries and began sweeping reforms of the military. The modernised military adopted Western-style uniforms and, as headdresses, the fez with a cloth wrapped around it. In 1827, 50,000 fezzes were ordered from Tunis for the sultan's troops. In 1829, the Sultan ordered his civil officials to wear the plain fez and banned the wearing of turbans. The intention was to coerce the populace at large to update to the fez, and the plan was successful. This was a radically egalitarian measure, which replaced the elaborate sumptuary laws that signaled rank, religion, and occupation, foreshadowing the Tanzimat reforms. Although tradesmen and artisans generally rejected the fez, it became a symbol of modernity throughout the Near East, inspiring similar decrees in other nations (such as Iran in 1873).

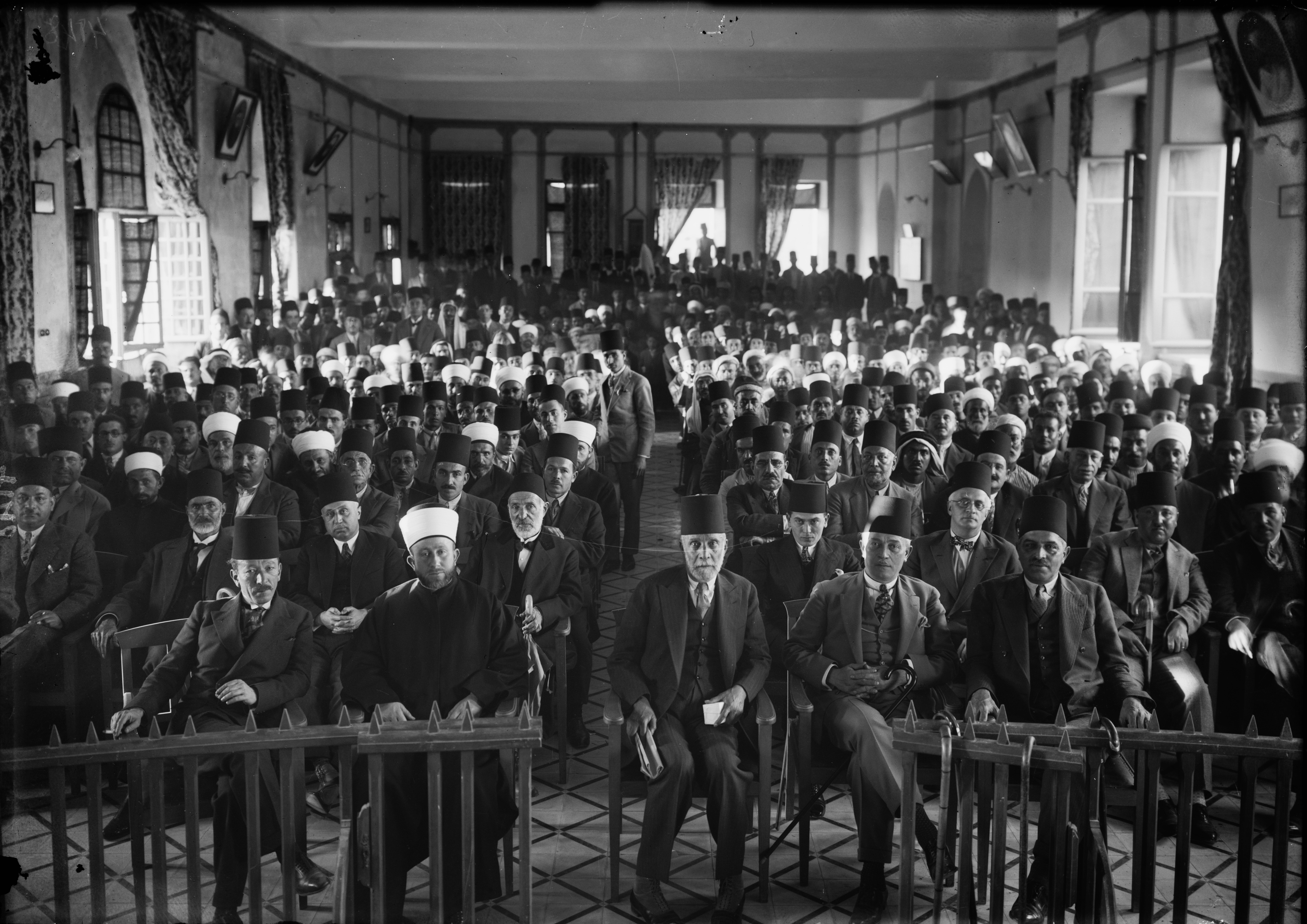
An Arab "protest gathering" against British policy in Palestine, 1929

The original centre of production appears to have been in Tunis. To meet escalating demand, skilled fez makers were induced to immigrate from Tunisia to Constantinople, where factories were established in the neighborhood of Eyüp. Styles soon multiplied, with nuances of shape, height, material, and hue competing in the market. The striking scarlet and merlot colors of the fez were initially achieved through an extract of cornel. However, the invention of low-cost synthetic dyes soon shifted production of the hat to the factories of Strakonice, Czech Republic (then in the Austrian Empire).

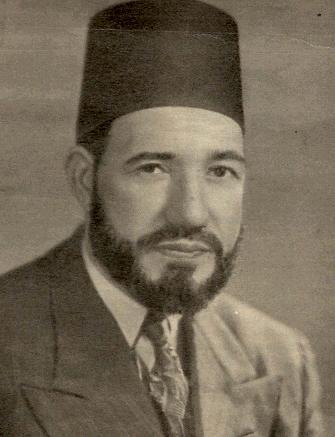
Hassan al-Banna, founder of the Muslim Brotherhood

The 1908 Austro-Hungarian annexation of Bosnia-Herzegovina resulted in a boycott of Austrian goods, which became known as the "Fez Boycott" due to the near-monopoly the Austrians then held on the production of the hat. Although the headdress survived, the year-long boycott brought the end of its universality in the Ottoman Empire as other styles became socially acceptable.

The societal position of the fez as a symbol of tradition led to its ban in Turkey in 1925 by Mustafa Kemal Atatürk in the Hat Revolution, part of his modernizing reforms. It was banned for similar reasons in 1958 in Egypt by Gamal Abdel Nasser government, with Cairo having been one of the most important centers of production of the fez up until then. Fez production has subsequently resumed in Egypt, but its sale is largely aimed at tourists.

=== Symbolism ===
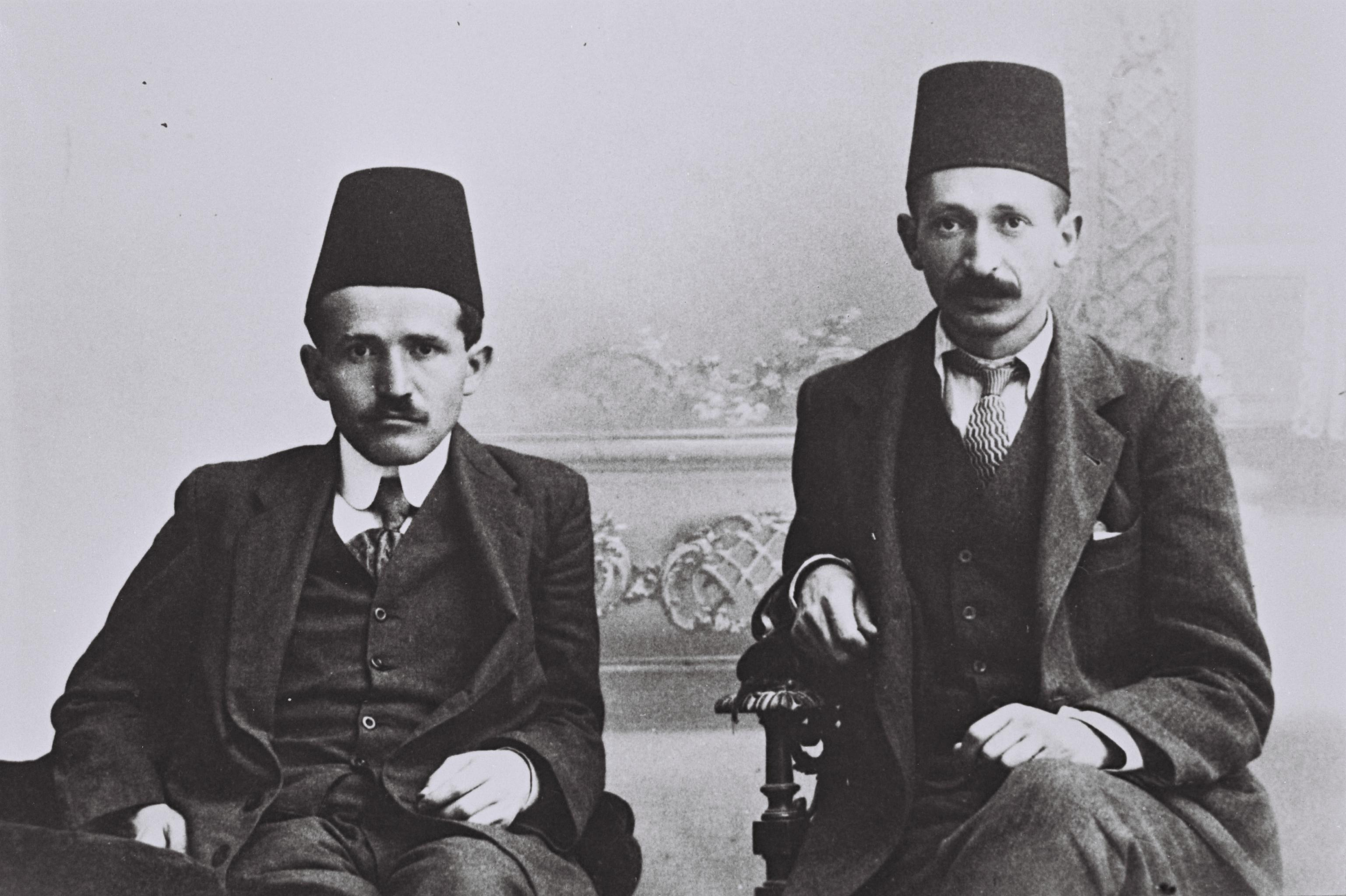
David Ben-Gurion and Yitzhak Ben-Zvi as law students in Constantinople c. 1914

The fez was a symbol not only of Ottoman affiliation but also of religious adherence to Islam. It was also the main headdress for Christians and Jews during the Ottoman Empire. Jewish men wore the fez and referred to it by the Arabic name "Tarboush", especially if they spoke Arabic (Egyptian, Syrian and Jews from the Levant). In southern Asia, the fez had been adopted due to its links with the Ottoman Empire.

Through the 19th and early 20th centuries, the fez was the preferred headwear for Christians and Muslims in the Balkans, which at the time was still mostly under Ottoman suzerainty. There were variations on the fez in the Balkan states, mainly involving the addition of religious symbols on the front. In semi-independent Montenegro, a client state of the Ottoman Empire that enjoyed complete autonomy, its Orthodox citizens wore their fezzes with a Greek cross on the front. Supporters of the Illyrian movement among South Slavs, especially in Croatia, wore their fezzes with a star and crescent on the front irrespective of religion, believing that the symbol predated the introduction of Islam in the Balkans. In 1850, regulations in the newly autonomous Principality of Serbia concerning uniforms of ministerial officers specified the wear of red fezzes displaying the Serbian coat of arms. The fez was a symbol of Arab nationalist resistance against the Zionism during the Arab revolt in Palestine between 1936 and 1939 in the British Mandate.

Over time, the fez came to be seen as part of an Oriental cultural identity. On the one hand this led to its banning as part of modernising reforms in Turkey (1925) and later in Egypt (1958). On the other hand, the western orientalist perception of it during the 20th century west as exotic and romantic led to its vogue as part of men's luxury smoking outfit in the United States and the United Kingdom. It had also become associated with Ottoman domination across much of the former Ottoman Empire and Arab world, though an exception is Morocco, where it became a symbol against French colonisation. Morocco remains one of the last places where the fez is occasionally worn, and remains a favoured part of royal court dress.

== Military use ==
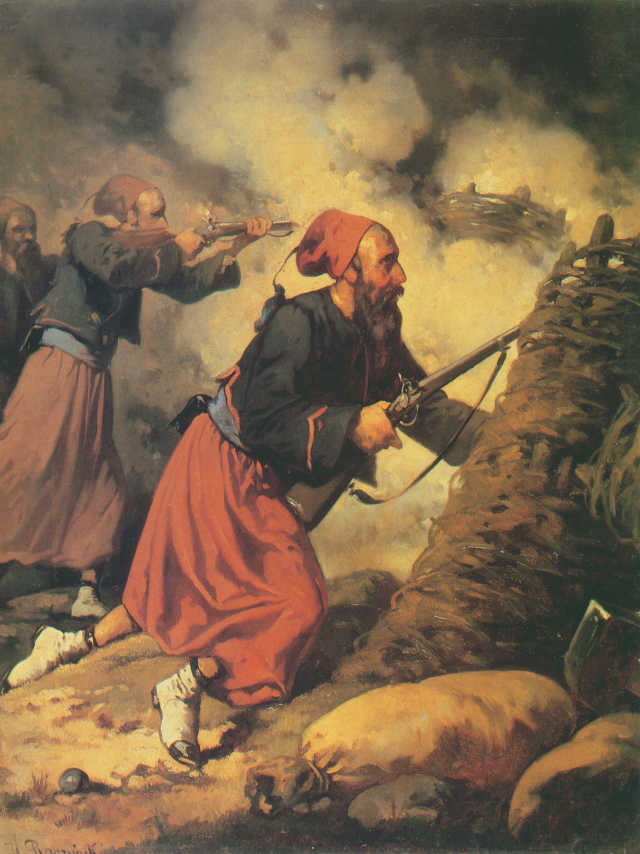
French Zouave during the Crimean War (1853–1856)

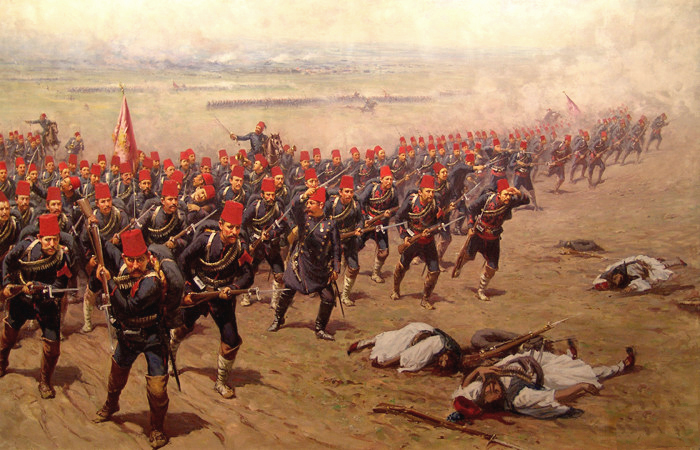
Ottoman soldiers during the Greco-Turkish War (1897)

A version of the fez was used as an arming cap for the 1400–1700s version of the mail armor head protector (a round metal plate or skull-cap, around which hung a curtain of mail to protect the neck and upper shoulder). The red fez with blue tassel was the standard headdress of the Turkish Army from the 1840s until the introduction of a khaki service dress and peakless sun helmet in 1910. The only significant exceptions were cavalry and some artillery units who wore a lambskin hat with colored cloth tops. Albanian levies wore a white version of the fez, resembling their traditional qeleshe. During World War I, the fez was still worn by some naval reserve units and occasionally by soldiers when off duty. The Evzones (light infantry) regiments of the Greek Army wore their own distinctive version of the fez from 1837 until World War II. It now survives in the parade uniform of the Presidential Guard in Athens.

From the mid-19th century on, the fez was widely adopted as the headdress of locally recruited "native" soldiers among the various colonial troops of the world. The French North African regiments (Zouaves, Tirailleurs, and Spahis) wore wide, red fezzes with detachable tassels of various colors. It was an off-duty affectation of the Zouaves to wear their fezzes at different angles according to the regiment; French officers of North African units during the 1930s often wore the same fez as their men, with rank insignia attached. (Many volunteer Zouave regiments wore the French North African version of the fez during the American Civil War.) The Libyan battalions and squadrons of the Italian colonial forces wore lower, red fezzes over white skull caps. Somali and Eritrean regiments in Italian service wore high red fezzes with colored tassels that varied according to the unit. German askaris in East Africa wore their fezzes with khaki covers on nearly all occasions.

The Belgian Force Publique in the Congo wore large and floppy red fezzes similar to those of the French Tirailleurs Senegalais and the Portuguese Companhias Indigenas. The British King's African Rifles (recruited in East Africa) wore high straight-sided fezzes in either red or black, while the West African Frontier Force wore a low red version. The Egyptian Army wore the classic Turkish model until 1950. The West India Regiment of the British Army wore a fez as part of its Zouave-style full dress until this unit was disbanded in 1928. The tradition is continued in the full dress of the band of the Barbados Regiment, with a white turban wrapped around the base.

While the fez was a colorful and picturesque item of uniform, it was in several ways an impractical headdress. If worn without a drab cover, it made the head a target for enemy fire, and it provided little protection from the sun. As a result, it was increasingly relegated to parade or off-duty wear during World War II. However, France's West African tirailleurs continued to wear a khaki-covered version in the field until about 1943. During the final period of colonial rule in Africa (approximately 1945 to 1962), the fez was seen only as a full-dress item in French, British, Belgian, Spanish, and Portuguese African units, being replaced by wide-brimmed hats or forage caps on other occasions. Colonial police forces, however, usually retained the fez as normal duty wear for indigenous personnel.

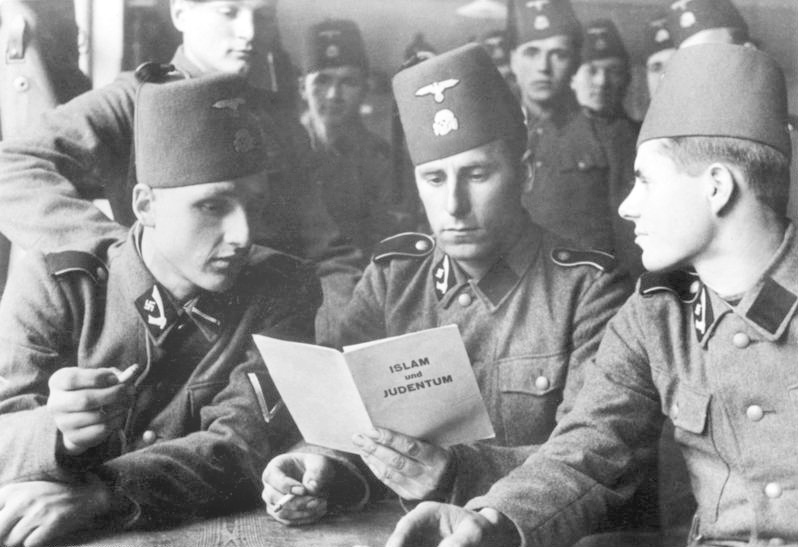
Bosniak Soldiers of the 13th Waffen Mountain Division of the SS Handschar (1943)

Post-independence armies in Africa quickly discarded the fez as a colonial relic. It is, however, still worn by the ceremonial Garde Rouge in Senegal as part of their Spahi-style uniform, and by the Italian Bersaglieri in certain orders of dress. The Bersaglieri adopted the fez as an informal headdress through the influence of the French Zouaves, with whom they served in the Crimean War. The Italian Arditi in the First World War wore a black fez that later became a uniform item of the Mussolini Fascist regime. The Spanish Regulares (formerly Moorish) Tabors stationed in the Spanish exclaves of Ceuta and Melilla, in North Africa, retain a parade uniform that includes the fez and white cloaks. Filipino units organised in the early days of U.S. rule briefly wore black fezzes, and officers serving with Muslim personnel of the Philippines Constabulary were authorised to wear this headdress from 1909. The Liberian Frontier Force, although not a colonial force, wore fezzes until the 1940s.

Bosnian infantry regiments in the Austro-Hungarian Empire had been distinguished by wearing the fez, from the infantry's creation in 1885 until the end of World War I. They wore distinctive light blue or field grey uniforms, with a buckle showing an arm with a scimitar inside a shield as the symbol of Bosniak ethnicity. The primarily Bosniak Muslim 13th Waffen Mountain Division of the SS Handschar, which was recruited from Bosnia, used a red or field grey fez with Waffen SS cap insignia during the latter half of World War II. Their fezzes were decorated on the front with Hoheitszeichen (eagle and Swastika) and the SS Totenkopf (skull and crossbones).

Two regiments of the Indian Army recruited from Muslim areas wore fezzes under British rule (although the turban was the nearly-universal headdress among Hindu and Muslim sepoys and sowars). A green fez was worn by the Bahawalpur Lancers of Pakistan as late as the 1960s.

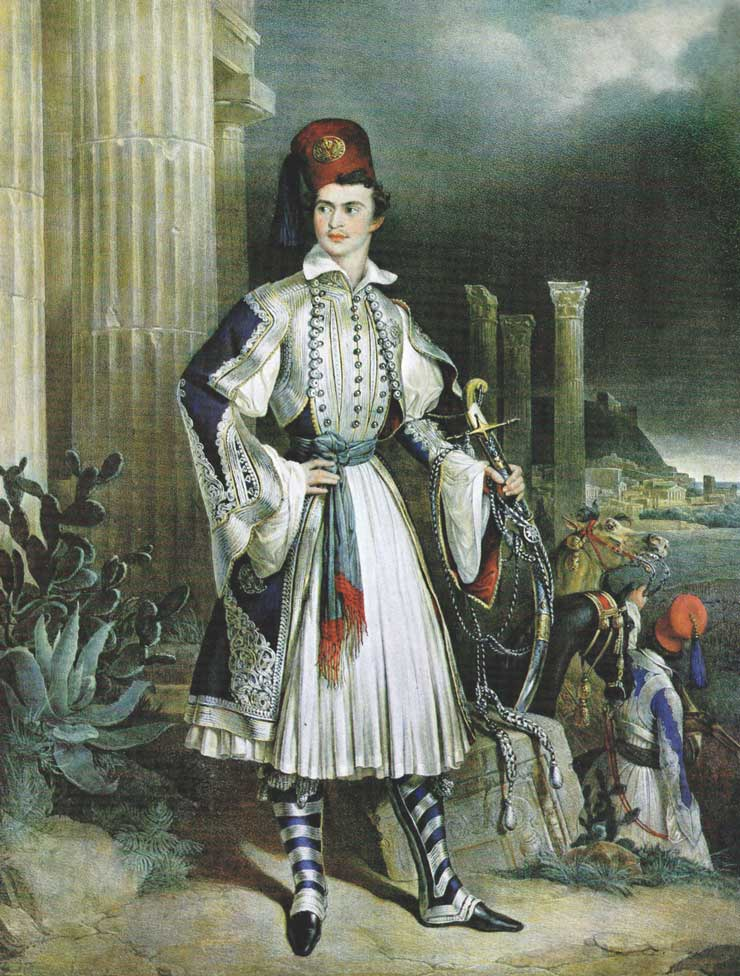
Otto of Greece in an Evzones uniform

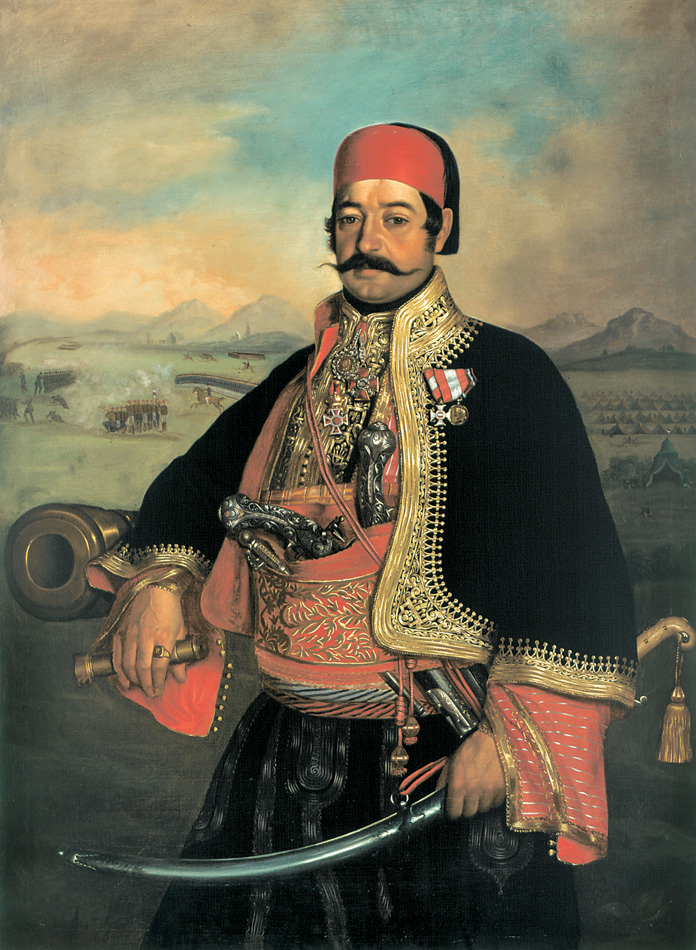
Serbian voivode Stevan Knićanin, 1849

== Modern use ==
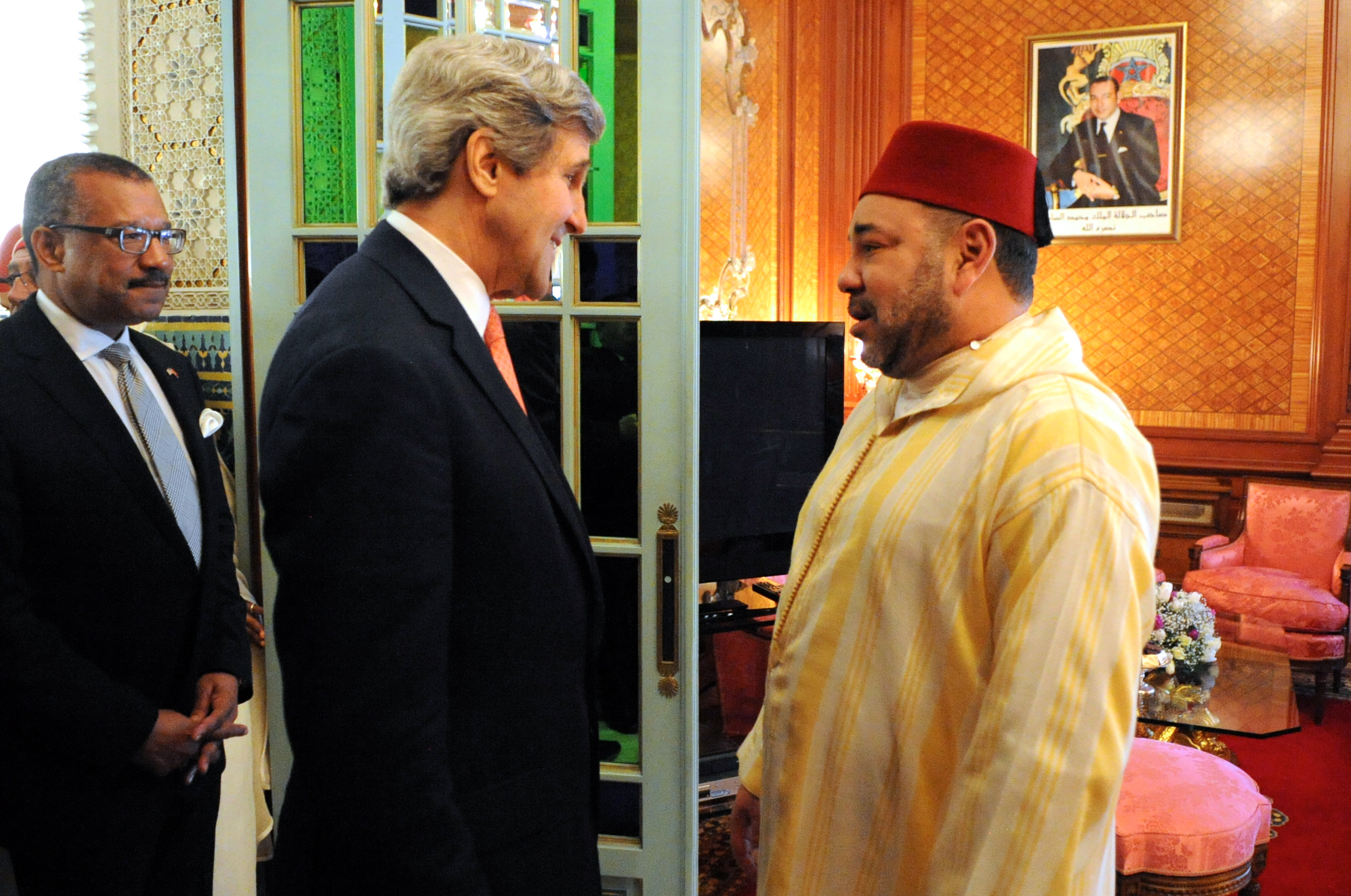
King Mohammed VI of Morocco meets John Kerry and Dwight Bush while wearing a fez

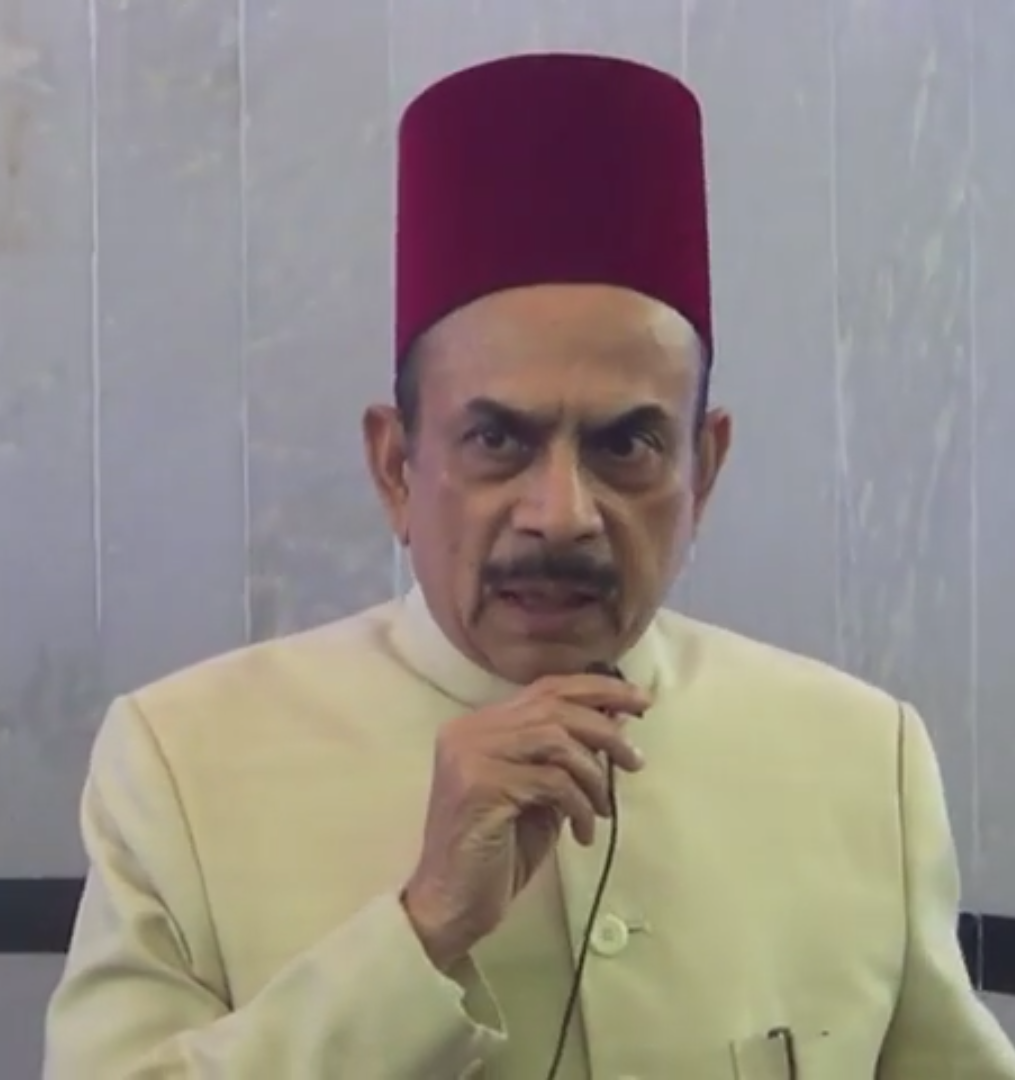
Mahmood Ali, Indian politician and Deputy Chief Minister of Telangana state wearing a fez

=== In Arab countries ===
In Arab countries, tarboush-making is a profession passed down from parents to children through generations. Producing the hat is tricky and requires a high degree of precision, with many stages in its production cycle. Fewer and fewer people have inherited and continue the profession. In Iraq, the Iraqi Sidara replaced the Fez after the country's independence from the Ottoman Empire.

In the Levant, the tarboush is still worn, but it is becoming rarer in recent times, and mostly worn by minstrels, or people who work in the tourist industry in historical places. It is still regarded as traditional Syrian headwear.

However, in Morocco, the tarboush is still worn as part of everyday attire. This is also the case amongst Samaritans, for whom the tarboush is an ethnoreligiously intangible article of clothing.

=== In South Asia ===
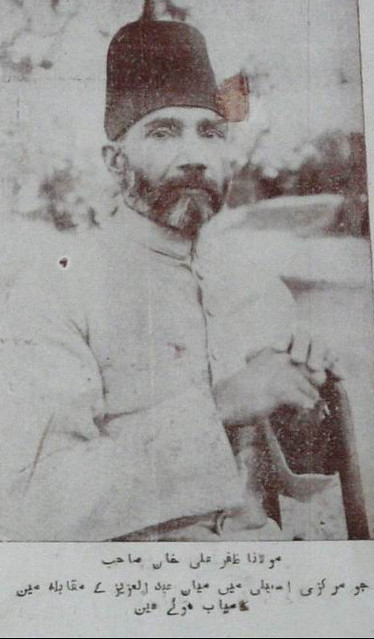
Zafar Ali Khan, a Pakistani writer, poet, translator, and journalist who played an important role in the Pakistan Movement against British rule, used to wear a fez.

In Hyderabad, the fez is known as the Rumi Topi, which means "Roman Cap" (by virtue of the Ottoman Empire being seen as the successor state of the Eastern Roman Empire). The fez was popularised by Nizam Mir Osman Ali Khan of princely Hyderabad after he visited Rome. As per Himayat Ali Mirza, the great-grandson of the Nizam, Mir Osman Ali Khan never wore expensive clothes but used to wear Rumi Topi to camouflage his short physical stature — he was only five feet tall — and advised his son Moazzam Jah to also wear the Rumi Topi.

The fez was also a symbol of support for the Ottoman Caliphate against the British Indian Empire during the Khilafat Movement. Later, it became associated with some leaders of the Muslim League, the political party that eventually created the country of Pakistan. The veteran Pakistani politician Nawabzada Nasrullah Khan was one of the few people in Pakistan who wore the fez until he died in 2003.

In Sri Lanka, the fez was frequently worn by the local Muslim Sri Lankan Moor population. Despite its decline in popularity, the fez is still used in traditional marriage ceremonies. It continues to be worn by "Qadiriyathun Nabaviyyah" Sufi path followers. The songkok, a variation of the fez, is worn by the local Sri Lankan Malays.

=== In Southeast Asia ===
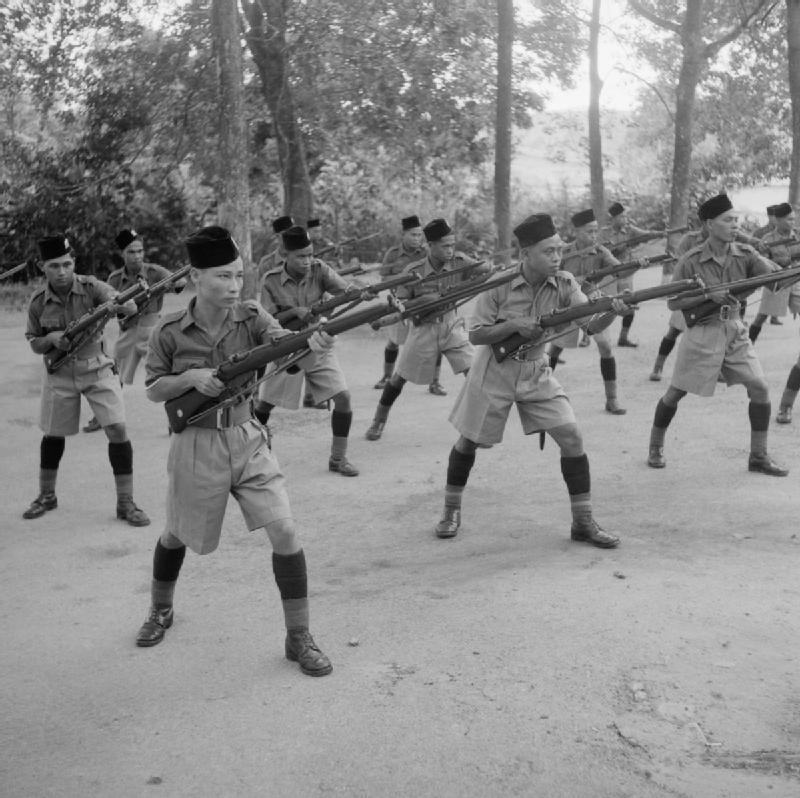
Malay Soldiers of the Royal Malay Regiment wearing songkok at bayonet practice (1941)

The name "songkok" is also used in Sumatra and the Malay Peninsula, while in Java, it is called "kopiah"; this headwear is also known widely in Indonesia as "peci", although peci is somewhat different. This hat has been commonly worn in Maritime Southeast Asia since the 19th century, when it was introduced by Muslims from South Asia.

=== In South Africa ===
The Turkish-style fez was introduced to Cape Malays in Cape Town, South Africa, by Sheikh Abu Bakr Effendi, when he moved there from Turkey in 1863 to teach them about their religion. Before this, the Dutch East India Company had compelled Muslims in the Cape of Good Hope, mainly brought as slaves from what is now Indonesia, to hide their religious practice, with death as the punishment for practising their faith in public or for attempting to convert anyone.

Muslim men have continued to wear the fez there, where it is also referred to as a kofia (also spelt kofija). especially at prayer times in mosques, at weddings, and at home as a sign of respect when in the company of elderly people. It is also popular with children at madrassas (Islamic schools). However, the last traditional fez-maker in Cape Town retired in March 2022.

The "Silver Fez" is a competition of all-male choirs from the Cape Malay community in Cape Town, involving thousands of musicians and a wide variety of tunes. A documentary film, The Silver Fez, was made about the competition and released in 2009.

=== Use by fraternal orders ===
Los Angeles' Shriners Arab Patrol in costume in the midst dance with people looking on, circa 1925

Many fraternal orders are known for wearing fezzes.

- Shriners are often depicted wearing a red fez. The headgear became official for the Shriners in 1872. Similarly, the Ancient Egyptian Arabic Order of the Nobles of the Mystic Shrine also wore fezzes.
- Members of the International Order of Alhambra wear a white fez.
- Members of the Mystic Order of Veiled Prophets of the Enchanted Realm wear a black fez.
- The Knights of Peter Claver wear a blue fez.
- Members of the Ancient Mystic Order of Samaritans wear fezzes of various colors, based upon rank.
- The Knights of Khorassan wear a navy blue fez.
- Members of the Improved Benevolent and Protective Order of Elks of the World wear fezzes of various colors, based upon rank.
- The Loyal Order of Moose's second-degree body, the Moose Legion, wears a purple fez.
- The Sons of the Desert is an international fraternal organization devoted to the lives and films of comedians Stan Laurel and Oliver Hardy. The group takes its name from a fictional lodge that Laurel and Hardy belonged to in the 1933 film Sons of the Desert. A special fez is worn occasionally by some members.
- Senior members of the Fraternal Order of Moai wear a navy blue fez.

== In popular culture ==
British comedian Tommy Cooper adopted the fez as part of his comic act while serving in Egypt during the Second World War. The hat went on to become Cooper's hallmark and an icon of 20th-century comedy.

Fans of English rugby team Saracens often wear fezzes to matches, and the club itself describes the fez as "one of the most recognisable club symbols".

The pop group Madness have often worn fezzes, as seen in the music video to their 1979 song "Night Boat to Cairo".

In the Disney animated series Gravity Falls, Grunkle Stan, a main character who has a persona "Mr. Mystery", wears a fez which sometimes features a Shriners symbol.

The Eleventh Doctor (portrayed by Matt Smith) has a fascination with the fez, and wears it in some episodes of the British sci-fi television series Doctor Who. A fez also features in one Thirteenth Doctor episode, it's also worn by the Tenth Doctor briefly in the episode “Day of the Doctor”.

Many active clergy members of the Church of the SubGenius wear red fezzes.

== See also ==
- Kalpak, a similar Turkic head cap
- Kopiah
- Kufi, brimless, rounded cap
- List of hat styles
- List of headgear
- Moorish Science Temple of America, where male members wore fezzes
- Qeleshe, a white, rounded cap worn by Albanians
- Sidara, an Iraqi cap that can be folded
- Songkok, a truncated conical felt hat in Southeast Asia
- Taqiyah, a brimless, rounded cap
