= Jazz in Iraq =

Jazz in Iraq is a relatively recent musical phenomenon that has experienced growth and increased visibility since the early 21st century. While still not as popular as other genres in the country, the blend of traditional Iraqi music and American jazz has had a significant impact on Iraq's cultural landscape and international perception.

== History ==
Jazz first arrived in Iraq during the mid-20th century, mainly through British and American radio broadcasts, and later vinyl records. However, it was not until the early 21st century that the genre began to gain traction, spurred by increased access to international music via the internet.

The 2003 invasion of Iraq by a U.S.-led coalition was a turning point for jazz in the country. The ensuing years saw an influx of different musical influences from around the world. While these changes were met with resistance by some, others embraced them, leading to the rise of various Western musical genres, including jazz.

== See also ==
- Music of Iraq
- Underground music in Iraq
- Jazz
