= Music of Iraq =

The music of Iraq (Arabic: موسيقى عراقية mūsīqā ʿirāqiyya) spans numerous genres across many different cultures and ethnic groups, including Mesopotamian Arabic, Assyrian, Kurdish, and Turkmen, among others. Apart from the traditional music of these peoples, Iraqi music includes contemporary music styles like pop, rock, soul and urban contemporary. Prominent instruments used in the production of many Iraqi musical works include the oud, Iraqi santur, and riq.

== History ==
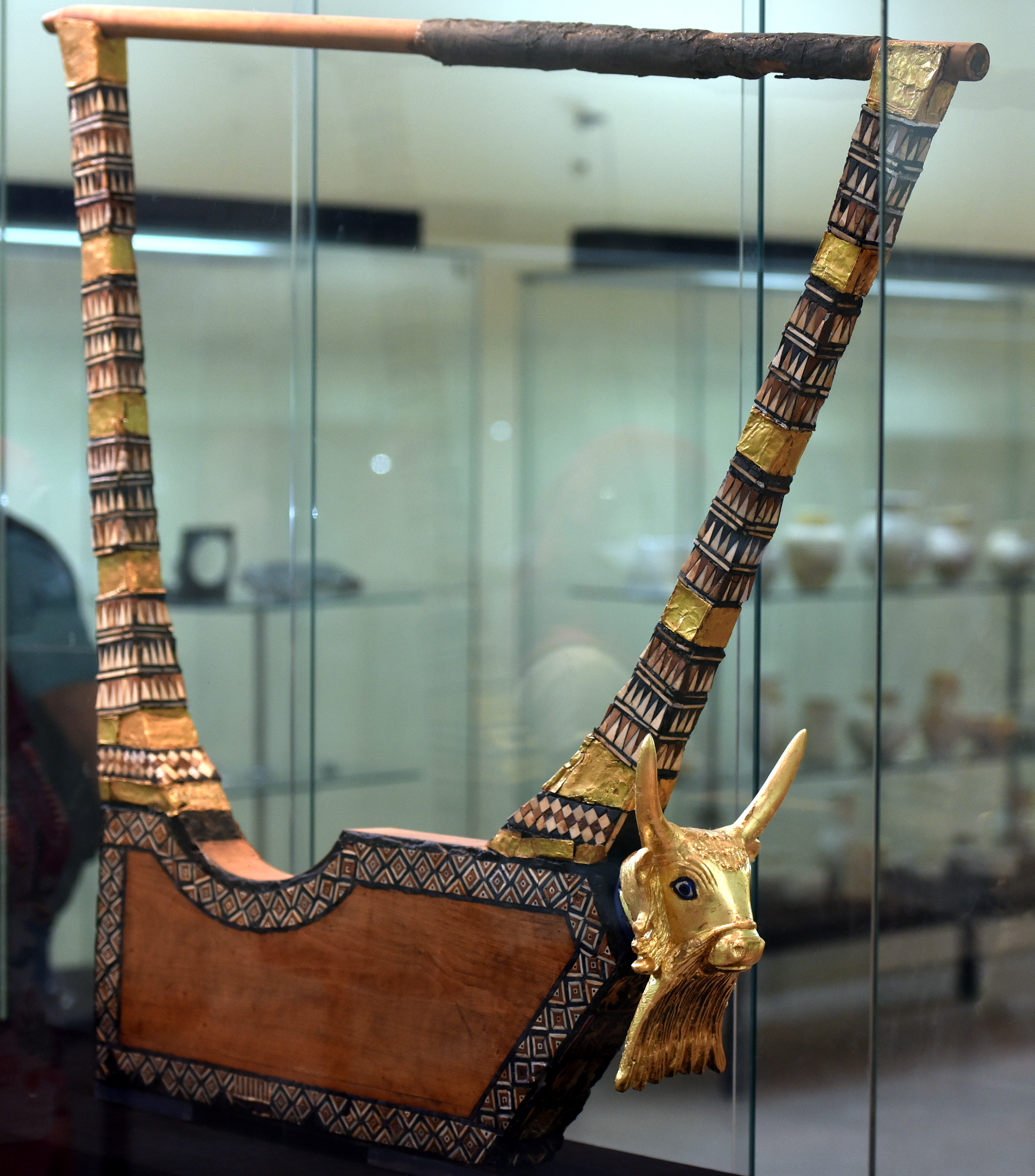
The Queen's gold lyre from the Royal Cemetery at Ur. Iraq Museum, Baghdad

=== Instruments ===
In 1929, scientists led by the British archaeologist Leonard Woolley, representing a joint expedition of the British Museum and the University of Pennsylvania Museum of Archaeology and Anthropology, discovered the Lyres of Ur or Harps of Ur, when excavating the Royal Cemetery of Ur between from 1922 and 1934. These are considered to be the world's second oldest surviving stringed instruments The archaeologists discovered pieces of three lyres and one harp in Ur, located in what was Ancient Mesopotamia, in modern day Iraq. They are over 4,500 years old, and have been dated from ancient Mesopotamia during the Early Dynastic III Period (2550–2450 BC). The decorations on the lyres are fine examples of the court art of Mesopotamia of the period.

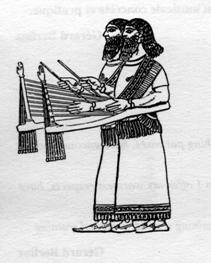
- The archetype of the santur instrument carried horizontally and struck with two sticks, found in iconographical documents in ancient Babylon (1600-911 BCE) and Neo-Assyria (911-612 BCE).

String instrument
- Classification: Struck

Related instruments
- Qanun

== Classical Iraqi music ==
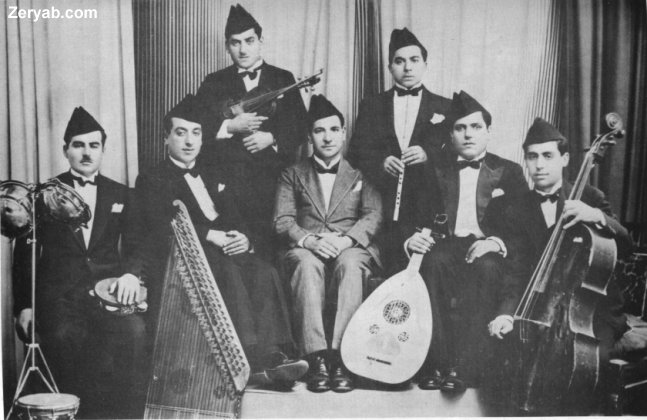
Iraqi music group led by Yusuf Za'arur in Baghdad, wearing the sidara, ca 1930.

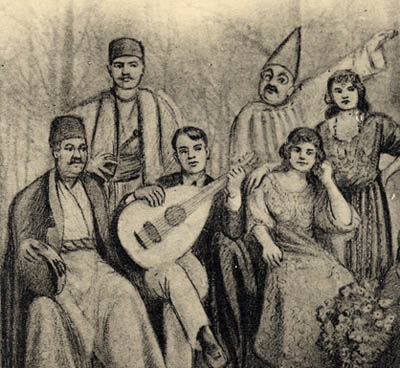
Musical theater group in Baghdad, 1920s.

Iraqi classical music necessitates some discussion of the social environment, as well as references to the poetry. Poetry is always rendered clearly. Poetry is the art of the Iraqis, and sung poetry is the finest of all. In Baghdad from 760 to 1260, writers spurned musical notation.

=== Maqam ===
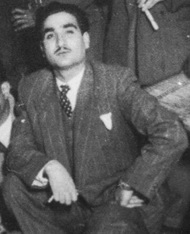
Nazem al-Ghazali was one of the most popular singers in the history of Iraq and in the Arab world. His songs are still heard by many in the Arab world. He was known by his maqam songs.

Across the Arab world, maqam refers to a musical genre of specific melodic modes and Arabic poetry. When a musician performs maqam, the performer improvises parts of the song, but based on rules. There are between fifty and seventy maqams, each with its own mood and characteristics, many of which have sub-styles. Instruments include qanun, riq, santur, darbuka, naqareh, ney, joze and oud. Baghdad's Chalgi ensembles typically include the joze and ney, and may also utilize an oud.

"Lil 'Ashiqi fi-l Hawa Dala'il" by Ahmed Abdul Qadir al-Musili (1877-1941).

Maqama texts are often derived from classical Arabic poetry, such as by Muhammad Mahdi al-Jawahiri, al-Mutanabbi and Abu Nuwas, or Persian poets like Hafez and Omar Khayyám. Some performers used traditional sources translated into the dialect of Baghdad, and still others use Arabic, Turkish, Armenian, Hebrew, Turkmen, Aramaic or Persian language lyrics.

==== History ====
The roots of modern Iraqi maqam can be traced as far back as the Abbasid Caliphate, when that large empire was controlled from Baghdad.

The pasta پﺴﺘﺔ (pl. pastat پﺴﺘﺍﺖ) is "a short song, usually in colloquial Arabic, performed at the end of an Iraqi maqam." It has been popularized in the 20th century, growing more prominent with the rise of recorded music and radio broadcasts. Among the most popular pasta performers have been the husband and wife Nazem al-Ghazali and Salima Murad.

Popular maqam singers are Rachid Al-Qundarchi (1887–1945), Muhammad al-Qubanchi (1904-1989), Youssouf Omar (1918–1987), Salim Shibbeth (born 1908), Hassan Chewke (1912–1962), Najim Al-Sheikhli (1893–1938), Hamid Al Saadi (1959-), and Farida Mohammad Ali (1963-), who moved to the Netherlands in 1997.

== Modern era ==
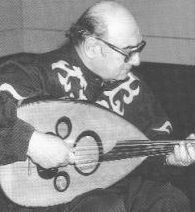
Munir Bashir, an Iraqi musician.

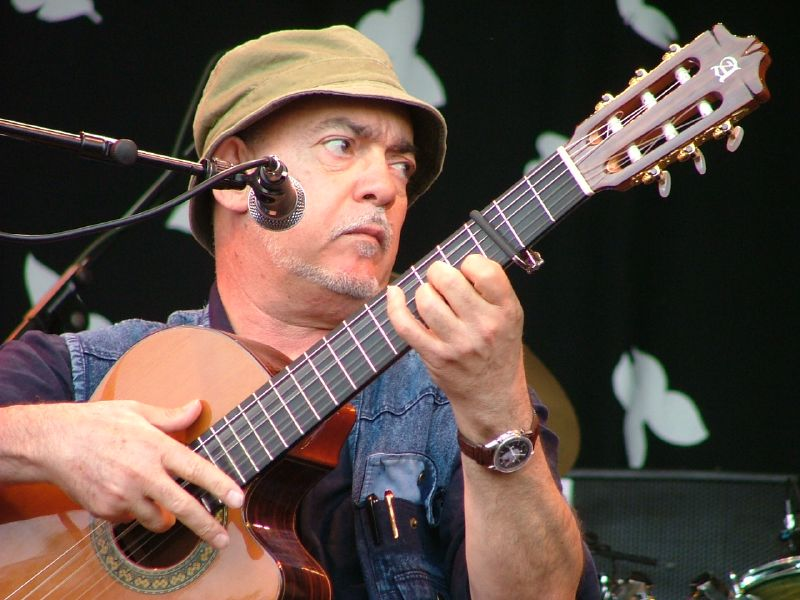
Ilham Madfai, "The Baghdad Beatle". Madfai's synthesis of Western guitar stylings with traditional Iraqi music has made him a popular performer in his native country and throughout the Middle East.

In 1936, Iraq Radio was established by two of Iraq's prominent performers and composers, the Kuwaiti-born Iraqi Jewish musicians, Saleh and Daoud al-Kuwaity with a nearly all Jewish ensemble, except for the percussion player. The nightclubs of Baghdad also featured almost entirely Jewish musicians. At these nightclubs, ensembles consisted of oud, qanun and two percussionists, while the same format with ney and cello was used on the radio.

One of the reasons for the predominance of Jewish instrumentalists in early 20th century Iraqi music was a prominent school for blind Jewish children, which was founded in the late 1920s by the qanun player Yusuf Za'arur.

The most famous singer of the 1930s–1940s was the Jewish singer Salima Murad. The respect and adoration for her were unusual at the time, since public performance by women was considered shameful and most female singers were recruited from brothels.

Numerous instrumentalists and singers of the middle and late twentieth century were trained at the Baghdad Conservatory, such as oud players Munir Bashir, his brother Jamil Bashir (who both taught there), Salman Shukur, Ghanim Haddad, and Rahim AlHaj, who studied under Munir and Jamil Bashir, as well as composer and oud player Salim Abdul Kareem.

In the 20th century, the Iraqi school of oud players became internationally known, with players such as Salman Shukur, Munir Bashir and Naseer Shamma developing a refined style of playing combining older Arabic elements with more recent Anatolian influences.

== Pop music ==
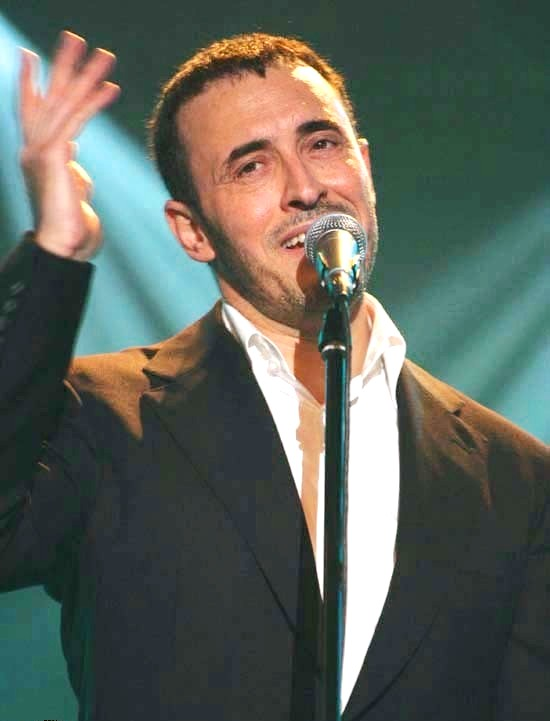
Kadim Al Sahir known as "The Caesar" of Arabic songs. Considered as one of the most successful singers in the history of the Arab World.

Until the fall of Saddam Hussein, the most popular radio station was the Voice of Youth, which used to play the popular music of Iraq to continue the culture of the country. The station also played a mix of rock, hip hop and pop music.

== Effect of 2003 Iraq War ==
After the 2003 invasion of Iraq and fall of Saddam Hussein, and with some religious figures coming to power, concerts were forbidden in areas considered as "conservative". However, since 2018, many concerts were held in different areas throughout the country. In 2021, the Babylon arts festival was held for the first time in almost 20 years. Performers were from Iraq, the Middle East, Europe and Africa.

== Film ==
The 2015 documentary film On the Banks of the Tigris, by filmmaker Marsha Emerman and Iraqi-Australian writer and actor Majid Shokor, shows some of the historical and contemporary Iraqi musicians and traditions. It features Iraqi Jewish musicians who moved from Baghdad, where they were celebrities, to Israel, where they were anonymous. Shokor left Iraq as a refuguee from Saddam Hussein's regime, as did many musicians. The film was awarded Best Documentary Film at the Baghdad International Film Festival that year.

== Important musicians ==
- List of Iraqi musicians

== See also ==
- Jazz in Iraq
- Music and Ballet School of Baghdad
- Underground music in Iraq
