= Iraqi maqam =

Iraqi genre of Arabic maqam

Iraqi Maqam
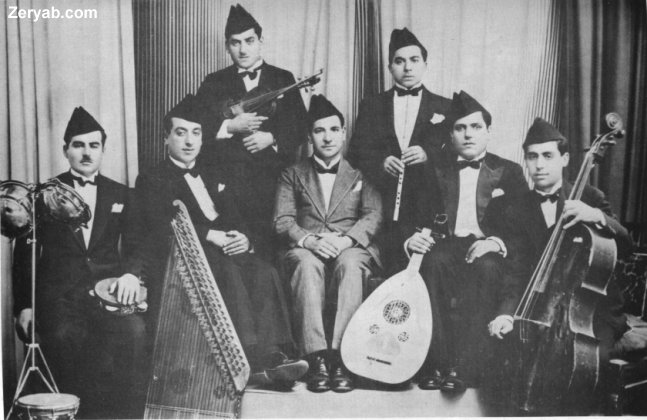
- Iraqi maqam performers led by Yusuf Za'arur
- Native name: المقام العراقي
- Stylistic origins: Arabic maqam
- Cultural origins: ca. 7th–9th century
- Typical instruments: Santur, joza, ney, oud and naqqarat

Iraqi Maqam
- UNESCO Intangible Cultural Heritage
- Country: Iraq
- Reference: 00076
- Region: Asia and the Pacific

Inscription history
- Inscription: 2008 (3rd session)
- List: Representative

Iraqi Maqam (Arabic: المقام العراقي, romanized: al-maqām al-ʿIrāqī) is a genre of Arabic maqam music historically created in Iraq.

== History ==
The roots of Iraqi maqam can be traced as far back as the Abbasid Caliphate (8th–13th centuries CE), when that large empire was controlled from Baghdad. Over time, musicians have performed a large number of traditional and more modern Iraqi makams. The Iraqi makam is related to similar traditional musical genres of Iran, Azerbaijan and Uzbekistan.

The musical ensemble for this genre, called Al Chalghi al Baghdadi, includes a qari' (singer), santur or qanun, daf, joza, and sometimes oud and naqqarat. An important part of the musical improvisation are the poetic lyrics sung in classical Arabic or an Iraqi dialect (then called zuhayri). A maqam concert may last for hours and its parts are known as fasl (plural fusul). They are named after the first musical mode: Bayat, Hijaz, Rast, Nawa, or Husayni. At the end of such a makam performance, a short song called Pasta پﺴﺘﺔ (pl. pastat پﺴﺘﺍﺖ) may be added.

A typical performance includes the following sections:

- tahrir, sometimes badwah
- taslum
- finalis

Maqam lyrics are often derived from classical Arabic poetry, such as by al-Mutanabbi and Abu Nuwas. Some performers have used traditional sources translated into the dialect of Baghdad, and still others use Arabic, Persian, Turkish, Armenian, Hebrew, Turkmen, or Aramaic lyrics. Due to Iraq's diversity, different ethnic groups perform this genre in their own language.

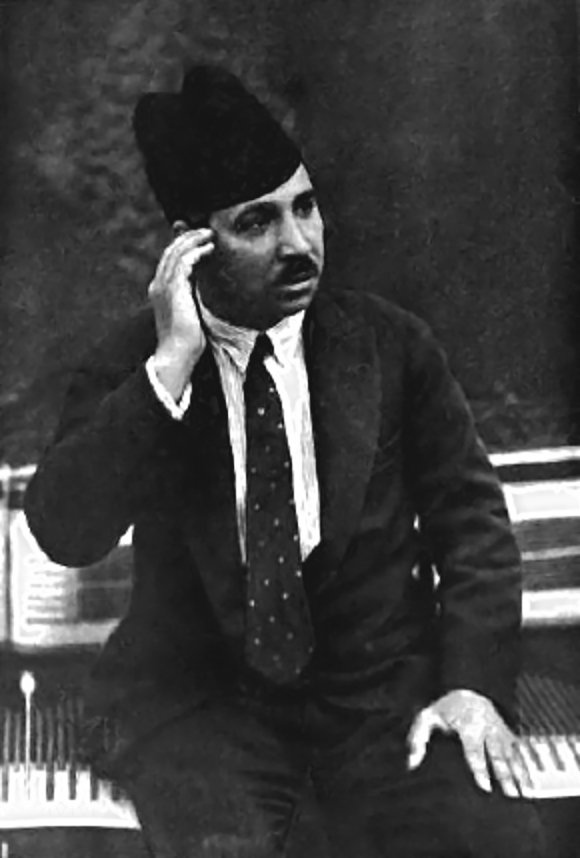
Muhammad al-Qubanchi, c. 1932

At the Cairo Congress of Arab Music in 1932, Muhammad al-Qubanchi and his Baghdad ensemble performed several compositions of Iraqi maqams. He was chosen as the leader of the delegation from Iraq to present this genuine Iraqi genre that was not known outside of his country up to that time. The performances of the Cairo Congress were originally recorded on 78 rpm records and played on the Iraqi radio in the 1950s. Along with other live performances from the congress, al-Qubanchi's versions of Iraqi maqams were reissued in 2014 by the National Library of France.

== Recognition ==
In 2008, the Iraqi maqam was added to the UNESCO List of the Intangible Cultural Heritage of Humanity. In their description of this "highly revered" genre in Iraq and abroad, UNESCO wrote:

While many Arab musical styles in the region have either disappeared or become westernized, the Iraqi Maqam has remained largely intact, in particular retaining its ornate vocal technique and improvisational character.

== Notable maqam singers ==
Prominent Iraqi maqam singers include:

- Ahmed al-Zaidan
- Rashid al-Qundarchi
- Muhammad al-Qubanchi
- Hussein al-A'dhami
- Najm al-Shaykhli
- Hassan Khaiwka
- Hashim al-Rejab
- Yousuf Omar
- Farida Mohammad Ali
- Abd al-Rahman Khader
- Hamed al-Sa‘di
- Salima Murad
- Nazem Al-Ghazali
- Filfel Gourgy
- Affifa Iskandar
- Mulla Hasan al-Babujachi
- Rahmat Allah Shiltagh
- Khalil Rabbaz
- Rahmain Niftar
- Rubin Rajwan
- Mulla Uthman al-Mawsili
- Jamil al-Baghdadi
- Salman Moshe
- Yusuf Huresh
- Abbas Kambir
- Farida al-A‘dhami
- Maeda Nazhat

== See also ==
- Music of Iraq
