= Sidara =

Traditional Iraqi headwear

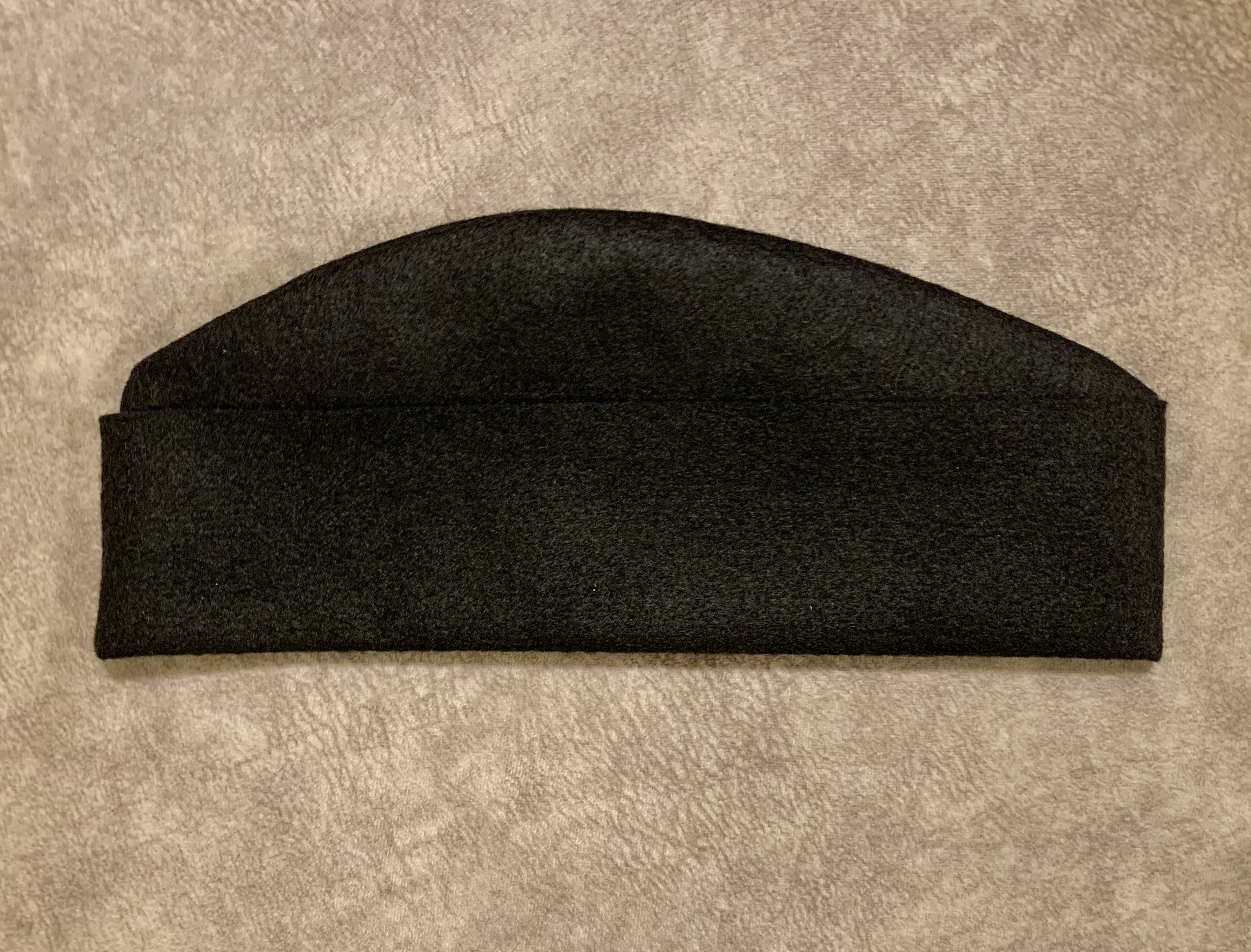
A folded Sidara.

Al-Sidara (Arabic: السدارة), also known as the Iraqi Sidara (Arabic: السدارة العراقية) or al-Faisaliyya (Arabic: الفيصلية), is a cap that can be folded flat when not being worn. The hat was introduced by King Faisal I of Iraq shortly after gaining independence from the United Kingdom, with the intention to create a national dress for the head and to distinguish the people of Iraq from neighboring countries, most notably the Ottomans, who wore the Fez, and Arabs of the Arabian Peninsula, who wore the ghutra and aqal. While the headwear's usage declined after the fall of the monarchy, the cap is still worn during special occasions and weddings.

Recently, the phenomenon of wearing the Sidara has been revived in Baghdad and other major cities within the country.

== Historical background ==
While the cap has been associated with various military forces since the middle of the 19th century, the Iraqi Sidara was associated with both military and civilians in Iraq. This began On August 23, 1921, when Faisal I assumed the throne of Mandatory Iraq. King Faisal I dreamed of building a modern state in Iraq, and introducing a number of traditions and modern political and social systems to the country, a country that had just emerged from the Ottoman rule, which lasted nearly four centuries. Among these changes, the king wanted to find a national dress for the head and to distinguish the people of Iraq from neighboring countries, most notably the Ottomans, who wore the Fez, and Arabs of the Arabian Peninsula, who wore the thawb. It was distributed for the first time to ministers by Rustam Haidar, one of the king's advisors at the time. The sidara was first worn by King Faisal I to encourage people to wear it, and thus it is also known as a Faisaliyya. The sidara was mainly used in big cities, like Baghdad and Mosul.

It was also reported that King Faisal I paid close attention to the spreading of the Sidara as a national headwear. According to Iraqi architect Hisham Munir, King Faisal I has once surprised his father with a visit; carrying a small bag of paper underneath his arm. Faisal I gifted the Sidara (which was in the bag) to his father and said "I came to you as a visitor, Abu Shawkat, to offer you a gift that I hope you will accept from me!" His father immediately accepted the gift and adopted the hat despite preferring the Ottoman fez.

During the 1936 Iraqi coup d'état, there were attempts to abolish the national Sidara to replace it with a European hat in an attempt to globalize Iraq. This was done in a law that was issued by the coup government in which they banned the wearing of the headwear. This policy was inspired by Atatürk's reforms in which he banned the wearing of the Ottoman fez. However, these attempts by the coup government didn't go anywhere. The Iraqi Sidara also represented Effendis, intellectuals, and the civil class in Baghdad. As such, the Sidara is famous for being a Baghdadi headwear too.

== Sidara today ==
Since the fall of the monarchy in Iraq, the popularity of the Sidara has gradually declined. The last major figure to wear it was former presidents Ahmed Hassan al-Bakr and Saddam Hussein. Since the 1980s, it has become uncommon to see a person wearing the Sidara in Iraq, except in some particular places in both Baghdad and Mosul, and on occasions that bear a traditional character. The Iraqi Sidara has disappeared from the Iraqi military uniform in the 21st century. The Iraqi Sidara has recently been revived in cultural and artistic circles. Due to the current conditions in Iraq, the headwear represents a form of nostalgia for the past, especially a political one where the Iraqi state existed with proper laws, institutions, and sovereignty. Due to its return as a cultural symbol, the headgear became associated with the educated class too since national dresses are usually linked to a society's heritage and traditions by Iraqi academics.

In Erbil, there's an annual exhibition that celebrates the Iraqi Sidara and its many variants and forms as an expression of adherence to the traditional heritage of old fashions. During the annual festival, the people of the city are encouraged to wear the headgear to remember the past and old heritage and culture of Iraq.

American actor Mahershala Ali wears a black cap inspired by the Iraqi Sidara which he notably wore during the 2019 91st Academy Awards.

== Notable wearers ==
Among the notable wearers of the Iraqi Sidara were King Faisal I, former Iraqi prime minister Yasin al-Hashimi, Mulla Abboud al-Karkhi, and Iraqi poet al-Zahawi.

Iraqis notable for wearing the Sidara

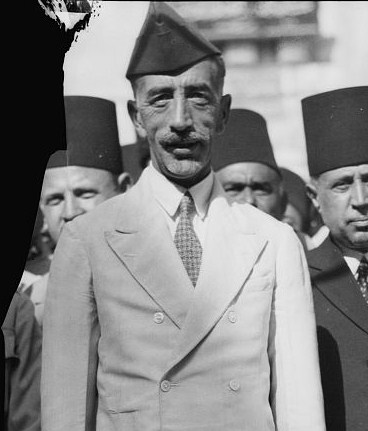
King Faisal I

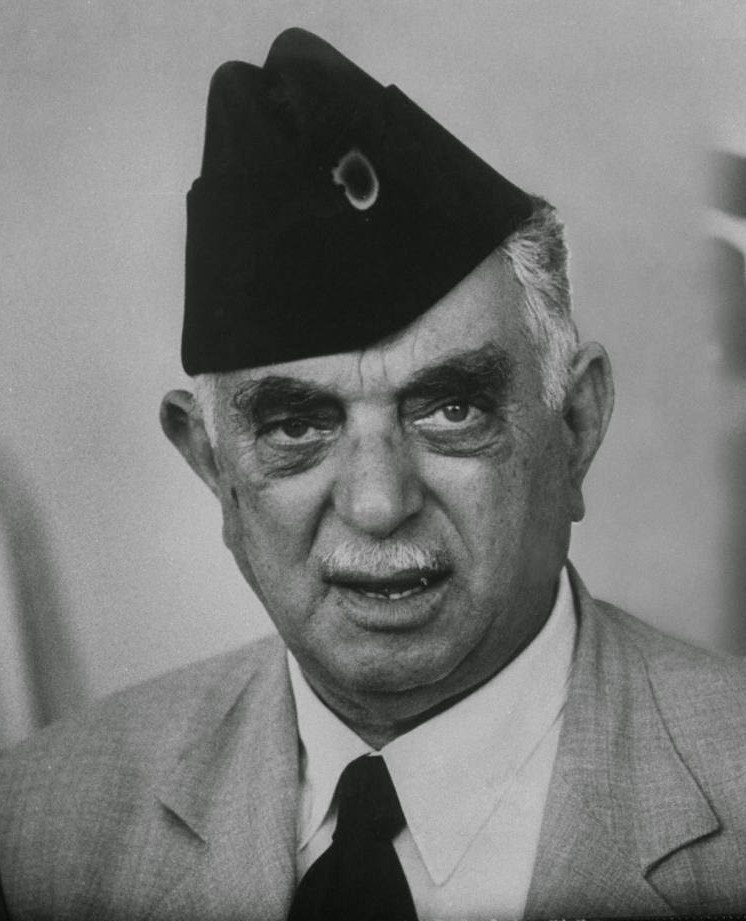
Nuri al-Said

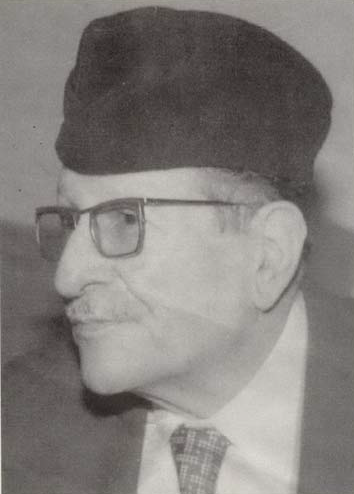
Ali al-Wardi

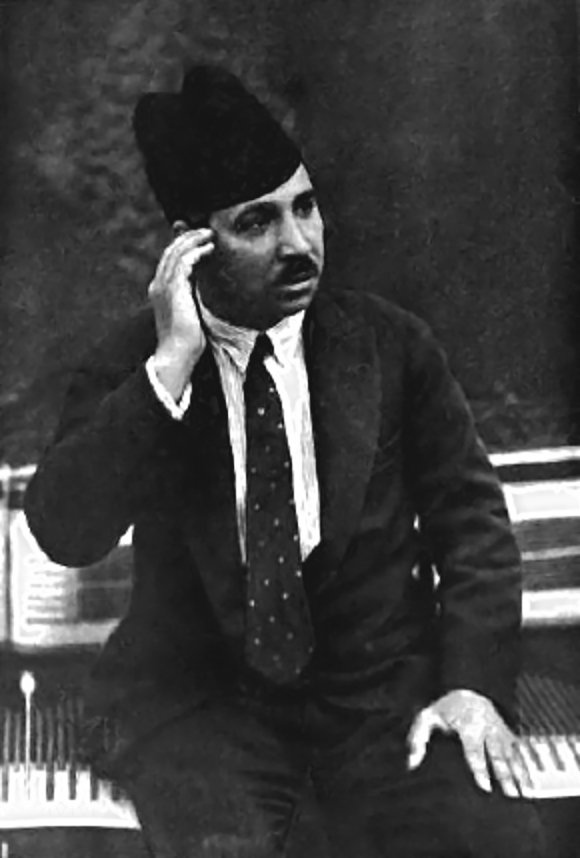
Muhammad al-Qubanchi

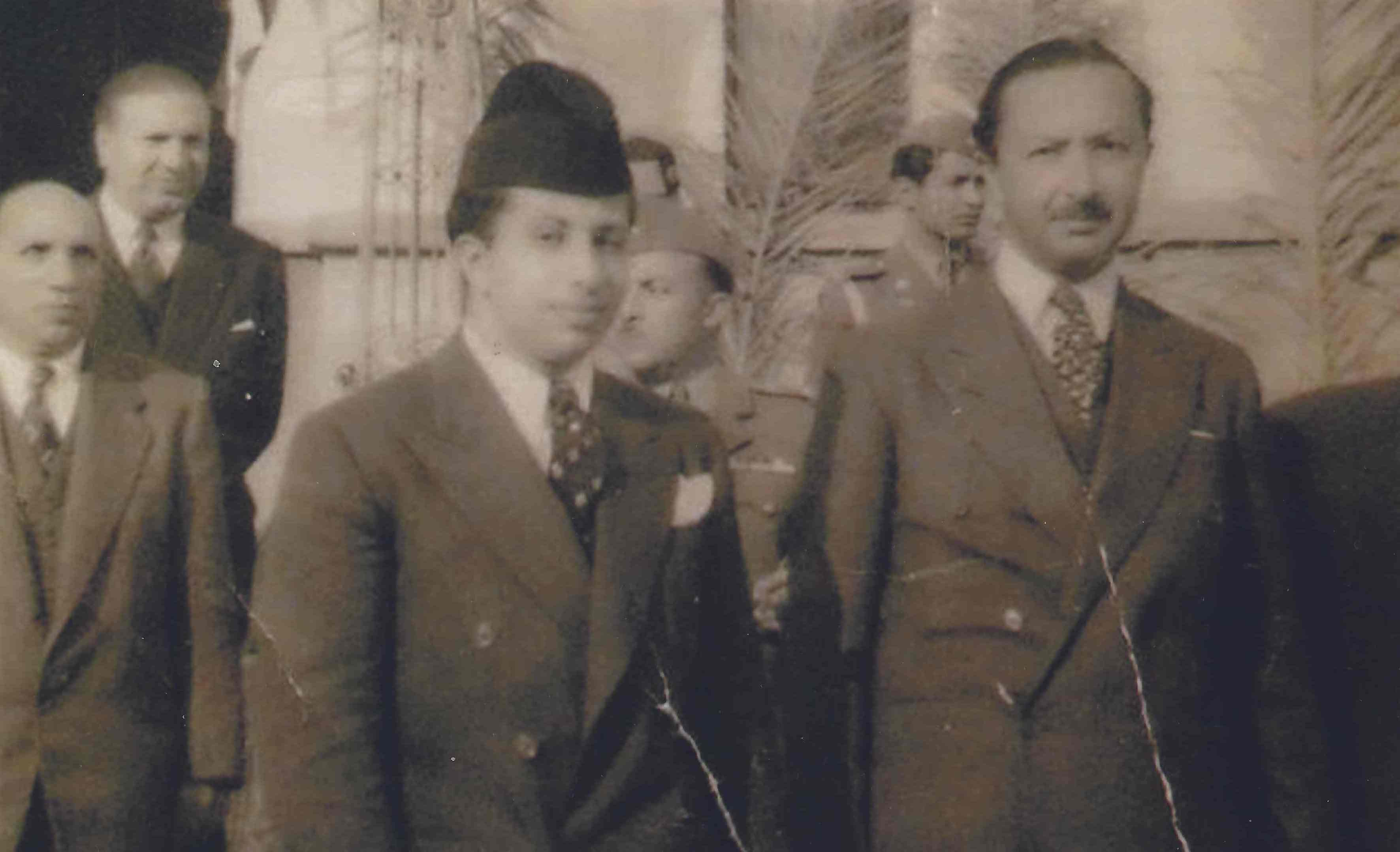
King Faisal II

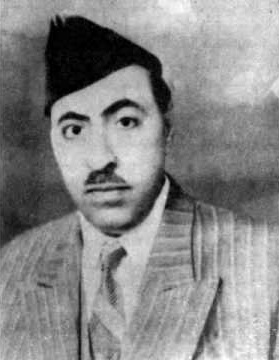
Hassan Khayukah

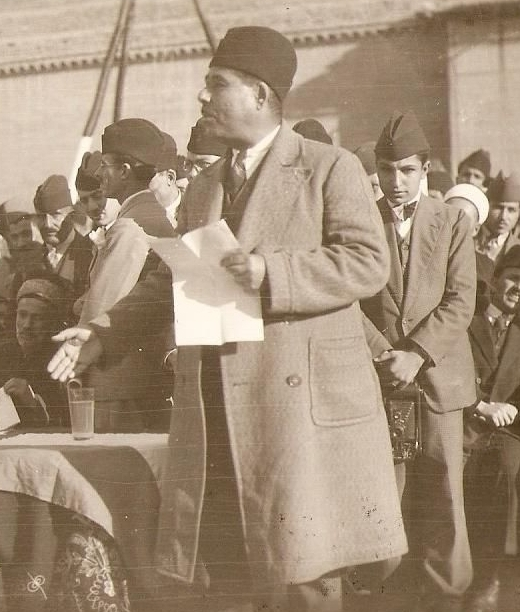
Ma'ruf al-Rusafi

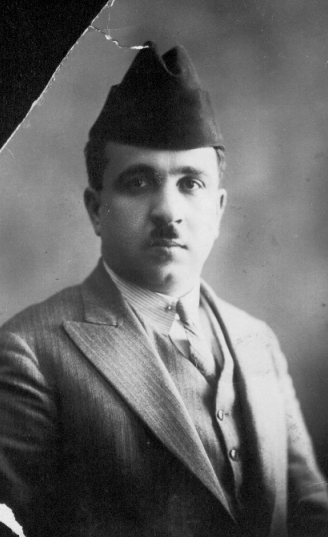
Salih Zaki Bey

== See also ==
- Araqchin
- Dhaka topi
- Gandhi cap
- List of hat styles
- List of headgear
- Plis
- Fez
- Kofia
- Skufia
