= Joze (musical instrument) =

String instrument from Iraq

- Different types of joze

String instrument
- Classification: chordophone
- Hornbostel–Sachs classification: 321.311.71 (Composite chordophone sounded by a bow)
- Developed: Traditional instrument in Iraqi music

Related instruments
- Kamancheh

Joze, also spelled joza, jawzah or djoze (Note: The name in English has several alternative transliterations. Joze is used in the The New Grove Dictionary of Musical Instruments.) (Arabic: جوزة) is a long-necked string instrument from Iraq. Its round resonance body, traditionally made from a coconut shell, is covered with animal skin and has a spike at its lower end.

== Description ==
According to the Hornbostel-Sachs classification, it is a composite spike fiddle of the chordophone group. The sound is produced by striking the strings with a simple string bow.

The instrument is made of wood, animal skin and metal for the spike and strings. Its length may range from 60 to 75 cm. It has four strings, in contrast to the rebab, which has two to three. These are attached with two pegs on either side on top of the long fretless neck which is attached to an outwardly arched resonator. This resonator was traditionally made from the empty shell of a coconut (the Arabic word joze means “nut”), but today the instrument is mostly made from other woods. There are two openings, with the smaller upper one covered with a fish skin or other types of animal skin, while the wider opening on the down side is not covered. A metal spike is fixed from the upper end of the resonator and protrudes down to the lower end of the instrument. The joze is similar to the Iranian kamancheh, except for its smaller diameter of the body.

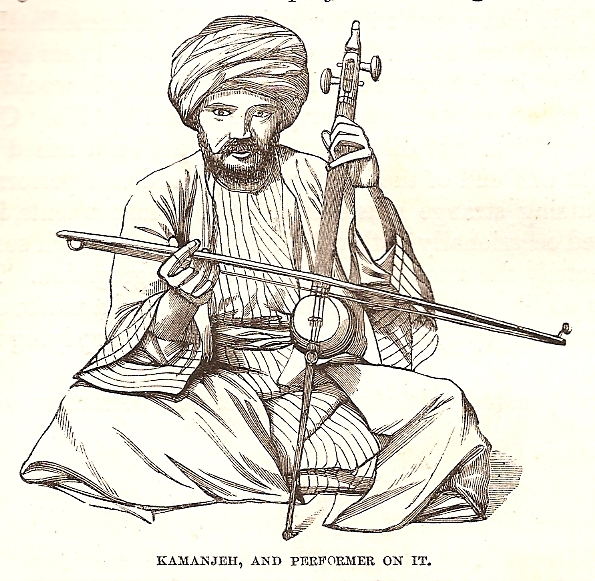
1959 illustration of a kamancheh player, similar to the playing of the joze

The joze is a traditional musical instrument in Iraq. It has been used in the small chalgi al-baghdādī (the Baghdad ensemble) of Iraqi classical music for performances of the Iraqi maqam. This musical genre was inscribed in the UNESCO Representative List of the Intangible Cultural Heritage of Humanity in 2008. When performed, the joze is set on the musician's thigh, with the neck held in the left hand and swiveled back and forth. The strings are tuned in perfect forths, usually a–d'–g'–c'', and often tuned according to the pitch of the singer's voice.

Its range is roughly two octaves, and may be enlarged by using tuning in perfect fifths as in the Western violin. In the second half of the 20th century, the joze has largely been replaced by the Western-style violin, loosing the joze's traditional sound. Additionally, it has been featured in solo performances and modern ensembles of Iraqi music and has been taught in contemporary musical schools.

The joze is related to the rebab, which is played in other musical traditions of the world, and in particular to the kamancheh used in the music of Iran and Aserbaijan, as well as to the Kabak-kemane in folk music traditions of Turkey.

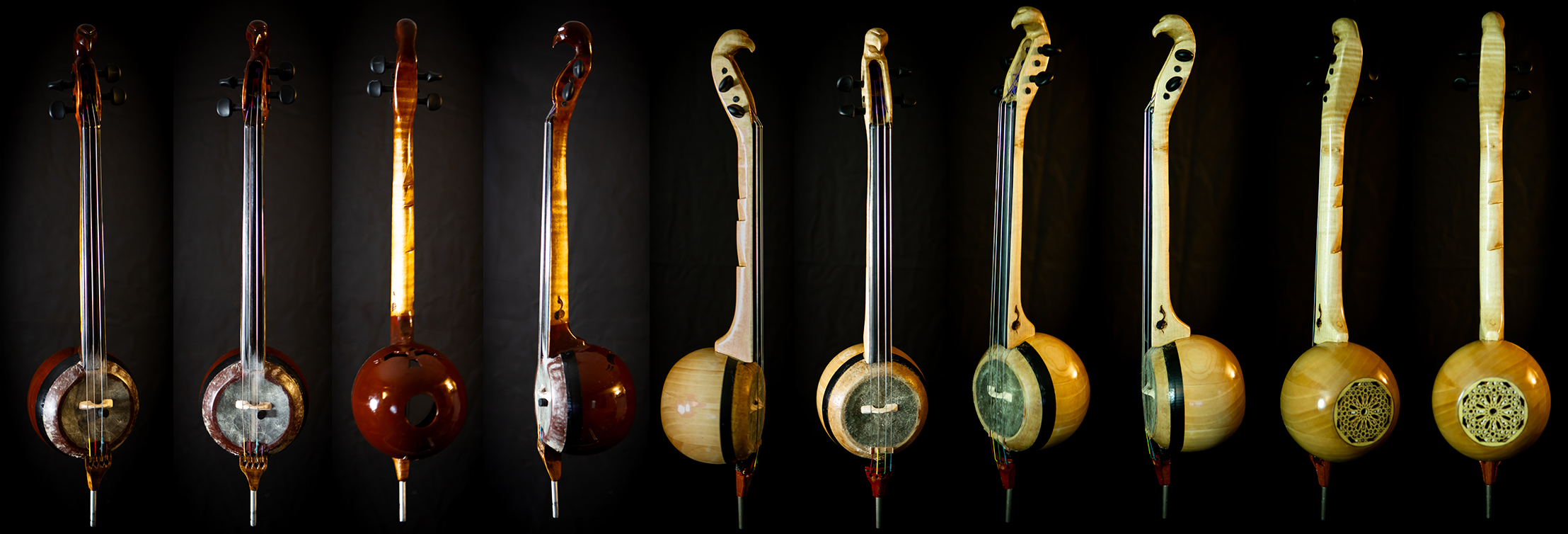
Different types of joze built by Bassem Hawar

== Modern developments ==
The Iraqi musician Bassem Hawar developed the joze in the late 20th century, so that it is suitable for different forms of music and can be played beyond traditional musical genres. Among other ensembles, Hawar has played the joze as part of the Nouruz Ensemble of Oriental music, based in Cologne, Germany.

== See also ==
- Arabic classical music
- Arabic musical instruments
- List of string instruments
