= Sahar Taha =

Iraqi musician and journalist (1957–2018)

Sahar Hadi Muhi Taha
- Born: 1957; Iraq
- Origin: Iraq
- Died: 17 August 2018 (aged 60–61); USA
- Genres: Iraqi music, Iraqi folk music, Arabic music
- Occupation: Singer
- Website: www.sahartaha.com

Sahar Taha (Arabic: سحر طه; 1957–2018) was an Iraqi musician and journalist living in Lebanon. She co-hosted the Lebanese programme Banat Hawa on LBC. She was known for playing the oud in both eastern and western music.

== Early life and career ==
In 1984 Taha received a MA in Business Administration in Baghdad, followed by a degree in oud and singing from the National Conservatory of Lebanon in 1989. In addition to her career in music, Taha was a writer for various Arabic and Lebanese newspapers and had been writing for Beirut's daily Al-Mustaqbal since 1999. She presented numerous musical programmes in the Arab media and worked for Future TV and ART television stations in the mid-1990s.

Taha served as a judge in musical festivals and programmes across Lebanon and Egypt in 1995, 2001 and 2002.

Since 1997, she was a member of The Professional Artists Syndicate, as well as a member of honor in the Munir Bashir Oud and Traditional Musical Art International Foundation, in remembrance of Iraqi oudist Munir Bashir.

Since 1986 Taha had performed in many concerts throughout the Middle East and Europe; in Lebanon, Jordan, Egypt, Tunisia, Syria, Qatar, Algeria, UAE, Germany, Austria, Italy, Holland, and her homeland of Iraq.

== Personal life ==
Taha married a Lebanese and was a naturalized Lebanese national. She still had family in Baghdad.

== Death ==
Taha died on 17 August 2018 from cancer at Henry Ford Hospital in Michigan, USA.

== Discography ==
=== Albums ===
- Baghdadiyat feat. Omar Bashir
- Traditional Iraqi songs (2003)
- Gunter Grass Tour De Jemen
- Waddaato Baghdad (2010)
- I Adore You (2012)

== Publications ==
- Baghdadi Maqamat (2006). ISBN 9953212368. In Arabic.
- From The Heart To Them Part 1.
