= Maeda Nazhat =

Iraqi singer (1937-c. 2018)

- مائدة نزهت
- Born: 1937; Baghdad, Kingdom of Iraq
- Died: c.2018
- Occupation: Singer
- Spouse: Wadih Khonda

Maeda Nazhat or Maeda Jasim Mohammed Al-Azzawi (Arabic: مائدة نزهت; 1937 – c.19 September 2018 ) was an Iraqi singer. She came to fame in the 1950s and was one of the first performers to appear on Iraqi TV. She quit singing in the 1980s.

== Early life ==
Maeda was born in Baghdad, where she grew up and attended school. From an early age, she showed talent at school events, performing songs by famous Arab singers like Umm Kulthum.

== Career ==
In the early 1950s, she won a competition at the Iraqi broadcasting agency looking for new Iraqi talents, and she became a regular singer in Iraqi radio. She became one of the first to sing on TV in 1956, and she is considered the first to sing in support of the July 14 revolution in 1958, with her two songs "Good morning, revolution morning" and "I am Iraq". Maeda was also one of few women to sing the Iraqi maqam with the Iraqi Heritage Music Orchestra, which was founded in 1974.

Nazhat and her husband, musician Wadih Khonda (also known as Samir Al-Baghdadi), were famous internationally. They traveled to many countries including Syria, Lebanon, Kuwait, and the Soviet Union, where Nazhat performed on stage or recorded songs for local radio.

== Later life ==
In the 1980s both Maeda and her husband retired from the music scene and chose to live in obscurity. It is reported that Maeda even requested that her songs no longer play on the radio. In 2003, after the US invasion of Iraq, Maeda left Iraq and moved to Jordan. She died on 19 September 2018 (or 2019) at the age of 81.
