= Amal Khudhair =

Iraqi singer (born 1950)

- Born: Amal Khudhair Dawud Al-Timimi; July 1, 1950 (age 75); Basra, Kingdom of Iraq
- Genres: Iraqi music, Arabic music
- Occupations: Singer, painter, actress, presenter.
- Years active: 1973–present

Amal Khudhair (Arabic: أمل خضيّر; born 1 July 1950 in Basra) is an Iraqi singer who lives in Baghdad and is known by some fans as the “Century's Singer”.

== Career ==
Khudhair began singing in Basra, and then moved to Baghdad with her sister Salima in 1963 to start her career. In the late 1960s she worked as a broadcaster and in the 1970s as an actress.

Khudair has performed in Iraq, Qatar, Russia, Germany, Spain and the United States.

== Discography ==
Khudair's songs include:

- Mur Fargak
- Ala Dhayyak ya Gomar
- Cristal
- Ahawel Ansa Hubbak
- Aini w Ba'ad Ainak
- Yal Alametnil Hawa
- Menel-Shubbak
- Ya Alef Wasfa w ya Hayf
- Fedwa Fedwa
- Ta'al
- Laysh Nasini
- Aany Men Yes'al Alayya
- Ya Yumma Thari Ehwai
- Mali Shughol bes-Sug
- Gulli ya-Helo
- Alal-Mi'ad Ejaytak
- Sallam Alayya
- Chi Mali Wali
- Raqi
- Analli Rabbayt
- Ya Sa'ad
- Ya Bu la'yon es-Sood
- Ma A'aruf Hachel Wajhayn
- Wain Rayeh
- Wen ya Galob
- Wa'adetni
- Oyooni
- Foog Elna Khel
- Ghayatek
- Men Ghayr Amal
- Boya Smallah
- Ana men Ashoof Ehwai
- Ana Et'abet
- Atawba Imnel Mahabba
- Awen Wanti
- Sallem Ba'yonak el Helwa
- Ana ya Tayr
- Ghaltana
- Dhal Bali Alayk
- Men Beda Aowal
- Allah ya Aen Eshkuthor
- Khallina Enshofak
- Shellak Alayya ya Zaman
- Sabah el Khayr
- Galaw Helo Kulen-Nas Tehwak

== Theater ==
- The Ghost
- The Soil
- Christ's Thorn
- The Earth
- Lamps

== Awards ==
- 1999 Century's Singer title in Alshabab TV referendum .
- 2004 Shield of the Doha Festival of Arabic Song.

== Personal life ==
Amal was secretly married for a short time in mysterious circumstances, then separated from her husband, and still divorced.
