= Hatem Al Iraqi =

Hatem Al-Iraqi حاتم مشحوت عباس المحمداوي
- Birth name: Hatem Abbas Farawi
- Born: March 20, 1969 (age 56); Baghdad, Iraq
- Origin: Iraq
- Genres: Iraqi music, Arabic music, Arabic pop music
- Occupation(s): Singer, songwriter composer
- Instrument: Vocals
- Years active: 1990s – present
- Labels: Rotana Records

Hatem Al-Iraqi (Arabic: حاتم العراقي, born March 20, 1969) is an Iraqi song writer and composer who rose to fame in the early 1990s in the Middle East. He has released over 25 albums since the start of his music career and has performed worldwide.

== Biography ==
Hatem al-Iraqi, born Hatem Abbas Farawi, on March 20, 1969, in the city of al -Thawrah, Sadr City, Baghdad, worked as an oil salesman in Sadr City before the start of his music career. He started recording music in his home town before his career took off in the late 1980s with his first ever song titled "Makhtouba" played on radio. He released his first album titled Afker Feek in 1990, with his first appearance on national television in 1991, with the song titled "Tamanite". He has collaborated with many famous Middle Eastern artists including Kathem Al Saher, Rahma Riad, Muhannad Mohsen and Shatha Hassoun. He has also appeared as a guest performer on Arab Idol on a few occasions.

== Discography ==
- 1990 – Afker Feek
- 1991 – Tmneet
- 1992 – Nihayat Hobena
- 1993 – Ween Alkak
- 1994 – Rasaʼel Ateb
- 1995 – Al-Nar
- 1996 – Ana Al-Majrouh
- 1997 – Azkrek
- 1998 – Ellilah
- 1999 – Abou Samira
- 2000 – Ya Ba'ad Qalbi
- 2001 – Bedon Tawakof
- 2002 – Amir Al-Ashiqeen
- 2004 – Khalek Ma'a
- 2005 – Mohajer
- 2006 – Ya Tair
- 2008 – Rayeh
- 2010 – Aldonia Ma Teswa
- 2012 – Zakernakem
- 2014 – Hada Al Iraki
- 2017 – Anghami
- 2017 - "Dictory"
- 2021
