= Salima Murad =

Iraqi singer (1900–1974)

Salima Murad سليمة مراد
- Image from the TV series Salima Pasha

Background information
- Also known as: Salima Pasha
- Born: 2 February 1900; Baghdad, Ottoman Empire
- Died: 28 January 1974 (aged 73) Baghdad, Iraq
- Occupation: Singer
- Years active: late 1920s-1950s
- Label: His Master's Voice
- Spouse: Nazem al-Ghazali

Salima Murad, also known as Salima Pasha, (Arabic: سليمة مراد; 2 February 1900 – 28 January 1974) was an Iraqi singer who was well-known in the Arab world during the first decades of the twentieth century. She was known as the "Voice of Baghdad" and the "Voice of Iraq".

== Life and career ==
Salima Murad was born in Baghdad into an Iraqi Jewish family as Salima Pasha. Later she adopted her father's family name Murad, as the Prime Minister, Nuri al-Sayid, was known by the honorific title “Al-Pasha”. (Note: Some sources give her family name as "Pasha" or "Pasha Murad", but most of the English and Arabic sources cited in this article refer to her during her career as Salima Murad.) In her early career, she performed as a dancer and singer for male audiences in Baghdad night clubs, where almost all musicians playing instruments were Jewish. When she started her career, singing in public was not considered acceptable for an Arab woman, but these social constraints were less strict for Jewish women and allowed for her to embark on a career as one of the most popular women singers of the time. She was respected and received high fees, appeared in private homes and on the radio and was known for helping people financially. From the late 1920s onwards, she became known as one of the most famous singers in Iraq and beyond and was called the "Voice of Iraq".

Murad was among the first Iraqi women who recorded and performed her songs on the radio. Few women like her were renowned for performing the Iraqi maqam, where she also sang light pastat and rhythmic maqams such as the Bherzawi. Pasta پﺴﺘﺔ (pl. pastat پﺴﺘﺍﺖ) is "a short song, usually in colloquial Arabic, performed at the end of an Iraqi maqam." The Iraqi Jewish musician Saleh al-Kuwaity composed many songs for her, including the song "Khadri el chai" (Brew the Tea) about a woman who refused to make tea until her beloved came. Following her visit to Baghdad in 1932, Egyptian singer Umm Kulthum performed her only Iraqi song, Salima Murad’s "Qalbak Sakhr Jalmoud" (Your Heart is a Stone), composed by Saleh al-Kuwaity. According to the poet Ibrahim Obadia, the success of Murad's songs was owed to the poetic lyrics and the “beautiful melodies in the Iraqi folk spirit” by composers such as Saleh al-Kuwaity.

In the country's first feature film, Alia and Essam (1948), Murad performed the role of Umm Essam. It was directed by French filmmaker André Chotin, and the Iraqi Jewish writer Anwar Shaul wrote the screenplay.

After some 130.000 Iraqi Jews had been stripped of their citizenship and left Iraq for Israel in the early 1950s, Murad continued to stay there until her death in 1974. However from 1950 onwards, the Iraqi government banned her songs on the radio after an antisemitic campaign. In 1953, Murad married the Iraqi singer and actor, Nazem Al-Ghazali and converted to Islam. At their respective deaths, they were buried in the Sheikh Maarouf al-Karkhi cemetery in Baghdad.

== Reception ==
At a 2019 conference on Jewish contributions to Middle East music at the King Fahd Center for Middle East Studies at the University of Arkansas, scholar Sara Manasseh presented a paper on Salima Murad as the "doyenne of Iraqi song". Among general information on Murad's career, the author mentioned that numerous recordings and collections of Iraqi music comprise songs by Murad that were appreciated "in Iraq and the Iraqi diaspora, including in Israel." In her 2020 anthology of 100 Arab musicians, French scholar Coline Houssais included a biography of Salima Murad. A 2022 PhD thesis titled The brothers Al-Kuwaity and the Iraqi song 1930–1950 discussed the close collaboration between Murad and the brothers Saleh and Daoud Al-Kuwaity, stating that Saleh had composed more than 100 of her songs.

In November 2018, the Jerusalem International Oud Festival presented a tribute to Murad with an event by Israeli musician Yair Dalal, titled "Salima Mourad: The Voice of Baghdad - a tribute to the great Iraqi vocalist."

=== In popular culture ===
Murad appears as a character in Samir Naqqash's Arabic novel Tenants and Cobwebs, when a young man falls for her and starts writing bad poetry. In Eli Amir's Hebrew novel The Dove Flyer, she is a "golden-throated enchantress" with fiery eyes who is "lethal" to young men, fans, poets, politicians and sheikhs. She improvises a song for the Jews who are leaving for Israel in 1950 about "the paths that don't come back". In Shmuel Aviezer's novel Rose Water, a Jewish boy called David talks about his family listening to a weekly programme on Radio Iraq featuring the singer Salima Murad.

In 2012, the Iraqi TV series Salima Pasha showed a fictionalized biography of the singer. The 2023 documentary Salima Murad: The Nightingale of Iraq by Al Jazeera presented interviews, commentaries and historical music videos relating to Salima Murad's life and career.

== See also ==
- Music of Iraq
- Muhammad al-Qubanchi
- Afifa Iskandar
