= Arming cap =

An arming cap was a padded fabric hood that became popular amongst the peasantry during the 13th century. It originated as quilted version of civilian coif and was worn under the helmets of 12th century knights. Fezzes were worn as arming caps.
