= Yusuf Za'arur =

Iraqi-Jewish Qanun player

Yusuf Za'arur يوسف زعرور
- Born: 1902; Baghdad, Ottoman Iraq
- Origin: Haydar Khanah Quarter, Baghdad
- Died: November 14, 1969 (aged 66–67) Tel Aviv, Israel
- Genres: Arabic, Iraqi maqam
- Occupations: Musician, Radio director

Yusuf Za'arur (Arabic: يوسف زعرور; Hebrew: יוסף זערור; 1902 – November 14, 1969) was an Iraqi-Jewish qanun player and director of the radio orchestra of Baghdad during the 1930s.

== Biography ==
Za'arur was born in 1902 in Baghdad to a noble family with many children. As a child, he was swept away by the music and melodies in the synagogue and built himself a qanun-like instrument against the wishes of his parents, who feared that music would disrupt his general studies and Torah studies at the yeshiva. At the age of fourteen, he joined a group of people who made a living from the songs of blessings on celebrations. At the age of eighteen he bought himself his first qanun and soon mastered the intricate instrument and began to play flute, violin and cello as well. At the age of twenty, he opened a school for various musical instruments that was very successful. Being such an expert in the vast knowledge he acquired and in his absolute pitch, his playing on the qanun turned from a popular tune to modern and artistic playing, and he gained a much respectable status in the music world of Baghdad. In 1931, he even participated in a performance by Sami Al-Shawwa, one of the greatest violinists of Arab music, and met the greatest composers and singers, Mohammed Abdel Wahab and Umm Kulthum, who came to Iraq.

Zaarur was an accompanied player to the famous Iraqi singer Muhammad al-Qubanchi, and together they traveled to Berlin to record on records and for recitals. Many of these were broadcast in Berlin on a station in Arabic. In addition, he and his band performed in Berlin to the Iraqi community there.

In 1932, at the First International Congress of Arab Music in Cairo, the official orchestra representing Iraq was conducted and directed by Yusuf Za'arour. He even won first place and received a medal. In 1936, Zaarour was appointed director of the musical department at the Baghdad radio station. The appointment was by then Prime Minister Nuri al-Said. As part of his work, he examined many musicians for the purpose of establishing three musical ensembles: Iraqi, Kurdish and Egyptian. As the editor of the music programs at the station, he examined many musicians for the purpose of integrating them in these programs and worked to integrate Jewish musicians. In addition, he established another band of Muslim musicians from Baghdad who played on Shabbat and Jewish holidays. Outside his formal job at the radio station, he performed before the king, government ministers and the mayor of Baghdad.

He had performed in Mandatory Palestine before the establishment of the State of Israel, in 1944, and returned to Iraq. In 1951 he realized his ambition to make Aliyah to the Land of Israel, despite his great talent and honorable position as director at the Baghdad Broadcasting Station. In 1956, during the Sinai Campaign, the BBC boycotted recitals of his that were recorded in Iraq for the station after World War II, because he was Jewish.

Za'arur Composed many songs and melodies that are still being played. Among others, he is considered to have brought to the recognition and greatness of Nazem al-Ghazali in the Arab music community.
