= Rida Al Abdullah =

Iraqi singer (born 1966)

Rida Al Abdulla عبدالرضا رحيم عبدالله
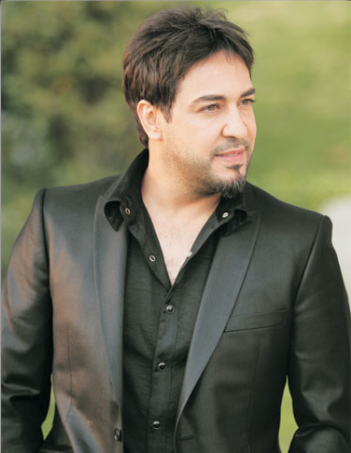

Background information
- Born: Abdelrida Raheem Abdullah; 5 July 1966 (age 60); Kirkuk, Iraq
- Genre: Pop
- Occupations: Singer, actor
- Years active: 1999–present
- Labels: Rotana (2001–2006); Melody (2009–2011)

Rida Al Abdulla (Arabic: رضا العبد الله; also spelled Rida Al Abdallah, Reda Al Abdullah; born 5 July 1966) is an Iraqi singer and actor. He gained attention across the Arab world for his singles "Bo'dak Habibi", "Qasawa", "Dhalim", "Min Trid Abousak", "Al Asabe3", "Melih Wa Zad", "Ya Hali" and other hits including "Weinkom Ya Arab" ("Where are the Arabs"), a protest song against the 2006 Lebanon-Israeli war.

His album "Yom Wa Sana" was released in July 2009 and includes 14 songs.

== Biography ==
Rida Al Abdulla was born in Iraq in 1966. His work bridges Arabic classical music (maqam) with popular styles of his region and beyond. The poetry he adapts and lyrics he composes address themes of human relationships and sociopolitical ideas.

Rida was born in Kirkuk. Rida participated in school plays and concerts, and began writing his own songs. His parents encouraged him by buying him instruments including an oud, a principle instrument of Arabic composers. At a time when singers were being pressured to sing for the regime or not at all, Rida kept a low profile but continued singing, composing and practicing at home.

Rida came of age during the Iran-Iraq war. At eighteen, he enrolled into the House of Art and Music Conservatory of Iraq in Baghdad where he studied music for the next six years. Composer Munir Bashir took an early interest in Rida, teaching him the works of Rawhy Khamash, Doctor Salem Abdel Karim, Ali Imam, and many others. Rida graduated at the top of his class as a composer and performer on the oud.

Rida continued his musical studies at the Academy of Arts, Music and Theatre. He began recording his music, although Iraq's music industry was in disarray at the time. During the invasion of Kuwait and the ensuing Gulf War, Rida composed songs that encouraged citizens to put down weapons and take up instruments. Rida's musical career was paused in 1993 when he graduated and was drafted into the Iraqi Army to serve the obligatory eighteen months. The Army refused to discharge him at the end of his service. When his parents were detained and tortured by the authorities, Rida had to support ten brothers and sisters.

In 1997, During one attempt to leave the military, Rida was caught and jailed for 100 days. He was condemned have one of his ears cut off and to spend sixteen years in prison. In addition, Rida was to have a cross tattooed to his forehead, ensuring that he would never marry or obtain a job upon his release. Rida was transferred to a military camp where he was tortured and beaten for three days. On the fourth day, in the middle of the night, two men gagged him in his cell and threw him into the trunk of a car. They drove him into the desert. The car stopped and when his blindfold was removed, Rida saw that his abductors were in fact his two brothers. They took him by his home to see his parents briefly. He was given a passport and told he had less than 24 hours to leave Iraq.

Rida set out for the Jordanian border with just a few clothes and his oud. Rida thought his crossing might take days, but within fifteen minutes the border officer called his name. Rida went to Amman, and then the college town of Irbid, where he performed in restaurants. An Emirati student helped him obtain a visa to Dubai, and he began recording music there.

Rida began performing private concerts and weddings in Dubai, and his reputation grew. His first single "Meleh Wa Zad (Salt and Food)"—a reworking of a classic—became the top song in the Emirates for 1997. His next one "Hali (My Family)" was an original composition about a man who yearns to marry for love, against the advice of his family. From there, Rida recorded three albums for Rotana/EMI, Zalim (2001), Boadak Habiby (2003), and Enha Bzaman (2005). Boadak Habiby was a crossover from classical singing into Arabic pop. Romantic themes in Rida's lyrics are parables for political woes.

In July 2009, Rida released his fourth album, "Yom Wa Sana (A Year and a Day)," a set of fourteen songs he produced and recorded. The product of four years work, this album blends traditional Iraqi songs, Arabic and Western pop from maqam to techno. It incorporates violins, oud, cello, flute, clarinet playing in an Arabic mode, also guitars, saxophones, and Western and Arabic percussion including tabla, trap drums, and rhythmic loops. Among Rida's original compositions is "La Tesafer (Don't Go)," written for his mother about the time he left Iraq in 1997. The album's title song refers to a romance Rida had as a young man in Iraq.

In 2011, Rida featured on the single 'Broy Me' with Tsevetelina Yaneva.

== Discography ==
=== Albums ===
- Yom Wa Sana 2009
- Ehna Bezaman 2006
- Bo'dak Habibi 2003
- Dhalim 2001

== See also ==
- Iraqi music
- Arab music
- 2006 Lebanon-Israeli war
- Iraqi army
