= Underground music in Iraq =

Music genre

Underground music in Iraq refers to the alternative and often subversive music scene that has grown and evolved in Iraq since the early 2000s. Despite numerous societal and governmental challenges, this underground scene has been a platform for a generation of Iraqi musicians to express their artistic vision and often controversial ideas. The music genres within the Iraqi underground scene are diverse, ranging from hard rock, hardcore and punk rock to Hip-hop to electronic music, among others.

== Overview ==
The development of underground music in Iraq can be traced back to the fall of Saddam Hussein's regime in 2003. Prior to this, strict censorship laws and societal norms severely limited the scope for musical expression. After the fall of the regime, Iraq experienced a tumultuous period of political instability and violence, during which many forms of artistic expression, including music, were stifled. Over time, however, a new generation of Iraqis seeking a voice for their struggles, fears, hopes, and dreams.

Despite facing obstacles such as conservative social norms, inadequate infrastructure, and sporadic violence, these artists found ways to create and distribute their music, often relying on the internet and social media to reach wider audiences.

== Genres ==
=== Rock and metal ===
Within Iraq’s underground music scene, various rock and metal heavy metal genres were quick to gain prominence. Iraqi musicians drew influence from a wide variety of American British rock, rock music of Canada, as well as extreme metal. These influences, combined with local social and political conditions, resonated with the angst and disillusionment of many young Iraqis. The thrash metal band Acrassicauda, formed in 2000, gained international recognition for continuing to perform amid the violence and instability of the Iraq War.

=== Hip hop and rap ===
Hip-Hop and rap developed in the streets of cities like Baghdad and Basra and have become a powerful tool of expression for Iraqi youth. The Narcicyst, an Iraqi-Canadian rapper and activist, has used the genre to speak on issues such as immigration, cultural identity, and war.

=== Electronic music ===
With the rise of digital music production tools and platforms, electronic music has gained traction within the Iraqi underground scene. This genre allows artists to experiment with traditional Iraqi sounds and modern electronic beats, creating a unique fusion that speaks to the country's complex identity.

== See also ==
- Music of Iraq
- Acrassicauda
- The Narcisyst
