= Hat Revolution =

1925 legal reform in the Republic of Turkey

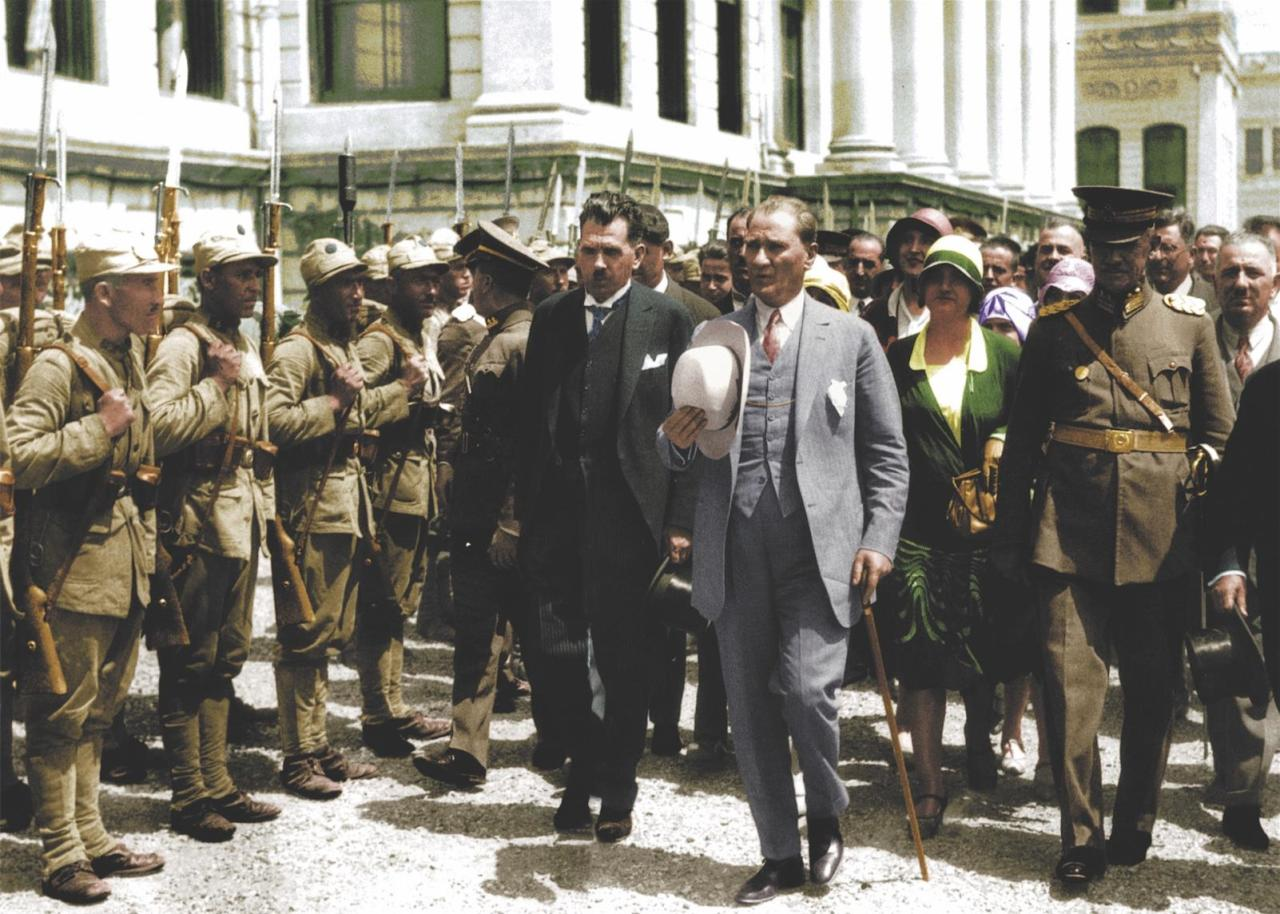
Mustafa Kemal Atatürk with his Panama hat just after the Kastamonu speech in 1925

The Hat Law was a controversial and short-lived law in Turkey that resulted in the 1925 legal regulation to ban traditional headwear by replacing them with contemporary hat styles. It was almost never enforced though it remains on the books.

== Change in professional attire ==
Before November 25, 1925, when the Hat Law was enacted, changes were seen in some professional clothes in the country. Starting from 1925, first the Republican Units in Ankara, then the gendarmerie and naval units started wearing visors. Then, new headgear and caps began to be worn in various government offices and schools. Istanbul Galata Watchmen were the first to wear new headgear and caps.

With the efforts of nurse Esma Deniz, at the Red Crescent Private Nursing School opened in Istanbul on February 21, 1925, nurse students began to wear hats instead of veils.

As of August 2, 1925, judges, bailiffs, and court clerks considered new hats in courthouses and courts. However, most people eventually continued to adhere to the fez, which they attributed a religious value, and the law in this regard effectively ended.

== Hat Law ==
With the "Law No. 671 on Hats" adopted by the parliament on November 25, 1925, the members and officials of the Grand National Assembly of Turkey were obliged to wear European hats as headgear, and the Turkish people were prohibited from continuing to wear traditional headgear such as the fez or a turban. The law entered into force after being published in the government-run Official Gazette, dated 28 November 1925. According to Article 174 of the 1982 constitution, the Hat Law is among the "revolutionary laws" of the Turkish nation (laws that cannot be repealed even if it is found to be unconstitutional).

=== Atatürk's trip to Kastamonu ===
Before the law, citizens of different religions continued to wear different headdresses and clothes, as in the Ottoman Empire. Mustafa Kemal Pasha, who wanted to eliminate religious differences in clothing, brought up the issue of wearing a hat during his trip to İnebolu and Kastamonu in the summer of 1925. He wore a wide-brimmed white hat in Kastamonu on 24 August. The reason why he wore the hat for the first time in Kastamonu; he explained that he was known in other provinces with a uniform or a fez, and he preferred the hat because they would see him for the first time in Kastamonu.

=== Hat speech ===
Mustafa Kemal Pasha, who went to İnebolu the next day, made the historical "Hat Speech" in this district. On August 27, 1925, he addressed the people in the "Turkish Hearths", saying, "They call this headgear a hat," and ensured the abandonment of expressions such as "civilized hat", which were used until that time. In his speech, he said, 'Like a Redingote, a bonnet, a tuxedo, here's your hat! There are those who say that it is not permissible. Let me tell them that they are very heedless and very ignorant, and I would like to ask them: "It is permissible to wear the Greek fez, but it is not to wear the hat? I would like to remind them, the whole nation, that when they wear the robe, which is the guise of Byzantine priests and Jewish rabbis, for what and how did they wear it?'".

=== Passage of the law by Parliament ===
When Mustafa Kemal Pasha returned to Ankara on September 1, 1925, it was seen that those who came to greet him were wearing hats. On September 2, the decree of the council of ministers numbered 2431, which obliges civil servants to wear hats, was issued. On the same day, by the decree of the Council of Ministers, people other than clergy were prohibited from wearing robes and turbans.

On October 16, 1925, Konya member of parliament Refik Bey and his acquaintances presented the proposal for the law on wearing hats to the parliament. The proposal began to be discussed in the parliament on 25 October. In the justification of the law, it was emphasized that the turban and fez symbolized backwardness, so it should be changed. Bursa member of parliament Nureddin Pasha, claiming that this law is unconstitutional and demanding that the proposal be withdrawn, caused great debates to be taken place in the parliament. In addition to those who claimed that the dress of the society could not be determined by laws, there were also those who claimed that this law would facilitate the separation of religion and state affairs. As a result of the voting in which only Nureddin Pasha and Ergani member of parliament İhsan Bey voted against, the law was passed by the parliament.

=== Resistance to the Hat Law ===
The law caused protests in various Anatolian provinces. On the day the law was passed, there were protest demonstrations in Erzurum and martial law was declared in this province for a month. Among those arrested, 13 people were sentenced to death. On 25 November, all the mukhtars of the city were arrested for hanging posters and leaflets against hats on the walls in Sivas; those who were found not guilty were acquitted; Imamzade Mehmet Necati Efendi and Abdurrahman Efendi were sentenced to death. Hacı Sabit Civelek, imam of the Merkez Mosque in the Güneysu region of Rize, said, "If your father puts a hat on his head, his murder is obligatory! You will shoot him! And if your mother is a widow, you will bring her on your back!". He started the revolt in the region with these words.

Ziya Hurşit telegraphed the situation to Ankara, as the rebels, who wanted to wear traditional Laz clothes rather than "religious bigotry", marched towards the centre of Rize. Thereupon, the cruiser Hamidiye sailed to Rize to intimidate. With the cruiser's arrival in the city, most of the rebels surrendered and 143 people were arrested as a result of the events that lasted for about ten days. Since 8 of those arrested were illiterate, they could not defend themselves and were executed. Of the 8 people, 3 were hanged in front of the Tan Hotel, 3 in the municipal park and 2 at the beginning of the pier. Dozens of detainees were decided to be imprisoned in Adana and Sinop. In Marash, those who gathered around the Kahramanmaraş Grand Mosque shouting "We don't want hats" were arrested, and 5 people were sentenced to death. In Istanbul, especially in Fatih district, many people were accused of inciting the people to revolt with their speeches, and were arrested and subsequently tried in Ankara.

== Cultural references ==
The Little Prince has a section about this law. It describes with pictures how a Turkish astronomer's discovery of Asteroid B-612 was initially dismissed in a congress because of his traditional clothing. After a change in Turkish dress laws, he presented his findings again in European attire in 1920, and his discovery was accepted.
