= Hamid al-Saadi =

Iraqi maqam virtuoso

Hamid al-Saadi (born 1958) is the foremost singer of Iraqi Maqam – a form of Arab poetry, sung in a traditional way. He has mastered all 56 pieces in the repertoire of Baghdad and now performs them in America, having moved to New York in 2018.
