= Nazem al-Ghazali =

Iraqi musical artist (1921-1961)

Nazem al-Ghazali ناظم الغزالي
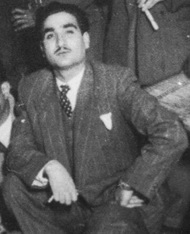
- Nazem al-Ghazali in 1946/47

Background information
- Born: 1921; Baghdad, Kingdom of Iraq
- Origin: Haydar Khanah Quarter, Baghdad
- Died: 23 October 1963 (aged 41–42) Baghdad, Iraqi Republic
- Genres: Arabic music, Iraqi maqam
- Occupations: Vocalist, songwriter
- Years active: 1940s-1960s
- Spouse: Salima Murad

Nazem al-Ghazali (Arabic: ناظم الغزالي, given name also spelled Nazim, Nadhim, Nadhem or Nathem; 1921 – 23 October 1963) was an Iraqi singer, considered one of the notable figures in Iraqi music of the 20th century.

== Life and career ==
Nazem al-Ghazali was born by a blind mother in the Haydar-Khana locality in Baghdad and attended primary and middle school in the Al-Maamouniyah School in the same city.

Having to earn the money for his studies, he enrolled in theatre studies at the Baghdad Institute of Fine Arts. He started his career as an actor and taught himself at the same time as a singer, listening to Umm Kulthum, Mohammed Abdul Wahab, Farid Al-Atrash, Asmahan, and Leila Mourad. In 1942, he performed in the play Layla and Majnun by the Egyptian poet and playwright Ahmed Shawqi.

After 1947, he performed at Radio Iraq and was a member of the Andalusian Muwashshah Ensemble. During that period, he worked with oud player Jamil Bashir, and together they produced popular songs, such as "Fog el-Nakhal" and "Marrou 'Alayya el-Hilween".

He also studied with Muhammad al-Qubanchi, one of the most prominent Iraqi maqam singers of the 20th century. Al-Ghazali was renowned for his popular songs and Iraqi maqams. His ensemble consisted of prominent musicians, with blind musicians playing the ney and the qanun. They were usually the two musicians seated directly behind Nazem during his concerts.

In 1953, he married his musical partner, the Iraqi Jewish singer Salima Murad, who had converted to Islam. The couple had their own nightclub in Baghdad and toured Europe in the 1950s. In 1963, he played a role in the film Ya Salam al hubb starring the Lebanese singer and actress Najah Salam.

Al-Ghazali died in his early 40s on 23 October 1963, when he just had returned from a concert in Beirut. After their death, al-Ghazali and later Murad were buried in the Sheikh Maarouf al-Karkhi cemetery in Baghdad.

== List of songs ==
- Fog El nakhal
- Talaa Min Beit Abuha
- Ayartni Bil-Shaeb
- Tusbukh Ala Kheir
- Gulli Ya Hilu
- Hayak Baba Hayak
- Shlon
- Ma Rida
- Ahebak
- Samraa

== Reception ==
The 2015 documentary Nazem al-Ghazali: The Singer who changed Iraqi Singing by Al Jazeera presented interviews, commentaries and historical music videos relating to al-Ghazali's life and career. In 2017, French public radio France Culture published a podcast in French about Nazem and Salima.

In her 2020 anthology of 100 Arab musicians, French scholar Coline Houssais included a biography of Nazem al-Ghazali. On 21 October 2021, Al-Jazeera published an article commemorating al-Ghazali's life and career. Quoting Iraqi artists of the 21st century, the article mentioned the appreciation and high esteem al-Ghazali still enjoys in modern Iraq. In memory of his artistic career, a musical ensemble was created by the Iraqi artist Najah Abdul Ghafour that performed at festivals, including the Jerash Festival in Jordan.

== See also ==
- Music of Iraq
