= Haitham Yousif =

Iraqi-Assyrian singer, composer and songwriter (born 1969)

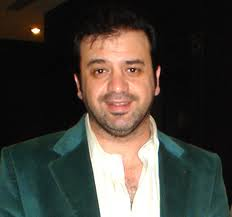

Background information
- Born: Haitham Abed Yousif Sadiq; November 29, 1969 (age 56); Baghdad, iraq
- Origin: Iraq
- Genre: Pop
- Occupations: Singer, songwriter, composer
- Instruments: Vocals, lute
- Years active: 1983–present
- Label: Casablanca
- Website: http://haitham-yousif.com

Haitham Yousif (born Haitham Abed Yousif Sadiq, (Arabic: هيثم عبد يوسف صادق, Syriac: ܗܝܬܡ ܝܘܣܦ), November 29, 1969) is an Iraqi singer, composer and songwriter. He is referred as the Prince of Love in the Middle East.

== Biography ==
Haitham Yousif was born in Baghdad, Iraq on November 29, 1969, to Assyrian parents originally from the town of Alqosh.

His musical career started at a young age in 1983, in his participation in a band of Baghdad children. He had to overcome many obstacles and hardships as a young aspiring singer before achieving fame.

Yousif was initially featured on Mix tapes from Casablanca (an Iraqi music production company). His first song "Ma Asalhak" was viewed on Iraqi TV in 1989. His breakthrough single "Ya Nas" ("O people") in 1992, gave him success. His first album titled "Ya Nas" was released in 1993 with the song "Ya Nas" chosen in 1994 TV poll as the best Iraqi song of that year, That same year he was also chosen Iraqi singer of the year.

He went on to record 5 musical albums including love songs, nostalgic songs specially sung for Iraq and a sport song "Farahtona" dedicated to the Iraqi soccer team.

=== 2000–present ===
Yousif recorded Rabil 7 more successful musical albums and shot more than 40 music videos. Since the 2003 Iraq invasion, he has performed worldwide including Australia and Europe. In 2009 Yousif had a dispute with Lebanese singer Ayman Zabib after he performed some of his songs without the permission of Yousif, and used them in his album. In 2017 he released his single titled Hedi Hedi with a music video filmed in Turkey.

== Personal life ==
Yousif is not married. He currently lives in Michigan, USA and is a General Manager/Partner at Sundus Marogy Dentistry. Football is one of his hobbies, and is a fan of the Al Zawra'a Football Club. He is a fan of The Beatles. In 2014, he launched his official YouTube channel. Yousif appeared in a show with presenter Ali Al Khalidy on Al Sharqiya TV channel in October 2021 after a 13-year media hiatus.

== Discography ==
- 1993 – Ya Nas
- 1994 – Shefed Alnadam
- 1996 – Eshtagena
- 1997 – Layonha
- 1998 – Kadhaba
- 2000 – Ameer Al Hob (The Prince of Love)
- 2001 – Telepathy Love
- 2004 – Ahbab Al Roh
- 2006 – Asmar
- 2008 – Ashofak Helem
- 2012 – Ensaha
- 2014 – Awal Aloshaq

== Singles ==
- 2015 – Aya Nas
- 2016 – Areed Wyah
- 2016 – Shwya Hes
- 2017 – Hedi Hedi
- 2017 – Yarab Efrjha
- 2017 – Khali Asfen
- 2018 – Khadem
- 2018 – Hobna Wena
- 2019 – Ha yaba shqlna
- 2019 – Iraqeen Abtaal
- 2020 – Bik o Blyak
- 2020 – Eni bsaati
- 2020 – Ta3abna Hway
- 2020 – Mayhmni
- 2021 – Hobak kadar
- 2021 – Tfarqna
- 2021 – Qosat Hobna featuring Mustafa Al Rubaiy
