= Muhammad al-Qubanchi =

Iraqi maqam singer (1904-1989)

Muhammad al-Qubanchi محمد القبانچي
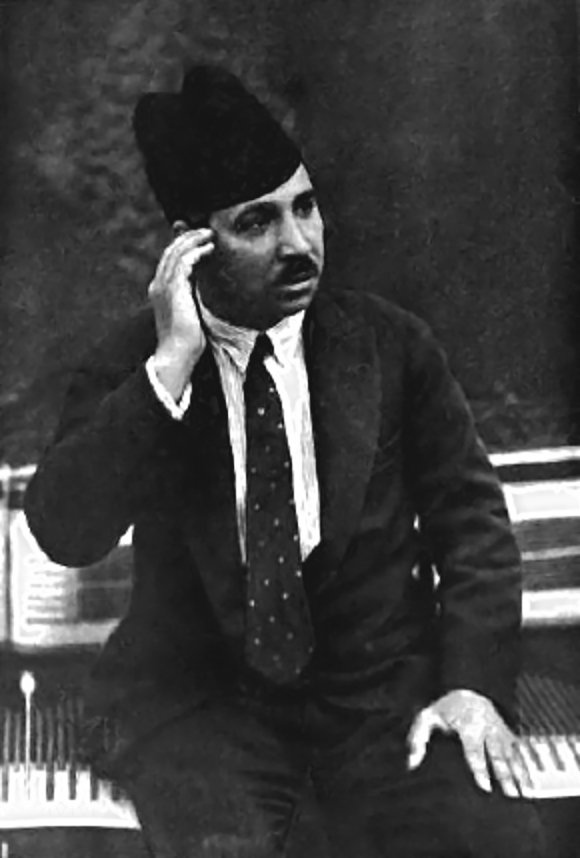

Background information
- Born: Muhammad Abd al-Razzaq al-Ta’i; 1904; Baghdad, Ottoman Iraq
- Died: April 2, 1989 (age 84–85) al-Karkh district, Iraq
- Genres: Arabic classical music
- Occupations: Singer, Maqam reciter
- Years active: 1920s–1960s

Muhammad al-Qubanchi (Arabic: محمد القبانچي), born Muhammad Abd al-Razzaq al-Ta’i (Arabic: محمد عبد الرزاق الطائي) was an Iraqi maqam singer. He was one of the pioneers in the development of the Iraqi maqam who modernized it and is considered one of the most prominent maqam reciters in Iraq.

== Early life ==
Muhammad Abd al-Razzaq al-Ta’i was born in Baghdad in 1904, and he worked with his father in the Shorja market. He later was nicknamed "al-Qubanchi", a title given to someone who is skilled in weighing agricultural crops with a scale, which also referred to his father's profession. At a young age, he was introduced to Iraqi maqam and its origins, which is where his love for the genre began. He also met with many maqam lovers at the market and the Kadouri Café. At age 12, he excelled in singing maqam and other Arabic genres and also practiced theatrical acting.

== Career ==
Al-Qubanchi first considered becoming a grain merchant but decided to depend on singing in order to maintain his social position and income. He mastered the Iraqi Maqam by his 20s and attended the Cairo Congress of Arab Music in 1932 as the leader of the Iraqi delegation in the presence of King Fuad I of Egypt. There he met the Egyptian artists Umm Kulthum and Mohammed Abdel Wahab. Reportedly, Egyptian poet Ahmed Shawqi met with al-Qubanchi and told him "This is a great heritage, and you are a great Iraqi artist."

Al-Qubanchi's renewal of the performance of the Iraqi Maqam is considered a major shift in the development of Iraqi music. Despite opposition from the supporters of the older styles, he was able to create a new school of maqam with clear features, and his students were able to preserve it. His teachings became standard in the performance of the maqam and among his students, including Yousuf Omar, Nazem al-Ghazali and Abd al-Rahman Khader.

Among his most important achievements is his use of Arabic lyrical song traditions, such as Muwashahat, Groans, Mawwal, and the Egyptian Dawr. In their combination with the Iraqi maqam he made this Iraqi form of maqam familiar in other Arabic countries.

== Later life ==
On May 28, 1969, al-Qubanchi announced his retirement and moved to al-Karkh district where he used his money to build a mosque, that he had seen in a dream. He also became its first preacher in 1977. On the evening of April 2, 1989, he died in Ibn al-Bitar Hospital and was buried in the mosque he had built.

=== Al-Qubanchi Mosque ===
Al-Qubanchi Mosque (Arabic: جامع القبانچي) is a mosque financed by Muhammad al-Qubanchi, located in the Karkh District. Al-Qubanchi had originally commissioned an architect to design a special house for him after retirement. But reportedly one night he heard "O' Muhammad, this is a place for prayer, not for sleep" in his sleep. He woke up and scrapped the ideas for his house and converted them into a mosque. The mosque was built at his own expense and opened in 1977 in the presence of the Minister of Awqaf at the time. He was also its first preacher and muezzin and took care of the mosque himself, praying there every Friday.

== Legacy ==
The Hungarian composer and pianist Béla Bartók wrote about al-Qubanchi when he visited the Cairo Congress of Arab Music: "No Arab artist, other than the rural colors or the color of the city, presented a great performance filled with all the elements of drama, and I can even say that the Iraqi performer rose to the peak level in musical performance."

== See also ==
- Arabic classical music
