= Culture of Kuwait =

Traditional Kuwaiti wedding dress in the 1970s.

Culture of Kuwait describes the cultural aspects of the Kuwaiti society and is part of the Eastern Arabian culture. Kuwaiti popular culture, in the form of dialect poetry, film, theatre, radio and television soap opera, flourishes and is even exported to neighboring states. Within the Arab states of the Persian Gulf, the culture of Kuwait is the closest to the culture of Bahrain.

== Arts ==
=== Performing arts ===
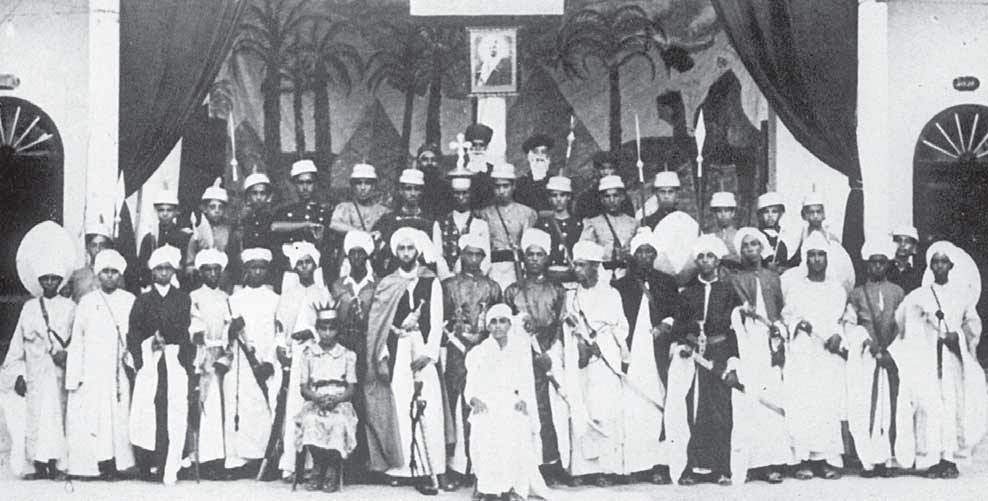
A theatrical play titled "Fateh Masr" at Al Mubarikya school in the 1940s

Kuwait has the oldest performing arts industry in the Arabian Peninsula. Kuwait is the main centre of scenographic and performing arts education in the GCC region. Many famous Arab actors and singers attribute their success to training in Kuwait. The Higher Institute of Theatrical Arts (HIDA) provides higher education in theatrical arts.

=== Television and soap operas ===
Kuwait's television drama industry is the largest and most active Gulf Arab drama industry and annually produces a minimum of fifteen serials. Kuwait is the main production center of the Gulf television drama and comedy scene. Most Gulf television drama and comedy productions are filmed in Kuwait. Kuwaiti soap operas are the most-watched soap operas in the Gulf region. Soap operas are most popular during the time of Ramadan, when families gather to break their fast. Although usually performed in the Kuwaiti dialect, they have been shown with success as far away as Tunisia.

=== Theatre ===
Kuwait is known for its home-grown tradition of theatre. It is the only country in the Gulf with a theatrical tradition. The theatrical movement in Kuwait constitutes a major part of the country's cultural life. Theatrical activities in Kuwait date back to the 1920s when the first spoken dramas were released. Theatre activities are still popular today.

Kuwait is frequently dubbed the "Hollywood of the Gulf" due to the popularity of its television soap operas and theatre. Theatre in Kuwait is subsidized by the government, previously by the Ministry of Social Affairs and now by the National Council for Culture, Arts, and Letters (NCCAL). Every urban district has a public theatre. The public theatre in Salmiya is named after the late actor Abdulhussain Abdulredha. The annual Kuwait Theater Festival is the largest theatrical arts festival in Kuwait.

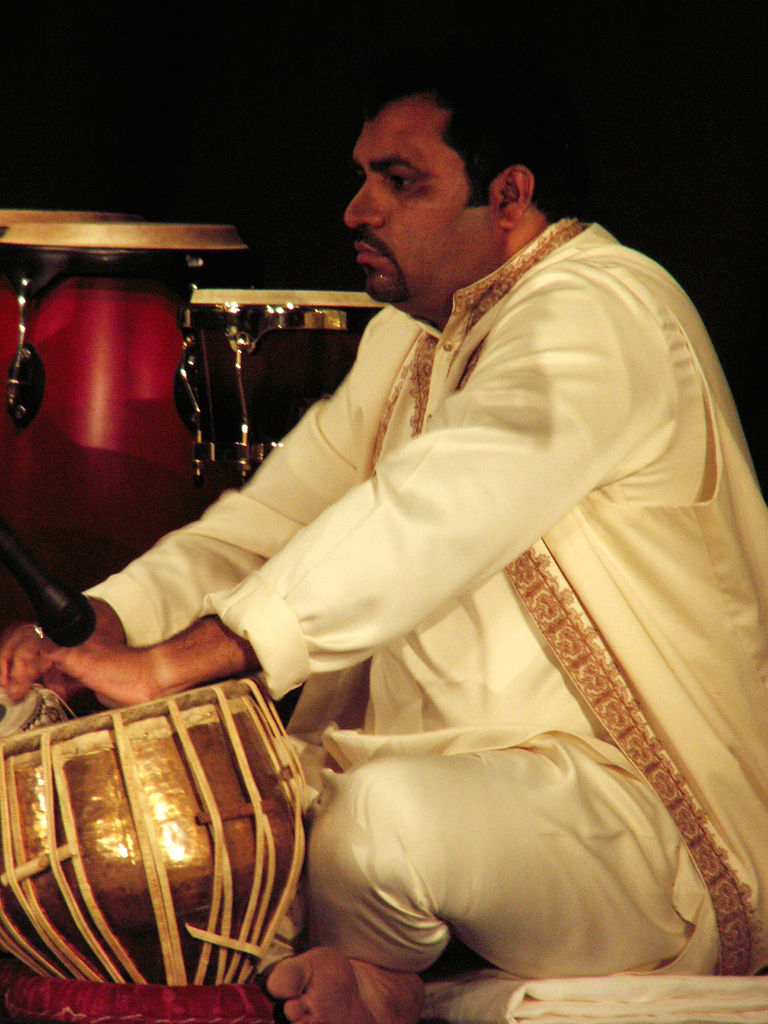
Tabla player at the 8th International Music Festival in Kuwait

=== Music ===
Kuwait is the birthplace of various popular musical genres, such as sawt and fijiri. Traditional Kuwaiti music is a reflection of the country's seafaring heritage, which was influenced by many diverse cultures. Kuwait is widely considered the centre of traditional music in the GCC region. Kuwaiti music has considerably influenced the music culture in other GCC countries.

Kuwait pioneered contemporary Khaliji music. Kuwaitis were the first commercial recording artists in the Gulf region. The first known Kuwaiti recordings were made between 1912 and 1915.

Kuwait is home to various music festivals, including the International Music Festival hosted by the National Council for Culture, Arts and Letters (NCCAL). The Sheikh Jaber Al-Ahmad Cultural Centre contains the largest opera house in the Middle East. Kuwait has several academic institutions specializing in university-level music education. The Higher Institute of Musical Arts was established by the government to provide bachelor's degrees in music. In addition, the College of Basic Education offers bachelor's degrees in music education. The Institute of Musical Studies offers music education qualifications equivalent to secondary school.

Kuwait has a reputation for being the central music influence of the GCC countries. Over the last decade of satellite television stations, many Kuwaiti musicians have become household names in other Arab countries. For example, Bashar Al Shatty became famous due to Star Academy. Contemporary Kuwaiti music is popular throughout the Arab world. Nawal El Kuwaiti, Nabeel Shoail and Abdallah Al Rowaished are the most popular contemporary performers.

=== Visual arts ===
Kuwait has the oldest modern arts movement in the Arabian Peninsula. Beginning in 1936, Kuwait was the first Gulf country to grant scholarships in the arts. The Kuwaiti artist Mojeb al-Dousari was the earliest recognized visual artist in the Gulf region. He is regarded as the founder of portrait art in the region. The Sultan Gallery was the first professional Arab art gallery in the Gulf.

Kuwait is home to more than 30 art galleries. In recent years, Kuwait's contemporary art scene has boomed. Khalifa Al-Qattan was the first artist to hold a solo exhibition in Kuwait. He founded a new art theory in the early 1960s known as "circulism". Other notable Kuwaiti artists include Sami Mohammad, Thuraya Al-Baqsami and Suzan Bushnaq.

The government organizes various arts festivals, including the Al Qurain Cultural Festival and Formative Arts Festival. The Kuwait International Biennial was inaugurated in 1967, more than 20 Arab and foreign countries have participated in the biennial. Prominent participants include Layla Al-Attar. In 2004, the Al Kharafi Biennial for Contemporary Arab Art was inaugurated.

== Literature ==
Kuwait has in recent years produced several prominent contemporary writers such as Ismail Fahd Ismail, author of numerous novels and short story collections. Taleb al-Refai, Laila al-Othman, Taibah Al-Ibrahim, Najma Idrees, and Fatimah Yousif al-Ali are also among the pioneering writers. There is evidence that Kuwaiti literature has long been interactive with English and French literature.

In 1958, Al Arabi magazine was first published, the magazine went on to become the most popular magazine in the Arab world. Ismail Fahd Ismail was one of the first Kuwaiti writers to achieve success in the Arab world, authoring over twenty novels and numerous short story collections.

=== Folklore ===
Kuwaiti folklore contains a wealth of mythical figures that were often used in cautionary tales for children and young men. These tales intended to encourage children to perform chores they would otherwise be reluctant to do, or to keep them off the streets during the night. Some of these include:

- Hemarat Al-Gayla: A donkey-woman hybrid creature said to follow children who ventured outside alone during the day. The purpose of this tale was to scare children into staying indoors during the hot summer afternoons.
- Tantal: A tall, black man with disheveled hair, carrying a large staff, known to strike his victims. He was used by parents to frighten children from wandering out at night.
- Al-Seolu: A tall Nubian slave with elongated teeth, known for kidnapping and cannibalizing children. This figure became especially popular after the disappearance of a child in 1910, with local lore stating that Al-Seolu ate the child.
- Um Al-Sa'af Wa-Alleef: A grotesque woman who could fly using a palm frond. Although not overtly harmful, she was used to frighten children into compliance.
- Al-Duaidea: A supernatural figure who conjures a mystical glowing ember that disappears when approached.
- Bu Darya: A malevolent and colossal half-human half-amphibian who preyed on those out at sea. He was meant to symbolize the dangers awaiting sailors on the high seas.

== Museums ==
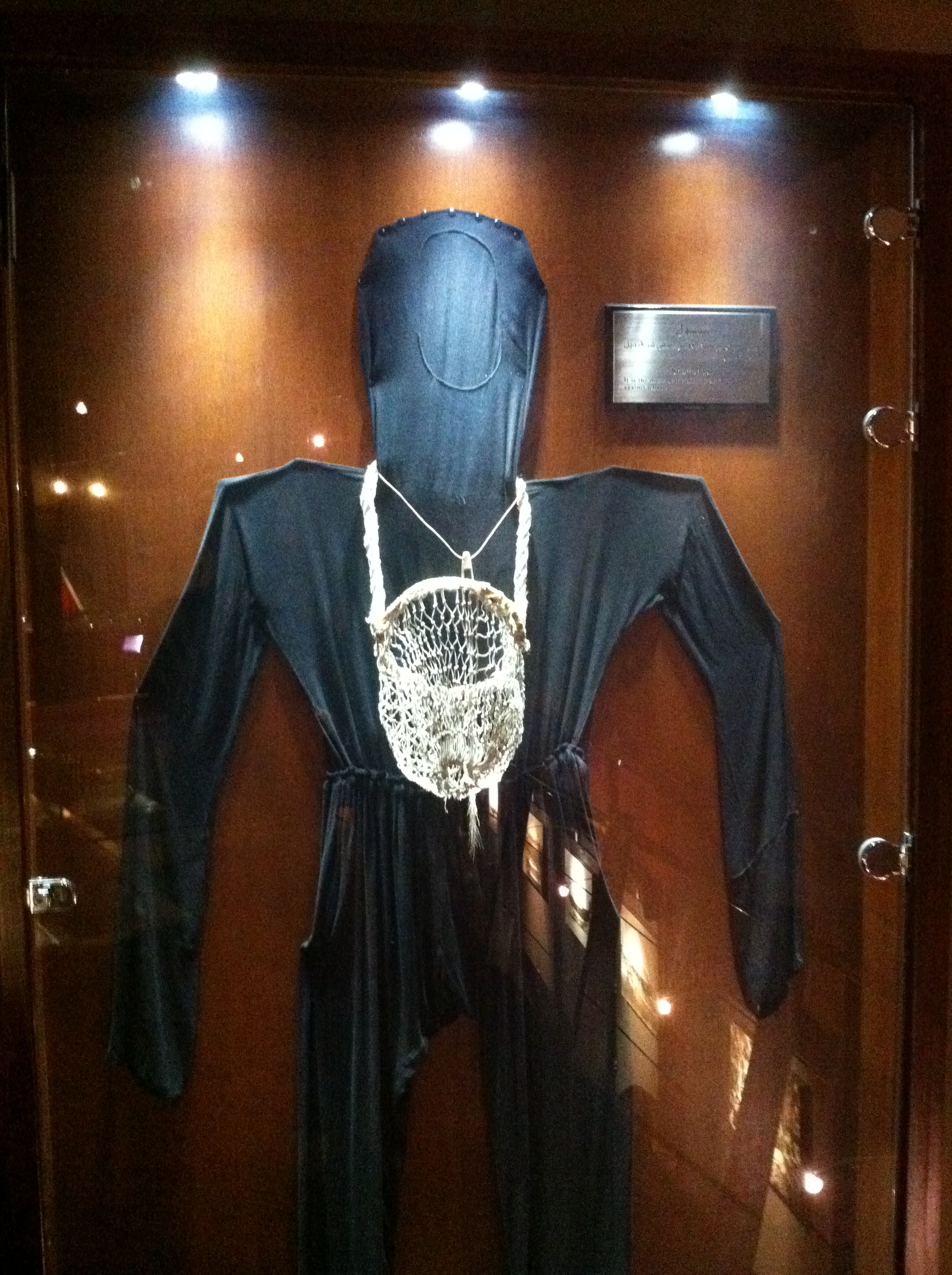
A piece of clothing used by Kuwaiti divers searching for pearls seen in Al-Hashemi-II Marine Museum in Kuwait City.

The new Kuwait National Cultural District (KNCD) consists of various cultural venues including Sheikh Abdullah Al Salem Cultural Centre, Sheikh Jaber Al Ahmad Cultural Centre, Al Shaheed Park, and Al Salam Palace. With a capital cost of more than US$1 billion, it is one of the largest cultural districts in the world. The Abdullah Salem Cultural Centre is the largest museum complex in the Middle East. The Kuwait National Cultural District is a member of the Global Cultural Districts Network.

Sadu House is among Kuwait's most important cultural institutions. Bait Al-Othman is the largest museum specializing in Kuwait's history. The Scientific Center is one of the largest science museums in the Middle East. The Museum of Modern Art showcases the history of modern art in Kuwait and the region. The Kuwait Maritime Museum presents the country's maritime heritage in the pre-oil era. Several traditional Kuwaiti dhow ships are open to the public, such as Fateh Al-Khayr and Al-Hashemi-II which entered the Guinness Book of World Records as the largest wooden dhow ever built. The Historical, Vintage, and Classical Cars Museum displays vintage cars from Kuwait's motoring heritage. The National Museum, established in 1983, has been described as "underused and overlooked".

Several Kuwaiti museums are devoted to Islamic art, most notably the Tareq Rajab Museums and Dar al Athar al Islamiyyah cultural centres. The Dar al Athar al Islamiyyah cultural centres include education wings, conservation labs, and research libraries. There are several art libraries in Kuwait. Khalifa Al-Qattan's Mirror House is the most popular art museum in Kuwait. Many museums in Kuwait are private enterprises. In contrast to the top-down approach in other Gulf states, museum development in Kuwait reflects a greater sense of civic identity and demonstrates the strength of civil society in Kuwait, which has produced many independent cultural enterprises.

== Cuisine ==
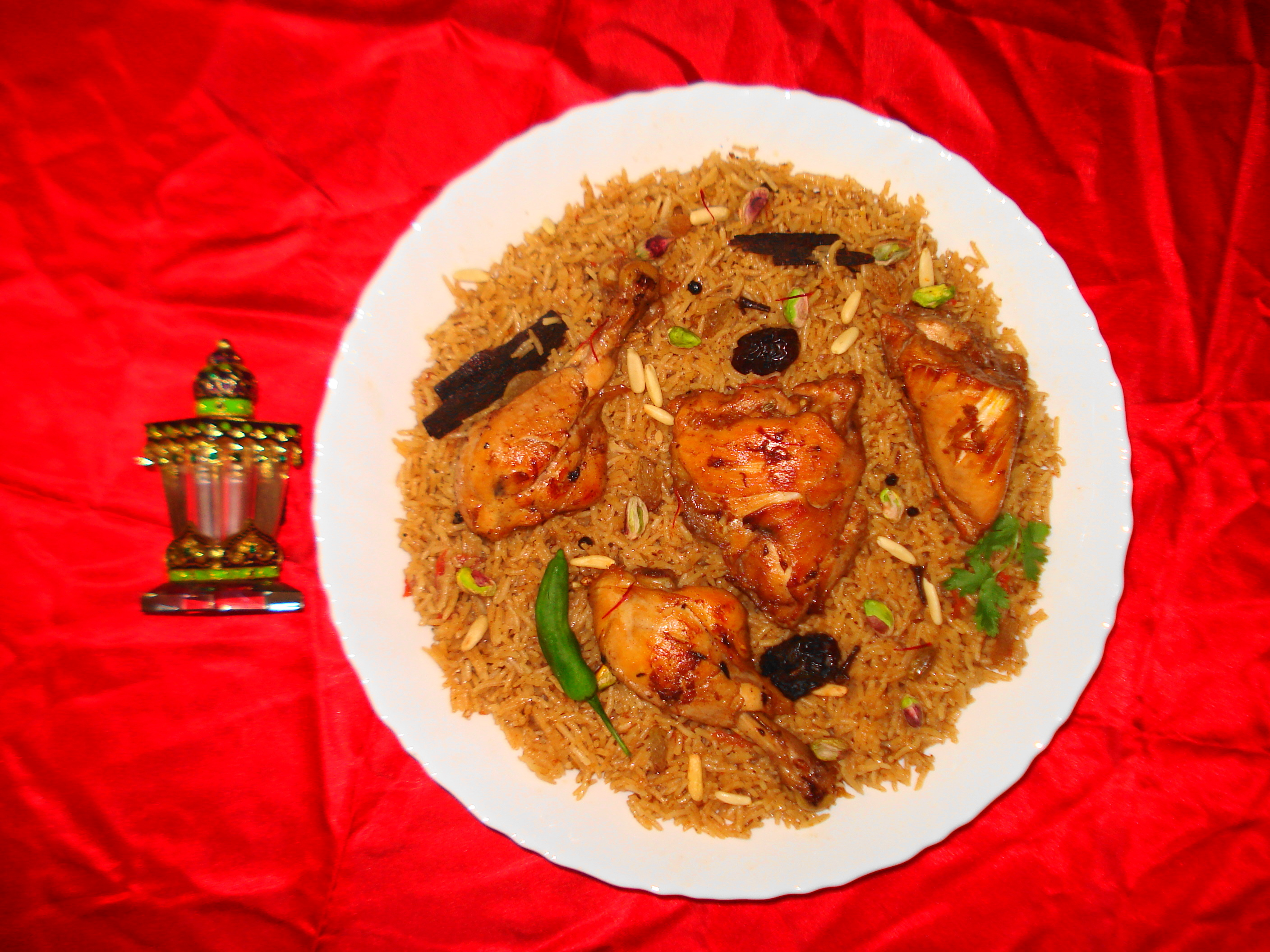
Machboos

Kuwaiti cuisine is a fusion of Arabian, Iranian, and Mesopotamian cuisines. Kuwaiti cuisine is part of the Eastern Arabian cuisine. A prominent dish in Kuwaiti cuisine is machboos, a rice-based dish usually prepared with basmati rice seasoned with spices, and chicken or mutton.

Seafood is a significant part of the Kuwaiti diet, especially fish. Mutabbaq samak is a national dish in Kuwait. Other local favourites are hamour (grouper), which is typically served grilled, fried, or with biryani rice because of its texture and taste; safi (rabbitfish); maid (mulletfish); and sobaity (sea bream).

Kuwait's traditional flatbread is called khubz. It is a large flatbread baked in a special oven and it is often topped with sesame seeds. Numerous local bakeries dot the country; the bakers are mainly Iranians (hence the name of the bread, "Iranian khubuz").

== Sport ==
Football is the most popular sport in Kuwait. The Kuwait Football Association (KFA) is the governing body of football in Kuwait. The KFA organises the men's, women's, and futsal national teams. The Kuwaiti Premier League is the top league of Kuwaiti football, featuring fifteen teams. They have been the champions of the 1980 AFC Asian Cup, runners-up of the 1976 AFC Asian Cup, and have taken third place of the 1984 AFC Asian Cup. Kuwait has also been to one FIFA World Cup, in 1982, but tied 1–1 with Czechoslovakia on the first round. Kuwait is home to many football clubs including Al-Arabi, Al-Fahaheel, Al-Jahra, Al-Kuwait, Al-Naser, Al-Salmiya, Al-Shabab, Al Qadsia, Al-Yarmouk, Kazma, Khaitan, Sulaibikhat, Sahel, and Tadamon. The biggest football rivalry in Kuwait is between Al-Arabi and Al Qadsia.

Basketball is one of the country's most popular sports. The Kuwait national basketball team is governed by the Kuwait Basketball Association (KBA). Kuwait made its international debut in 1959. The national team has been to the FIBA Asian Championship in basketball eleven times. The Kuwaiti Division I Basketball League is the highest professional basketball league in Kuwait. Cricket in Kuwait is governed by the Kuwait Cricket Association. Other growing sports include rugby union.

The Kuwait men's national handball team is controlled by the Kuwait Handball Association. Kuwait has achieved handball success at both the national and club level. The sport is widely considered to be the national icon of Kuwait, although football is more popular among the overall population. Kuwait is also the founding member of the Asian Handball Federation, the Asian Championship and Club Champions League.

Hockey in Kuwait is governed by the Kuwait Ice Hockey Association. Kuwait first joined the International Ice Hockey Federation in 1985, but was expelled in 1992 due to a lack of ice hockey activity. Kuwait was re-admitted into the IIHF in May 2009. In 2015, Kuwait won the IIHF Challenge Cup of Asia.

== Social ==
Kuwaiti society is markedly more open than other Gulf Arab societies. Kuwaiti citizens are ethnically diverse, consisting of both Arabs and Persians ('Ajam). Kuwait stands out in the region as the most liberal in empowering women in the public sphere. Kuwaiti women outnumber men in the workforce. Kuwaiti political scientist Ghanim Alnajjar sees these qualities as a manifestation of Kuwaiti society as a whole, whereby in the Gulf Arab region it is "the least strict about traditions".

=== Dewaniya ===
The Dewaniya has existed in Kuwait since time immemorial. In the old city of Kuwait it was the reception area where a man received his business colleagues and male guests. Today the term refers both to a reception hall and the gathering held in it, and visiting or hosting a dewaniya is an indispensable feature of a Kuwaiti man's social life. Dewaniya became a fundamental part of Kuwaiti life. Hence, it has become a mark in their traditional daily life.

=== Gargee'an ===
Qarqe'an is an annual celebration, observed in Kuwait, that takes place between the 13th and 15th nights of Ramadan. Gergee'an is marked with children dressing in traditional attire and going door-to-door to receive sweets from neighbours, whilst also singing traditional songs. The tradition has existed for hundreds of years and deeply rooted in Kuwaiti culture.

Although the celebration of Qarqe'an shares superficial similarities with the Halloween custom of trick-or-treating, practiced in some western countries, Qarqe'an has no connection with horror and no associated origin with Halloween.

== Media ==
Kuwait produces more newspapers and magazines per capita than its neighbors. The state-owned Kuwait News Agency (KUNA) is the largest media house in the country. The Ministry of Information regulates the media industry in Kuwait. Kuwait's media is annually classified as "partly free" in the Freedom of Press survey by Freedom House. Since 2005, Kuwait has frequently earned the highest ranking of all Arab countries in the annual Press Freedom Index by Reporters Without Borders. In 2009, 2011, 2013 and 2014, Kuwait surpassed Israel as the country with the greatest press freedom in the Middle East. Kuwait is also frequently ranked as the Arab country with the greatest press freedom in Freedom House's annual Freedom of Press survey.

Kuwait has 15 satellite television channels, of which four are controlled by the Ministry of Information. State-owned Kuwait Television (KTV) offered first colored broadcast in 1974 and operates five television channels. Government-funded Radio Kuwait also offers daily informative programming in several languages including Arabic, Persian, Urdu, and English on the AM and SW.

== See also ==
- Sawt
- Samri
- Fijiri
- Liwa
- Fann at-Tanbura
- Khaleegy
- Arab Capital of Culture
