= Middle Eastern music =

The musical traditions of the Middle East include those of the Arabic-speaking countries, the traditional Persian ritual music, the Jewish music of Israel and the diaspora, Kurdish music, Armenian music, Azerbaijani music, Georgian music, the varied traditions of Cypriot music, Turkish music, traditional Assyrian music, Coptic ritual music in Egypt as well as other genres of Egyptian music in general. It is widely regarded that some Middle Eastern musical styles have influenced Central Asia, as well as the Balkans, Southern Italy, and Spain.

Throughout the region, religion has been a common factor in uniting peoples of different languages, cultures and nations. The predominance of Islam allowed a great deal of Arabic, and Byzantine influence to spread through the region rapidly from the 7th century onward. The Arabic scale is strongly melodic, often Phrygian Dominant and based on various maqamat (sing. maqam) or modes (also known as makam in Turkish music). The early Arabs translated and developed Greek texts and works of music and mastered the musical theory of the music of ancient Greece (i.e. Systema ametabolon, enharmonium, chromatikon, diatonon). This is similar to the dastgah of Persian music. While this originates with classical music, the modal system has filtered down into folk, liturgical and even popular music, with influence from the West. Unlike much western music, Arabic music includes quarter tones halfway between notes, often through the use of stringed instruments (like the oud) or the human voice. Further distinguishing characteristics of Middle Eastern and North African music include very complex rhythmic structures, generally tense vocal tone, and a monophonic texture. Traditional Middle Eastern music does not use chords, or harmony in the Western sense.

Often, more traditional Middle-Eastern music can last from one to three hours in length, building up to anxiously awaited, and much applauded climaxes, or tarab, derived from the Arabic term طرب tarraba.

== Instruments used ==
=== Strings ===
Many instruments originate in the Middle East region. Most popular of the stringed instruments is the oud, a pear-shaped lute that traditionally had four strings, although current instruments have up to six courses consisting of one or two strings each. Legend has it that the oud was invented by Lamech, the sixth grandson of Adam. This is stated by Al-Farabi, and it is part of the Iraqi folklore relating to the instrument. Legend goes on to suggest that the first oud was inspired by the shape of his son's bleached skeleton.

Historically, the oldest pictorial record of the oud dates back to the Uruk period in Southern Mesopotamia over 5000 years ago. It is on a cylinder seal currently housed at the British Museum and acquired by Dr. Dominique Collon, Editor of Iraq at the British Institute for the Study of Iraq.

Used mostly in court music for royals and the rich, the harp also comes from ancient Egypt c. 3500 BC.

The widespread use of the oud led to many variations on the instrument, including the saz, a Turkish long-necked lute that remains very popular in Turkey.

Another popular string instrument is the qanoun, developed by Farabi during the Abbasids era. Legend has it that Farabi played qanoun in court and alternately made people laugh, cry, or fall asleep. The qanoun developed out of string instruments described in inscriptions that date to the Assyrian period. It has about 26 triple-string courses, plucked with a piece of horn. The musician has the freedom to alter the pitch of individual courses from a quarter to a whole step by adjusting metal levers.

Middle Eastern music also makes use of the violin, which is European in origin. The violin was adopted into Middle Eastern music in the 19th century, and it is able to produce non-Western scales that include quarter-tones because it is fretless.

=== Percussion ===
Percussion instruments play a very important role in Middle Eastern music. The complex rhythms of this music are often played on many simple percussion instruments. The riq الرق (a type of tambourine) and finger cymbals add a higher rhythmic line to rhythm laid down with sticks, clappers, and other drums.

An instrument native to Egypt, the darbuka (both "tabla" and "darbuka" are its names in Egyptian Arabic), is a drum made of ceramic clay, with a goatskin head glued to the body. The darbuka is used primarily in Egypt, and it has its roots in ancient Egypt. It is also used in other countries in the Middle East.

=== Winds ===
The Armenian duduk is a very popular double reeded, oboe-like instrument made out of Apricot tree wood. The Moroccan oboe, also called the rhaita, has a double-reed mouthpiece that echoes sound down its long and narrow body. A similar instrument is called the sorna. Equivalent to the mizmar and zurna, it is used more for festivals and loud celebrations. A Turkish influence comes from the mey, which has a large double reed. Bamboo reed pipes are the most common background to belly dancing and music from Egypt. Flutes are also a common woodwind instrument in ensembles. A kaval is a three-part flute that is blown in one end, whereas the ney is a long cane flute, played by blowing across the sharp edge while pursing the lips.

== International music ==
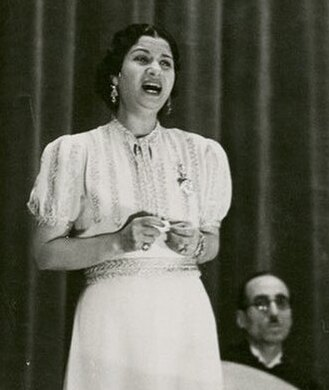
Umm Kulthum

Music pervades Middle Eastern societies. While traditional music remains popular in the Middle East, modern music reconciling Western and traditional Middle Eastern styles, pop, and fusion are rapidly advancing in popularity.

== Common genres ==
=== Geographical varieties of the music in the Arabic-speaking regions and other regions of the Middle East ===
- Algerian music
- Arabic music
- Arabic Andalusian
- Arabic Pop
- Arabic Rap
- Arabic Rock
- Arabesque music
- Armenian music
- Assyrian music
- Azerbaijani music
- Bahraini music
- Coptic music
- Cypriot music
- Dabke music
- Egyptian music
- Emirati music
- Georgian music
- Iranian music
- Iraqi music
- Israeli music
- Jordanian music
- Khaliji music
- Kurdish music
- Kuwaiti music
- Lebanese music
- Libyan music
- Mawwal
- Maghrebian music
- Mizrahi music
- Moroccan music
- Mugham
- Omani music
- Palestinian music
- Pontic Greek music
- Qatari music
- Sha'abi
- Saudi Arabian music
- Syrian music
- Tarab music
- Tunisian music
- Turkish music
- Yemeni music
- Zajal

== See also ==
- Egyptian music
- Umm Kulthum
- Popular Music
- Middle Eastern dance
