= Kuwaiti literature =

Kuwait has produced several prominent contemporary writers. There is also evidence that Kuwaiti culture has long been interactive with English and French literature. Some of the translators include Yaqoub Al-Hamad, Fathil Khalaf, poet Suleiman Al-Khulaifi, and Mahmoud Tawfeeq Ahmad who translated a number of short French plays by Molière.

== Writers ==
- Ismail Fahd Ismail (born 1940) was one of the first Kuwaiti writers to be taken seriously in the Arab world. Ismail Fahd Ismail has written over 20 novels and numerous short-story collections.
- Taleb al-Refai (born 1958) is a journalist, writer and a NCCAL employee. Each month, he produces an art magazine called Jaridat al-Funun.
- Laila al-Othman (also Laylā al-'Uthmān) (born 1943) is an author of novels and short stories. Born to a prominent Kuwaiti family, Laila al-Othman made her writing debut in a local newspaper featuring her opinion about social and literary issues.
- A. H. Almaas (A. H. Almaas is the pen name of A. Hameed Ali) (born 1944) is an author and spiritual teacher.
- Taibah Al-Ibrahim (Arabic: طِيبة أحمد الإبراهيم) is writer credited with writing the first science fiction novel in Kuwait.
- Najma Idrees (Arabic: نجمة عبدالله إدريس; born 25 December 1952) is a Kuwaiti poet, columnist and scholar.
- Fatimah Yousif al-Ali (born 1953) is a journalist and short story writer. A graduate in Arabic Literature from Cairo University, in 1971 she became the first Kuwaiti woman to write a novel.
- Hayat Alyaqout (born 1981) is a writer who founded Nashiri, the first Arabic nonprofit online publishing house, in Kuwait in 2003.
