= Asian literature =

Asian literature is the literature produced in Asia.

== Literature by country and group ==
- East Asian literature
  - Chinese literature
  - Hong Kong literature
  - Japanese literature
  - Korean literature
    - North Korean literature
    - South Korean literature
  - Macanese literature
  - Mongolian literature
  - Taiwanese literature
  - Tibetan literature
- Southeast Asian literature
  - Bruneian literature
  - Cambodian literature
  - Indonesian literature
  - Laotian literature
  - Malaysian literature
  - Myanmar literature
  - Philippine literature
  - Singaporean literature
  - Thai literature
  - Timorese-Leste literature
  - Vietnamese literature
- South Asian literature
  - Afghan literature
  - Assamese literature
  - Bangladeshi literature
  - Bhutanese literature
  - Gujarati literature
  - Indian literature
  - Kannada literature
  - Malayalam literature
  - Maldivian literature
  - Marathi literature
  - Nepalese literature
  - Odia literature
  - Pakistani literature
  - Pashto literature
  - Sri Lankan literature
  - Tamil literature
  - Telugu literature
- Central Asian literature
  - Kazakh literature
  - Kyrgyz literature
  - Tajik literature
  - Turkmen literature
  - Uzbek literature
  - Uyghur literature
- West Asian literature
  - Arabic literature
    - Bahraini literature
    - Emirati literature
    - Iraqi literature
    - Jordanian literature
    - Kuwaiti literature
    - Lebanese literature
    - Omani literature
    - Palestinian literature
    - Qatari literature
    - Saudi Arabian literature
    - Syrian literature
    - Yemeni literature
  - Armenian literature
  - Assyrian literature
  - Azerbaijani literature
  - Cypriot literature
  - Georgian literature
  - Iranian literature
    - Persian literature
  - Jewish literature
    - Israeli literature
  - Kurdish literature
  - Turkish literature
- North Asian literature
  - Russian literature

== Classical Chinese and Japanese literature ==
In Tang and Song dynasty China, famous poets such as Li Bai authored works of great importance. They wrote shī (Classical Chinese: 詩) poems, which have lines with equal numbers of characters, as well as cí (詞) poems with mixed line varieties. Early-Modern Japanese literature (17th–19th centuries) developed comparable innovations such as haiku, a form of Japanese poetry that evolved from the ancient hokku (Japanese language: 発句) mode. Haiku consists of three sections (all in a single vertical line in Japanese): the first and third segments each have five morae (which are not the phonological equivalent of syllables), while the second has seven. Original haiku masters included such figures as Edo period poet Matsuo Bashō (松尾芭蕉); others influenced by Bashō include Kobayashi Issa and Masaoka Shiki.

== Modern Asian literature ==
The polymath Rabindranath Tagore, a Bengali poet, dramatist, and writer who was an Indian, became in 1913 the first Asian Nobel laureate. He won his Nobel Prize in Literature for notable impact his prose works and poetic thought had on English, French, and other national literatures of Europe and the Americas. He also wrote the Indian anthem. Later, other Asian writers won Nobel Prizes in literature, including Yasunari Kawabata (Japan, 1966), and Kenzaburō Ōe (Japan, 1994). Yasunari Kawabata wrote novels and short stories distinguished by their elegant and spartan diction such as the novels Snow Country and The Master of Go.

== See also ==
- The Literature section of the article Culture of Asia
- The categories Literature by continent, Chinese literature, Japanese literature, Korean literature, Vietnamese literature and Indian literature.
- African literature
- European literature
- Oceanian literature
- Latin American literature
