= Persian music =

Persian music may refer to various types of the music of Persia/Iran or other Persian-speaking countries:

- Persian traditional music
- Persian ritual music
- Persian pop music
- Persian symphonic music
- Persian piano music

== See also ==
- Music of Iran
