= Manjur =

Manjur Aarisar may refer to:

- Manjur (instrument), a musical instrument in the Arab states of the Persian Gulf
- Manjur, India, a village in Tamil Nadu state

== See also ==
- Manjoor (disambiguation)
