= Music of Kuwait =

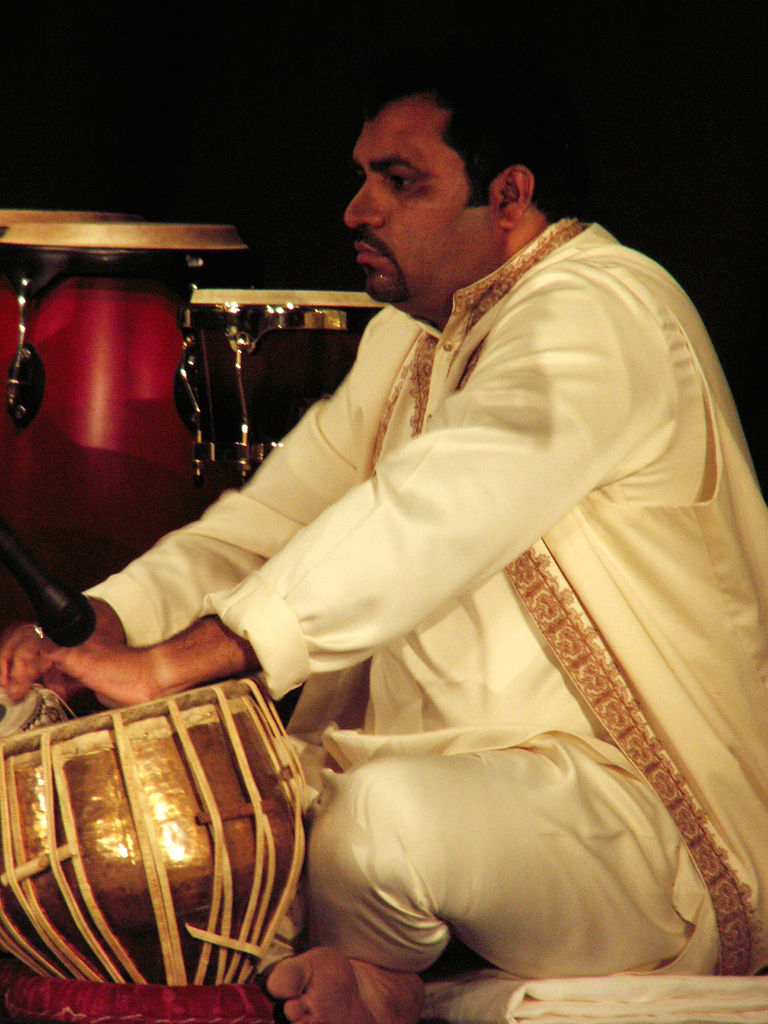
Tabla player Ustad Munawar Khan at the 8th International Music Festival in Kuwait

Kuwait is well known in the region for its exploration of many different and new forms of music and dance. Kuwait is the birthplace of various popular musical genres such as sawt. Kuwait is widely considered the centre of traditional music in the GCC region.

== History ==
Kuwait is the birthplace of various popular musical genres, such as sawt and fijiri. Traditional Kuwaiti music is derived from the country's seafaring heritage. In pre-oil times, Kuwait was regionally renowned for its music and 20–30% of Kuwaitis were professional musicians. Kuwait is widely considered the centre of traditional music in the Persian Gulf. Traditional Kuwaiti music reflects the cosmopolitan influence of many diverse cultures. The habbān is a popular Kuwaiti music instrument.

Kuwait's seafaring tradition is known for songs such as "Fidjeri". "Fidjeri" is a musical repertoire performed traditionally by male pearl divers. It involves singing, clapping, drums and dances with earthen water jars. "Liwa" and "Fann at-Tanbura" are types of music performed mainly by Kuwaitis of East African origin. "Al Arda Al Bahariya" is a well-known Kuwaiti sailor song, as are the "al-Nahma", a class of songs that accompanied many sailing activities.

Kuwait pioneered contemporary Khaliji music. Kuwaitis were the first commercial recording artists in the Persian Gulf region. The first known Kuwaiti recordings were made between 1912 and 1915. Kuwait is known as the center for "sawt", a bluesy style of music made popular in the 1970s. Saleh and Daoud Al-Kuwaity pioneered the Kuwaiti sawt music genre and wrote over 650 songs, many of which are considered traditional and still played daily on radio stations both in Kuwait and the rest of the Arab world.

Kuwait has a reputation for being the central music influence of the GCC countries. Over the last decade of satellite television stations, many Kuwaiti musicians have become household names in other Arab countries. For example, Bashar Al Shatty became famous due to Star Academy. Contemporary Kuwaiti music is popular throughout the Arab world. Nawal El Kuwaiti, Nabeel Shuail and Abdallah Al Rowaished are the most popular contemporary performers.

== Music education ==
Kuwait has academic institutions specializing in university-level music education. The Higher Institute of Musical Arts was established by the government to provide bachelor's degrees in music. In addition, the College of Basic Education offers bachelor's degrees in music education. The Institute of Musical Studies offers music education qualifications equivalent to secondary school.

== Notable landmarks ==
The Sheikh Jaber Al-Ahmad Cultural Centre contains the largest opera house in the Middle East. Kuwait is home to various music festivals, including the International Music Festival hosted by the National Council for Culture, Arts and Letters (NCCAL). The annual Gulf Music Festival features internationally renowned jazz musicians and local musicians.

== See also ==
- Arabic music
- Culture of Kuwait
- Art of Kuwait
