= Music of Oman =

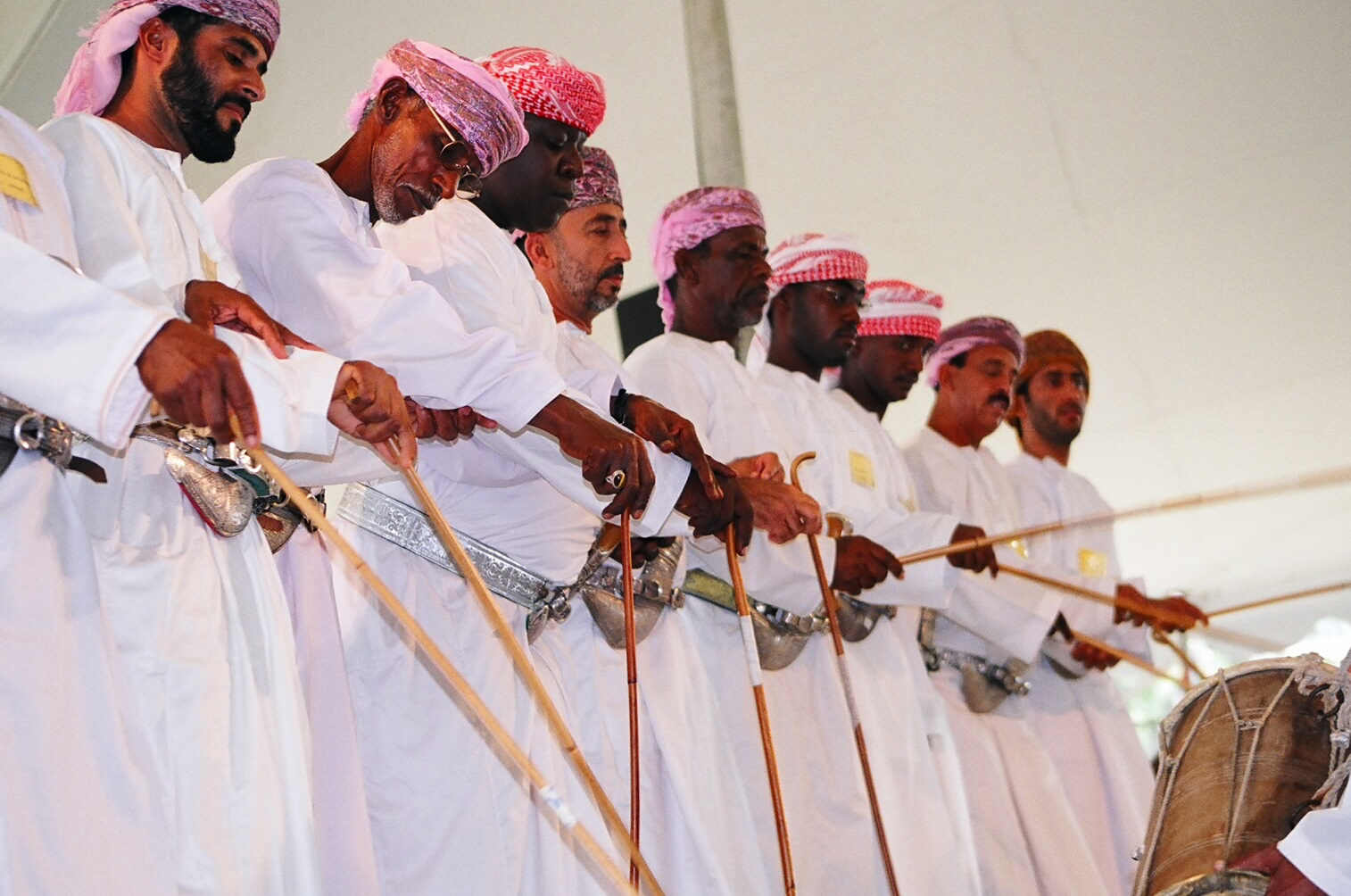
an Omani Razfa dance

The Music of Oman has been strongly affected by the country's coastal location with a diverse mix of outside influences and its own traditional Eastern, Southern Arabian, and overall Khaleeji Gulf musical tradition.

There are songs for special occasions, songs for seafarers, fishermen, Bedouins and mountain farmers. Authentic Arabic music in Oman can be characterised by ‘tetrachords’ with classic Arabic intervals, including three-quarter tones taken from the Arabic musical scales — the ‘maqamat’. Traditional songs originating from the desert are often in praise of the camel, which has been described in the Quran. Al Taghrud, sung while riding camels, and Al Taariq, a Bedouin song with two singers taking turns to sing verses, are two of the best examples of traditional desert songs.

Traditional music marks all the stages in the life of an Omani, including birth, circumcision, marriage and death. All Omanis, including men and women, and the young and the old, participate in music and celebrations.

Omani sailors' interaction with many countries like Egypt, Iran, and elsewhere, has also played a significant role in shaping the musical landscape of Oman. More recently, although not as dominant, a Portuguese occupation has left its own marks with the introduction of more European melodies. Liwa and Fann at-Tanbura are types of music and dance performed mainly in communities of descendants of Bantu peoples from the African Great Lakes region.

Notable Omani musicians include Salim Rashid Suri, the "Singing Sailor", a 20th-century singer and oud player from Sur who combined strains of the ṣawt of the northern Persian Gulf and other musical traditions of the Indian Ocean as a pioneer of the genre called Ṣawt al-Khaleej ("Voice of the Gulf").

== Dance ==
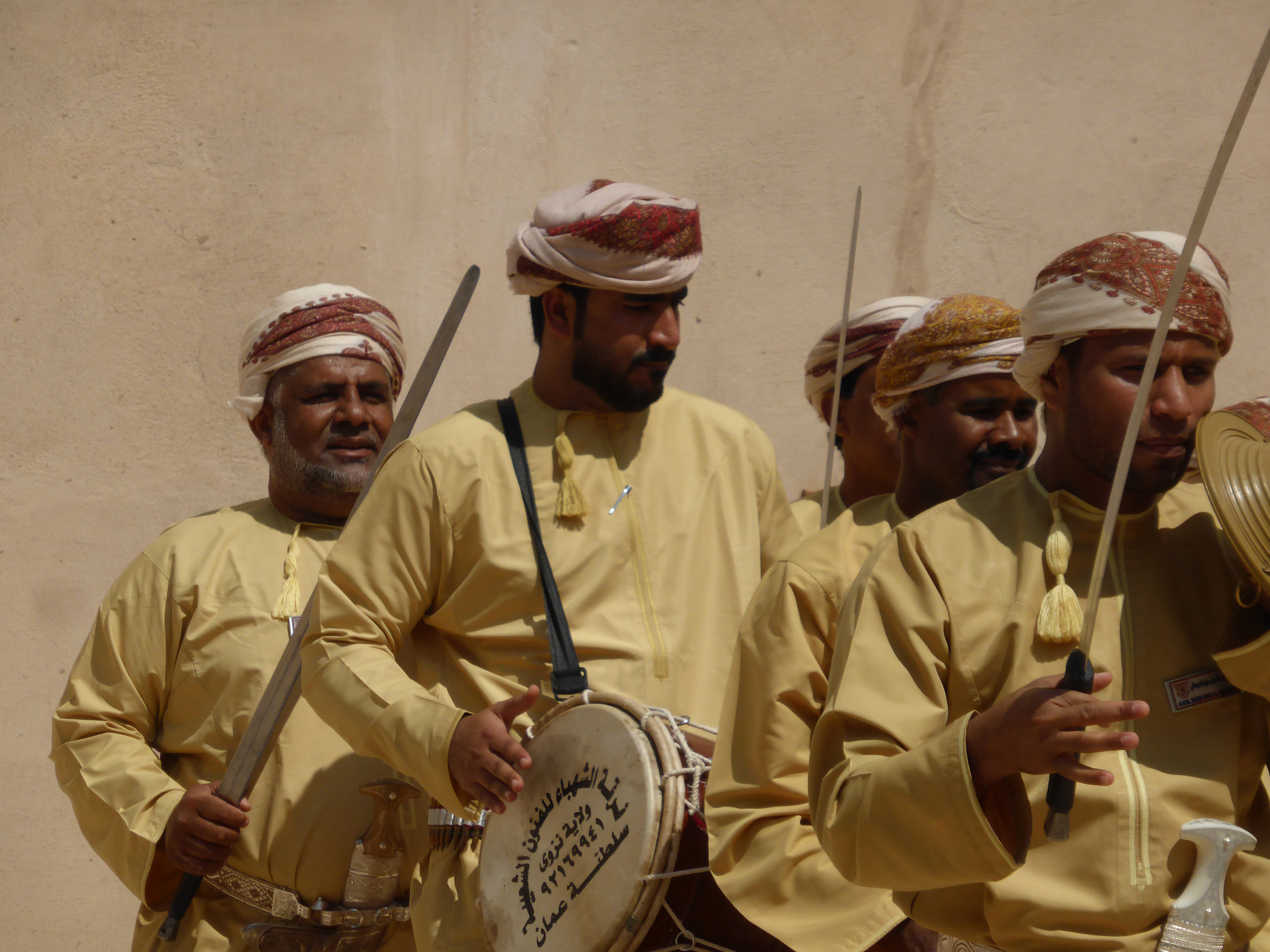
Al Razha performers at Nizwa Fort

All of Oman's traditional music is sustained by oral transmission between generations, and each region has its own unique forms.

Al-Razha is a traditional war dance characterized by its use of the sword and its exchange of poetry between men. Men leap into the air, carrying a heavy sword, and must not falter upon landing. The men also throw the sword into the air and catch it as it comes down-a show of strength and prowess. the Razha was used as a way to express the needs of the people in the tribe and also to announce war, victory, muster troops or mediate between warring factions.

Al Razfa, also known as the Yowlah, is performed by men of all ages and classes during social occasions, such as weddings and national festivals. Male performers form two facing lines with dancers filling the space between. Led by the main singer, the two rows create a dual chorus, singing chants in an anti-phonal manner to the accompaniment of drums and other instruments. Many chants are verses of traditional Nabati poetry, carefully selected to match the occasion. The dancers perform choreographed movements to the music while holding wooden replica of rifles in their hands. Sticks, also known as assa are more commonly used in place of the rifles. The music and poetry performed during the dance is referred to as Harbiya music, with Omani Harbiya groups like Abna Al Mazarie and others frequently performing at weddings, cultural festivals, national celebrations, and community gatherings.

== See also ==
- Culture of Oman
