= Omani =

Omani (ﻲﻧﺎﻣﻋ in Arabic) may refer to:

- Something of, from, or related to Oman, an Arab country in southwestern Asia
  - A person from Oman or of Omani descent, collectively referred to as Omanis; see Demographics of Oman and Culture of Oman
  - Omani Arabic (also known as Omani Hadari Arabic), a variety of Arabic spoken in the Hajar Mountains of Oman and in a few neighboring coastal regions. See also Languages of Oman
