= Mangur =

Mangur may refer to:

- Manjur (instrument)
- Mangur (tribe), one of the largest Kurdish tribes of Eastern Kurdistan
- Mangur, Afghanistan
- Mangur, India
- Mangur-e Gharbi Rural District, Iran
- Mangur-e Sharqi Rural District, Iran
- Mangur (Vikas Dada Tanawade)
