= Culture of Eastern Arabia =

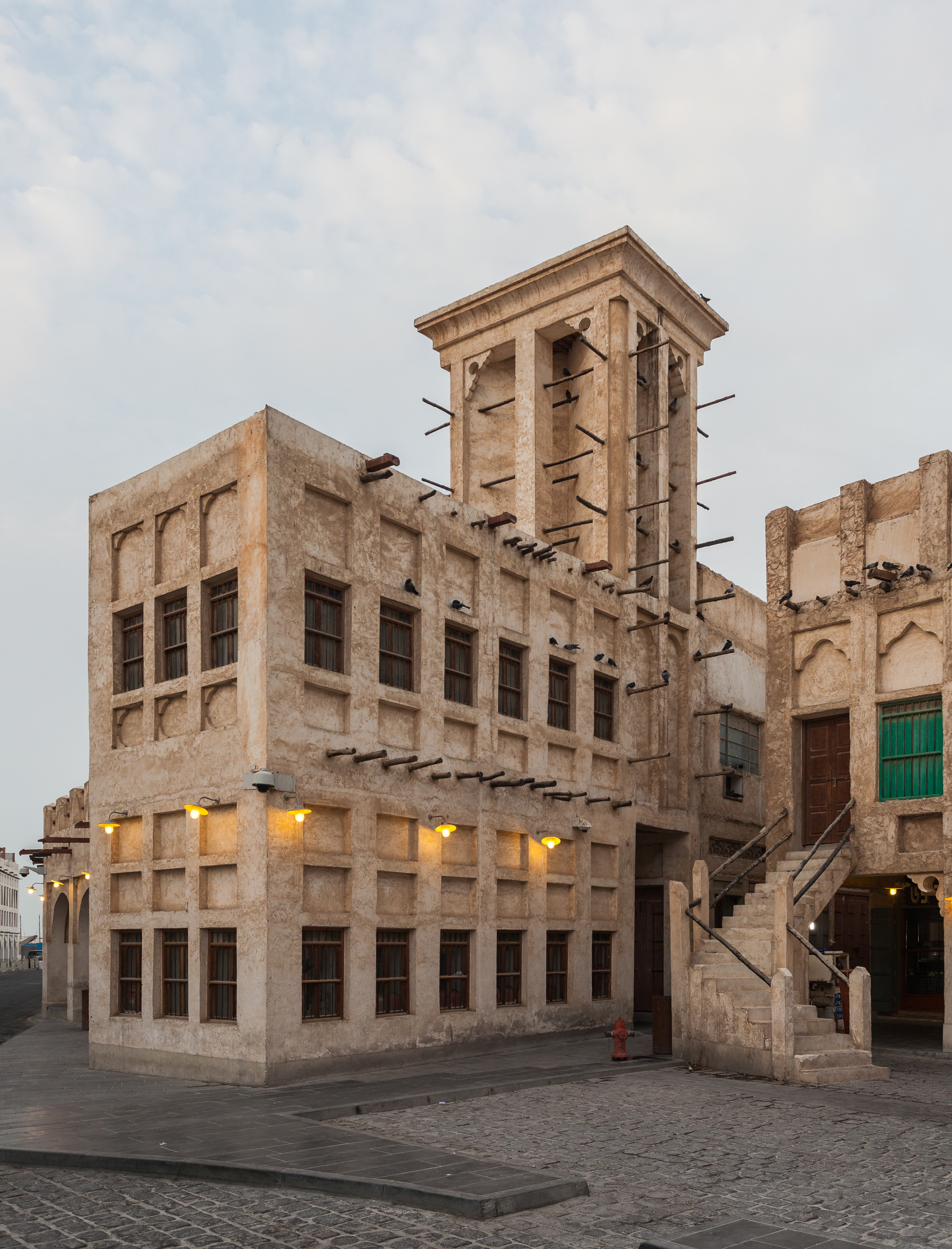
Windcatchers, called bâdgir in local dialect, in Souq Waqif, Doha

There is a rich and ancient culture in Eastern Arabia. The culture in this region has always been oriented towards the sea. The inhabitants of this area are called “Khaleeji” (meaning "of the Gulf"). It stretches from southern Iraq, to Kuwait, eastern Saudi Arabia, Bahrain, Qatar, The western United Arab Emirates and lastly northern Oman.

The semiannual tradition of Gargee'an (قرقيعان) is deeply rooted in Gulf culture. The Eastern Arabian cuisine includes seafood (including mahyawa), harees, khubz and biryani. Other cultural features of the region include windcatchers and dewaniya (or majlis).

== Overview ==
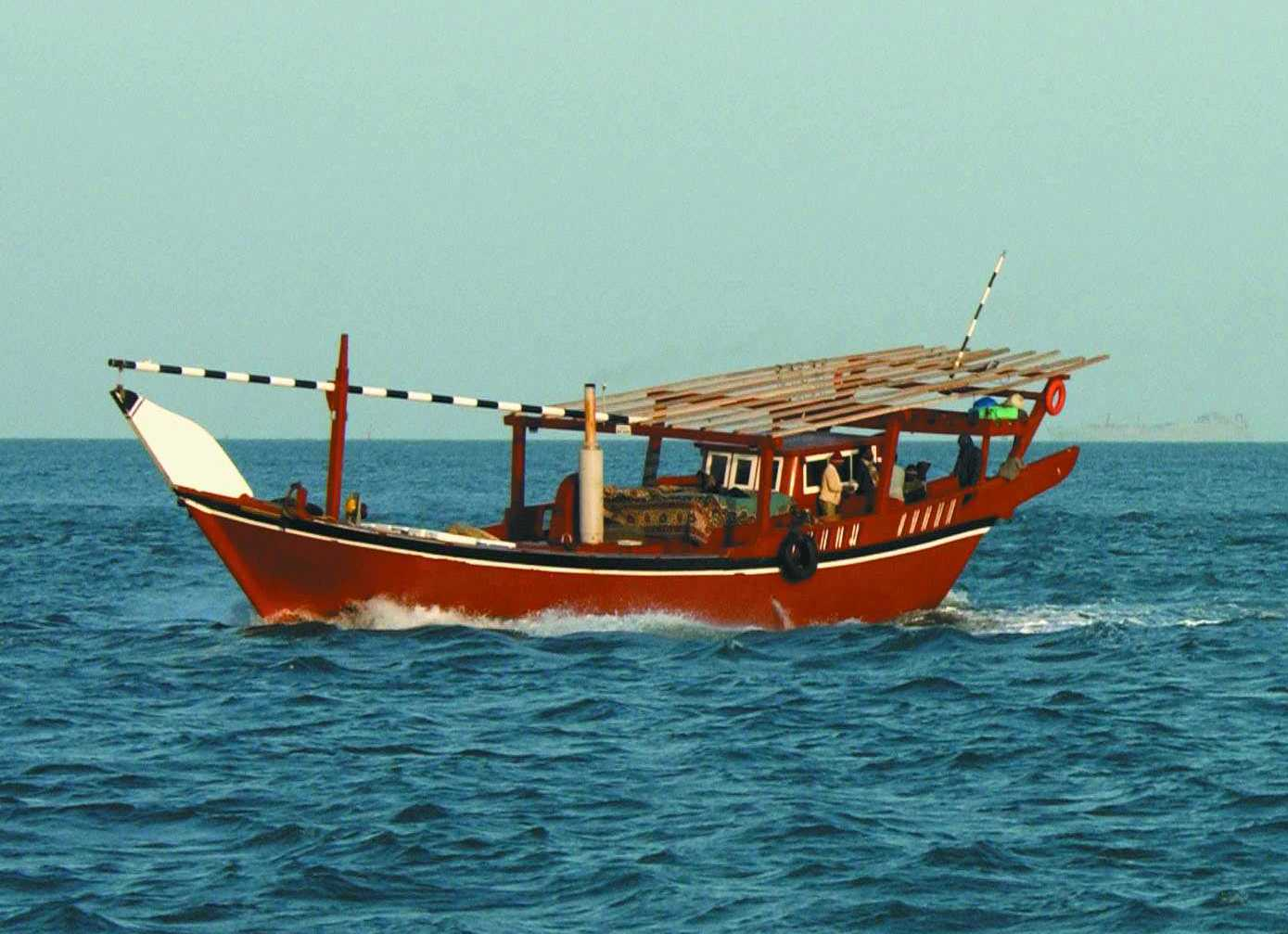
A dhow, a common item depicting the culture of seafaring in Eastern Arabia. It is displayed in the coat of arms of Kuwait and Qatar.

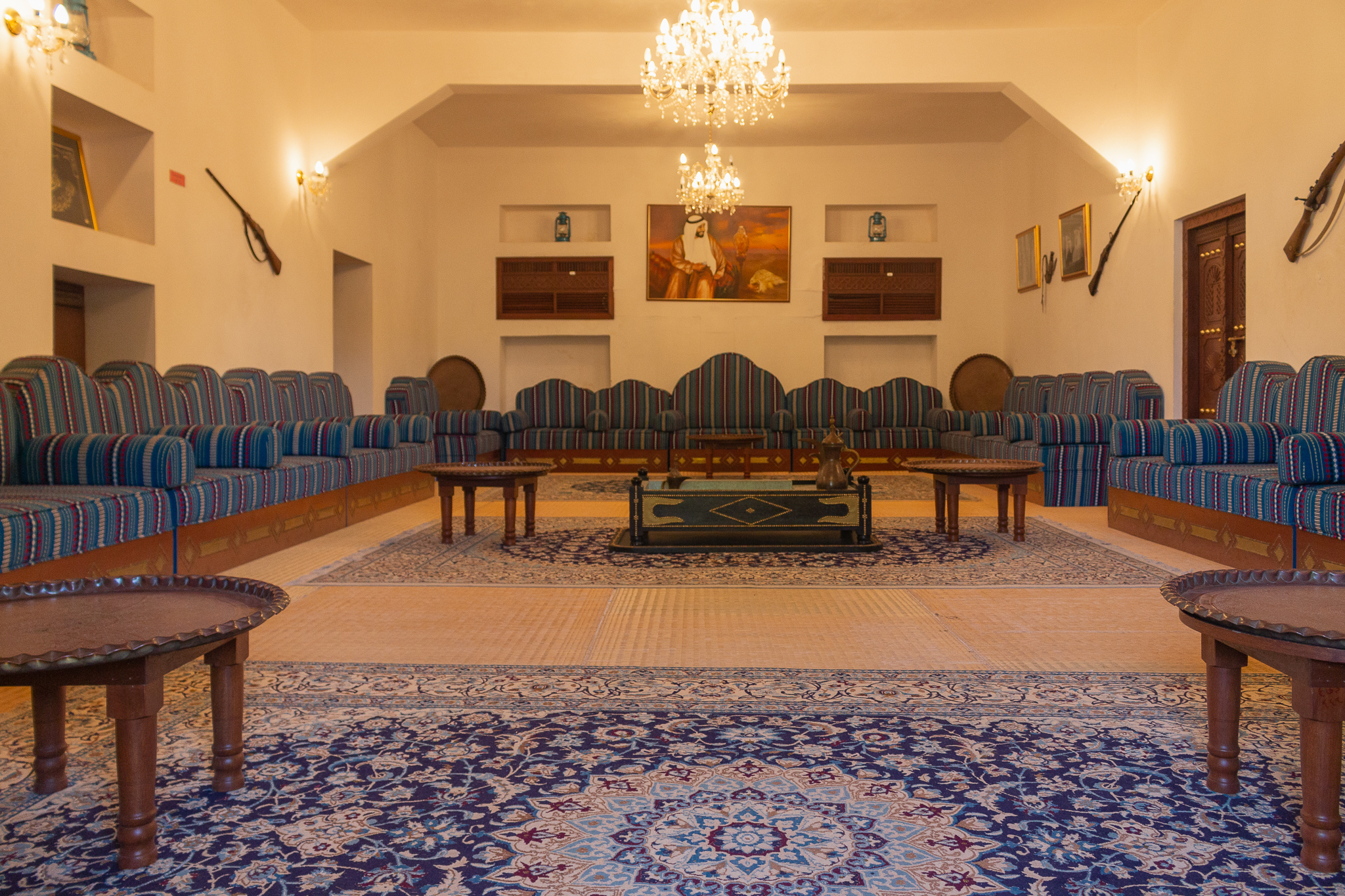
A Majlis in the United Arab Emirates. Majlis forms the unit of social gathering in Arab culture.

Cultures in the region include those of Bahrain, southern Iraq, Kuwait, UAE, Eastern Saudi Arabia (Qatif and Al-Hasa), Qatar, and Northern Oman.

== Gargee'an ==
Gargee'an (also known as Qarqe'an and Garangao depending on the country) is a semiannual celebration, observed in Eastern Arabia, that takes place on the 15th night of Sha'ban and on the 15th night of Ramadan. Gargee'an is marked with children dressing in traditional attire and going door-to-door to receive sweets from neighbours, whilst also singing traditional songs. The tradition has existed for hundreds of years and is deeply rooted in Gulf culture.

Although the celebration of Gargee'an shares superficial similarities with the Halloween custom of trick-or-treating, practiced in some western countries, Gargee'an has no known common origins with Halloween, nor does it share its macabre characteristics.

== Music ==
A variety of music and dance forms are practised in the region, including fijiri, fann at-tanbura, sawt, contemporary khaliji music, yowlah and liwa.

Musical instruments

Traditional instruments include the oud, along with a variety of drums and the manjur. The tanbūra lyre is also used.

== Languages ==
A number of different dialects of Arabic are spoken in the region, including Gulf Arabic and Bahrani Arabic. The Lurs language of Kumzari is also spoken by Omani people of Musandam Peninsula. Kumzari is the only Iranian language native to the Arab world.

== Cuisine ==
Due to the seafaring nature of the Arabs along the Eastern Arabian coast, seafood forms the major part of the cuisine of the region. Camel meat and milk also form a basic staple for all the population, most prominently for bedouins who commonly used to breed and sell camels to the rest of the population. Dates are usually consumed as snacks in between meals or offered to guests alongside Arabic coffee in the majlis. Other basic meals are rice and meat, chicken, and strained yogurt. The local Seafood diet is varied, with multiple ways to prepare fish for consumption. Squids, oysters, crabs and shrimps are all basic staple foods for the coastal Arabs. Harees is also a popular dish in the majority of eastern Arabian households.

== Dress ==
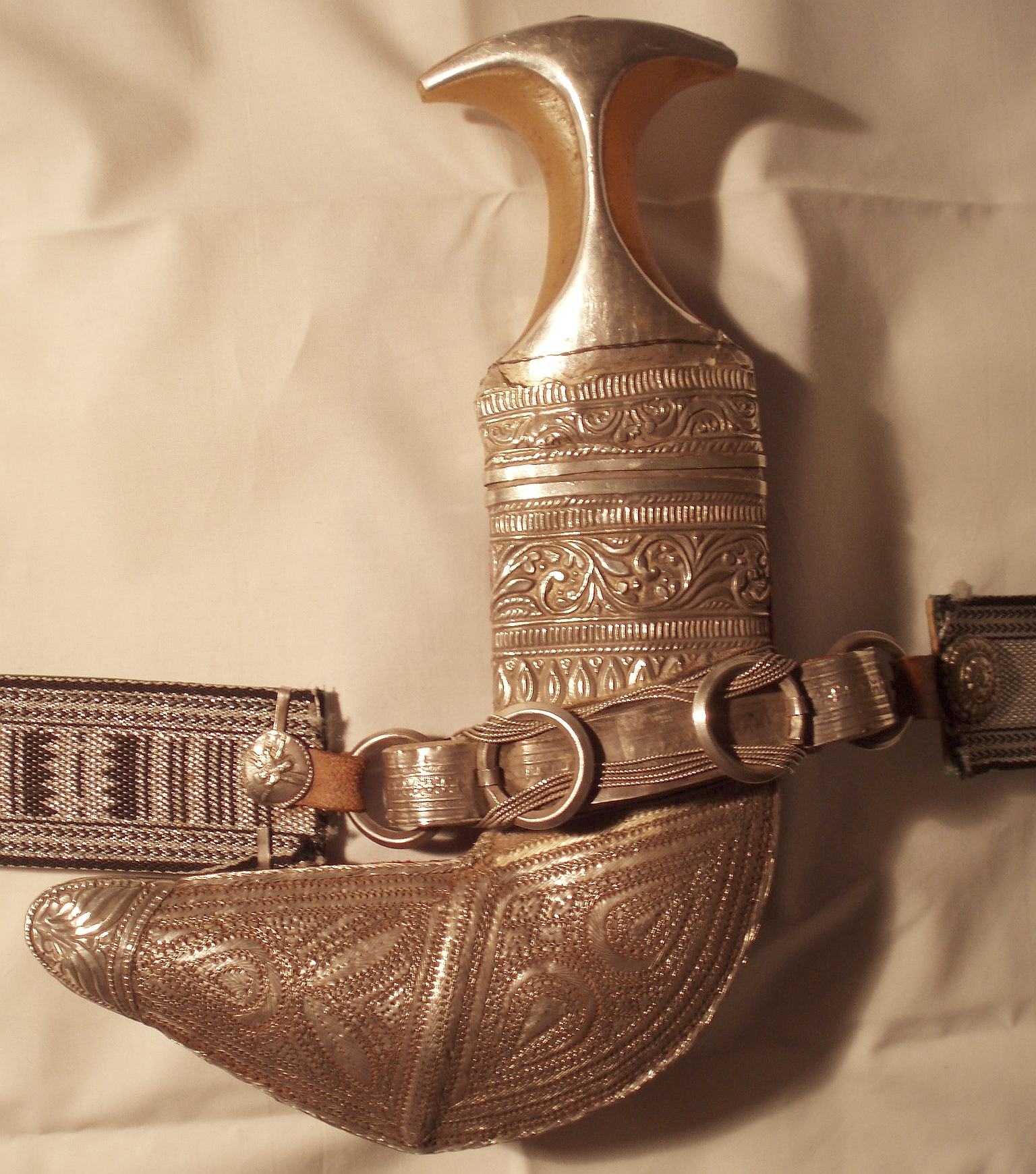
A khanjar, a commonly worn dagger in Oman (c. 1924)

The dress of the region includes a long Thobe for men, which is called a "Dishdasha" in southern Iraq, Kuwait, Bahrain and Oman, while in the United Arab Emirates it is called a "Kandoora". It is also a Bisht and Ghutra. These thobes differ in the different countries, with the collar seeing most differences between the different versions.

== Transport ==
Traditional transportation in the region includes boats such as dhows and abras.

== Other cultural features ==
Other cultural features of the region include badgeer wind towers, bukhoor and dewaniya (or majlis).

== Bibliography ==
- Madawi Al-Rasheed, ed. (2005). Transnational Connections and the Arab Gulf.
- Lawrence G. Potter, ed. (2009). The Persian Gulf in History.
- "The Gulf's Ethnic Diversity: An Evolutionary History" in Security in the Persian Gulf: Origins, Obstacles and the Search for Consensus, Edited by G. Sick and L. Potter, pp. 284.
- Lawrence G. Potter, ed. (2014). Sectarian Politics in the Gulf (PDF). Archived from the original (PDF) on 2013-04-24.
