= Bassam Almusallam =

Kuwaiti writer

- بسام المسلّم
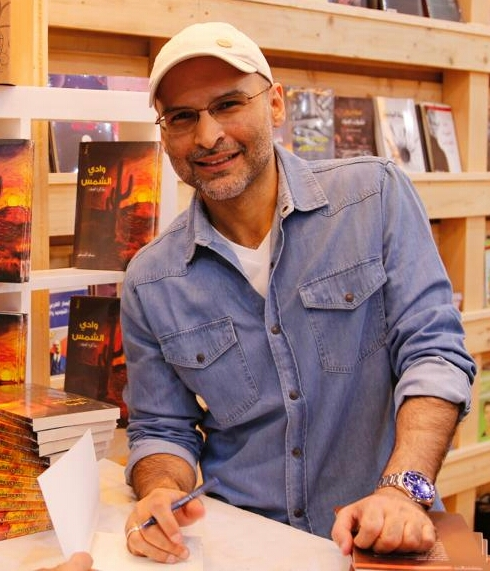
- Bassam Almusallam at Kuwait International Book Fair, November 2019
- Occupations: novelist, short story writer

Bassam Almusallam (Arabic: بسام المسلّم) is a Kuwaiti award-winning novelist, short story writer, and former assistant editor at KUNA. He has published three books including two short story collections, Under the Pigeons Tower (2010) and The Banner: Stories in The Windward (2013) which won Laila al-Othman Prize in the same year. His short story, Adham Washing Machine, won a competition organized by Al-Arabi magazine and the London-based BBC Arabic in 2012.

His debut novel, Valley of the Sun: The Phoenix Memo (2016), explores behind the scenes of the Syrian Civil War following the journey of a Kuwaiti ASU alumnus to join the Nusra Front militia fight against the Assad government between 2013 and 2014.

Syrian novelist Fawwaz Haddad lauded the novel and Kuwaiti novelist Ismail Fahd Ismail who praised it for its "boldness", describing it as "tragedy of the time/now".

The novel won the State Award for Literature in 2018, and is currently under translation to Chinese by China Intercontinental Press (CIP).
