= The Sound of Violence =

The Sound of Violence may refer to:

- The Sound of Violence (song), a 2002 song by French electronic duo Cassius
- The Sound of Violence (album), an album by Bahraini thrash metal band Motör Militia
- The Sound of Violence, a 2011 song by Onslaught from Sounds of Violence
- The Sound of Violence, a 2015 song by Parkway Drive from Ire
- The Sound of Violence, a 2018 song by Light the Torch from Revival

== See also ==
- The Sound of Silence, a song by Simon and Garfunkel
