= Wasmiyah Leaves The Sea =

1986 Kuwaiti novel

Wasmiyah Leaves The Sea (Wasmiyah Takhruju Minal Baḥri)
- Author: Lailia Al-Othman
- Language: Arabic
- Published: 1986
- Publisher: Dar Al-Mada Publishing
- Pages: 157

Wasmiyah Leaves The Sea (Wasmiyah Takhruju Minal Baḥri) is a 1986 novel by the Kuwaiti author Laila Al-Othman. The novel was adapted into a successful movie in 1996, a decade after its publication date. Additionally, it was selected among the 100 best Arabic novels.

Laila Al-Othman is known for centering women in her novels as a result of society's oppression of women at the time. Her writings led to her arrest.

== Summary ==
The novel follows an innocent love story in a coastal Kuwaiti village between Wasmiyah – who comes from a well-respected family – and Abdullah Bin Maryoumah.

Their love story begins from childhood, but after Wasmiyah becomes of age, she is made to wear the hijab and forbidden to see her childhood lover Abdullahkilled with her lover, Abdullah, but Wasmiyah never leaves the ocean as the waves carry her lifeless body away.

== Analysis ==
Wasmiyah Leaves The Sea (Wasmiyah Takhruju Minal Baḥri) is a realistic social novel, critiquing Kuwaiti culture and traditions oppressing and restricting women. The novel represents the need for modernization and shows how the discovery of oil led to economic development exclusively, and not social development, especially in regards to women's positions in society.

Laila Al-Othman depicts the patriarchy – men's ability to do things that women are forbidden to do. She also represents how a woman's worst enemy is herself, for she passes on these traditional patterns to her children. The sea was known to be a place exclusively for men, a wide open space signifying freedom. However, a woman's place is her house – a closed area signifying the confinement and lack of freedom that women have.

The novelist depicts reality as it is without sugar-coating it. Wasmiyah, the trader's daughter, falls in love with Abdullah, the usherer's son. Their love is forbidden due to classism, disabling her from marrying anyone outside her economic and social class. Society's imposed classism leads Abdullah to live in grief and pain over the loss of his lover.

The novel uses male characters to showcase women's suffering that leads to men's suffering, in Abdullah's loss of his lover.

== Criticisms ==
Laila Al-Othman's novels are known for their boldness, linguistically and plot-wise. They are also known for centering on women; therefore, some of her writings were banned due to their boldness and criticism of Kuwaiti society's traditional values.

For example, in her novel Wasmiyah Leaves The Sea (Wasmiyah Takhruju Minal Baḥri), she creates a love story contrary to Kuwaiti values.

The novel mentions religion, for the girl starts to cover her hair as is imposed traditionally, followed by her inability to leave her house after becoming of age.

Kuwaiti culture and tradition at the time force Wasmiyah to throw herself into the sea to avoid being seen by the police officer, despite her only "mistake" being meeting with her childhood friend and lover on the beach.

The novel deeply critiques Kuwaiti society and its traditions.

The novel's harsh and cynical events stem from an anger towards women's suffering in a patriarchal society.
