= Music of Bahrain =

The music of Bahrain is part of the Persian Gulf folk traditions. Alongside Kuwait, it is known for sawt music, a bluesy genre influenced by African, Indian and Persian music. Sultan Hamid, Ali Bahar and Khaled El Sheikh (a singer and oud player) are among the most popular musicians from Bahrain.

Bahrain was the site of the first Persian Gulf-based recording studio, established after World War II. Modern music institutions in Bahrain include the Bahrain Music Institute, the Bahrain Orchestra and the Classical Institute of Music. The Bahraini male-only pearl diving tradition is known for the songs called fidjeri.

Liwa and Fann at-Tanbura are types of music and dance performed mainly in communities of descendants of Bantu peoples from the African Great Lakes region.

== Khaleeji ==
Khaleeji is a style of Persian Gulf-area folk music, played in Bahrain with polyrhythms. The style is strongly influenced by the music of Africa. Khaleeji singer Ali Bahar is one of the few Bahraini pop stars to sing in a local dialect, along with his band Al Ekhwa.

== Sawt ==
In Bahrain, the early pioneers of sawt were Mohammed Faris and Dhabi bin Walid in the pre-World War II era. Both recorded their sawt music in His Master's Voice's studio in Baghdad in 1932. Their recordings became widely popular in Bahrain and Kuwait.

The Bahraini sawt style became the predominant style of sawt in the Persian Gulf region.

== Modern era ==
The band Bahraini Osiris has achieved some international renown since the 1980s with its style of progressive rock, most recently including elements of Bahraini folk music.

There is also a heavy metal and hard rock community in the country, with bands writing and performing original songs. Pioneering bands on the Island include Motör Militia, Smouldering In Forgotten and The Mushroom Massacre (members of The Mushroom Massacre went on to form Lunacyst and most recently Death Box Audio). Popular bands in the Kingdom also include MUST, The Relocators, Mo zowayed, Bloodshel and Hot Laser. A community of singer-songwriters has also been active in Bahrain, with Ala Ghawas being among the first of them in the early 2000s. There are some fusion-projects, too – oftentimes mixing influences such as Middle Eastern music tradition with rock - such as Majaz and Aalaat. There is also a small yet active electronic dance music in Bahrain with several producers/DJs, making music in the genres such as techno, house, and trance.
