= Motör Militia =

Bahraini heavy metal band

- Origin: Saar, Bahrain
- Genres: Thrash metal, Heavy metal
- Years active: 2001–Present
- Members: John Baker - Vocals; Ahmed Janahi - Guitars; Abdulla Muijrers - Drums; Hisham Alawadhi - Guitars; Mohammed Alkhuzaie - Bass
- Past members: Mahmood Abdulla - Vocals/Bass; Yousef Hatlani - Guitars; Salem Sulaibikh - Guitars; Ahmed Abualkhair - Guitars; Abdulrazaq Awadh - Bass

Motör Militia (also known as Motor Militia) is a Bahraini heavy metal band. They are regarded as one of the first heavy metal bands in the Persian Gulf and Middle East area to record and release a full-length album of original material on an independent label.

In 2003, Motör Militia built a following based on word of mouth promotion in their local and neighboring Middle Eastern music communities. At the same time, members of the group began interacting with many other bands in their local heavy metal scene, organizing DIY heavy metal and hard rock concerts at a pace faster than previously realized. This, in addition to the band's decision to play sets consisting almost entirely of original material (and subsequently recording and releasing it), influenced many local groups to do the same.

Popular for their atypical cover song selections, live shows, and original compositions, the band remains well known in Middle Eastern heavy metal and hard rock music communities.

== Biography ==
Formed in 2001 by school mates Motör Militia is regarded as one of the first metal bands in the Persian Gulf region and Middle East to record and release a full-length album of original material on an independent label. In 2003 Motör Militia built a following based on word of mouth promotion in their local and neighboring Middle Eastern music communities.

Members of the group also began interacting with many other bands in their local heavy metal scene, organizing DIY heavy metal and hard rock concerts at a pace faster than previously realized. This, in addition to the band's decision to play sets consisting almost entirely of original material (and subsequently recording and releasing it), influenced many local groups to do the same.

The first FVF Music Festival was organized by Motör Militia on October 23, 2003, attracting a crowd of over 1,000 concertgoers.

In the spring of 2004 while riding the wave of momentum that had been created the band was signed by the Saudi based independent label “SandStorms Records” to record and release an album of original material. 'The Sound of Violence' was released in June that year and launched at the final FVF show.

In 2007, the band regrouped with a new lineup and continued where they left off. As a result of their resurgence they aided in the resurrection of the Bahraini live metal scene, which had almost disappeared in their absence. In 2010, the band independently recorded the album “Cloaked in Darkness."

After the album's release in 2011, the band hit the road notably headlining the Dorrak Festival in Bahrain, performing twice in Dubai and at the Deccan Rock Festival in Hyderabad, India along with death metal act Decapitated. Returning to Bahrain, the band closed out 2011 with an appearance at the annual Bud Battle of the Bands; an event traditionally reserved for hotel based cover bands. By being allowed to participate for the first time, the band took the event by storm, leaving a lasting impression.

The release party for "Cloaked in Darkness" in 2011 was recorded by Studio 77 and subsequently released in 2012 as a split live DVD entitled "Resurrection: The Bahrain Underground Vol. 1."

The band continued performing live, opening for Nervecell's second Bahrain performance in 2012 and playing at the 2013 Bahrain National Day Festival at the Bahrain International Circuit in front of a national audience.

== Members ==
=== Current members ===
- John Baker – vocals (2016 – present)
- Hisham Alawadhi – guitars (2007 – present)
- Ahmed Janahi – guitars (2014 – present)
- Mohammed Alkhuzaie – bass (2017–present)
- Abdulla Muijrers – drums (2001 – present)

=== Former members ===
- Mahmood Abdulla – vocals, bass (2001-2015)
- Yousef Hatlani – guitars (2003-2005)
- Ahmed Abualkhair – guitars (2008-2013)
- Salem Sulaibeekh – guitars (2003-2004)
- Abdulrazaq Awadh – bass (2007-2016)

== Discography ==
- The Sound of Violence (2004)
- Cloaked in Darkness (2011)
- Resurrection: Bahrain Underground Vol. 1 (2012)
- World in Flames (2018)
- Metal! Live In Bahrain Vol. 1 (2019)
