= Manjoor =

Manjoor can refer to:

- Manjur (instrument), a musical instrument in the Arab States of the Persian Gulf
- Manjoor (village), a village in Kottayam district, Kerala, India
