= Iranian Piano =

Iranian piano (Persian piano or Persian tuned piano) refers to the techniques for tuning, playing and composing for the piano which were developed by Iranian musicians in the nineteenth and twentieth centuries. Persian piano music (Persian: موسیقی ایرانی برای پیانو) refers to piano pieces that are based on Persian traditional music or to pieces by Persian (Iranian) composers for the piano.

== History ==
The first piano arrived to Iran in 1805, in a cargo of gifts, which also included portraits, furniture and clocks, sent to the Persian Shah, Fath Ali Shah Qajar by Napoleon Bonaparte. It did not receive attention as a proper instrument by the Iranian musicians at that time, and it was treated as a decorative object, placed at the corner of a hall in Golestan palace, and forgotten. In 1866, a French company started selling pianos in Tehran, and this gradually increased the popularity of the instrument among Iranians. At that time, one of the courtiers asked the renowned musician, Sarvar-ol-Molk, to go to his house and examine his newly purchased piano. Sarvar-ol-Molk, who was a master Santoor player, found out that piano is similar to Santoor and uses the same logic. He tuned the instrument based on the quadritone system of Dastgahs so that Persian songs could be played on it.

Thrilled by Savar-ol-Molk's discovery, Princess Esmat-od-Dowleh decided to learn the instrument. As it was inappropriate for an aristocratic women to be taught music by a man, she sent her black bondwoman to learn it from him, and each session bondwoman transferred to her what she had learned that day. The second person to learn the instrument was Prince Azod-od-Dowleh, the son of the deceased king Fat'h Ali Shah, who was then 47. Towards the end of the nineteenth century an Iranian form of playing the piano was formed. In this style left hand mainly played the octaves, bases or simply doubles the voice of the right hand. It also found its own innovative types of tunes, namely Rast-Kook and Chap-kook, which made the instrument compatible with the traditional Persian scales.

== Lemaire ==
Alfred Jean Baptiste Lemaire (1842-1907), then the Director of Music in the Persian army, was the first to compose Persian music for piano based on the classical European rules. He drew upon the Iranian approach and added Classical composing methods of harmonisation and variation, that broke free from the strict Persian style. This integration sounded uncanny and unauthentic to some Iranian musicians and in their works they had tried to stay away from this blended style. Lemaire's book, titled Avaz et Tasnif Persans, covered four of Dastgahs. It was published in Paris and was enthusiastically received in Europe.

Throughout the twentieth century liano became more integrated with the classical Persian music and appeared in the ensemble playing, accompanying Sehtar, Tombak and Kamanche. The key musicians of the Iranian piano at this period were Motamed-ol-Molk Yahya'ian, Moshir-Homayoun Shahrdar, Morteza Mahjubi and Javad Maroufi. Mahjubi and Maroufi brought about the most significant changes in Iranian piano style and each developed their own techniques, the style of former being recognised more as classical and the latter as modern and hybrid.

== Mahjubi ==
Morteza Mahjubi (1900-1965), in addition to being a composer and player, was a great piano tuner as well. He always had his tuning hammer to change the tuning of a piano or fine tune it during a recording session or prior to a performance. His approach offered an equivalent for the timbre and preformative qualities of traditional instruments, including Santoor and Sehtar. He developed a new method for the use of piano pedals and translated the Persian music ornamental motifs for the piano.

Mahjubi used the Reez technique - which is a common technique among Tar players, meaning a fast repetition of a note - but has modified it by playing on two intervals, most commonly the third and eight intervals, instead of on a single note. The trill sound produced creates a similar impression to the sound of Persian string instrument and can easily accompany and respond to a vocalist.

His other invention is the Persian Ambience, which is produced when a note is played with a single rapid alternation of the note above.This method is known in the Persian music as Dorrab. He also achieved a sound quality similar to Tahrir - which a "sobbing" kind of vocal embellishment - through the use of ascending or descending arrays of trills. His other technique, named Eshareh Ve Tekeih, is literally translated as "lean and pointing", was also commonly used before, especially in Avaz and Santoor. He also integrated the technique of Khafeh Kardan, which in Western music is known as Damping, to piano by applying a very subtle damper pedal.

Mahjubi developed new notation. He never used the Modern European notation but instead used his self-invented method, which was writing the name of the notes in Persian alphabet, without the use of staff. The duration of the notes was also not indicated and had to be learned by memorising the rhythm. He used an extended set of symbols to emphasise different dynamics and articulations.

For example, he used the plus symbol + to indicate a musical rest, brackets ( ) to point out a complete repetition of the whole measure and the letter "b" to show that the note should be played on Black key. This notations was registered as a National Cultural Heritage of Iran (UNESCO) in 2013 by Pooyan Azadeh.

Mahjubi was able to tune the piano both on Chap-kook and Rast-kook, but normally he switched between an array of different tunings in a performance, based on the Dastgah he would play in. According to Esamil Navab Safa, Mahjubi's performance style was improvisational, and he never planned or prepared for his performances, and if he played a piece ten times he would play it differently each time.

Mahjubi taught several students, including Princess Azarmidokht Malek-Mansoor, Mrs. Fakhri Malekpour and Mrs. Turandokht Sane'i. His most notable pupil is Fakhri Malekpour, who was trained under Mahjubi for twelve years and who dedicated her life to passing down the method of his teacher to the younger generation. She teaches young children, performs music and publishes CDs and books. Being solely motivated by her love of music, she never asks for money in return.

== Maroufi ==
Javad Maroufi (1912-1993) and his parents were both renowned musicians. He was born into the family of the former Prime Minister Mirza Ali Asghar Khan Amin al-Soltan. Maroufi's style differs from Mahjubi, in that Maroufi was interested in the music of modernism, particularly the works of Debussy and Ravel, which inspired him. He wrote his harmony lines based on the Western standards, while achieving a Persian mood at the same time. As such, his compositions are a balance which are neither too Western classical nor too "foreign" -sounding" for the Western listener. His left hand chords include minor, major, diminished, dominant sevenths and rarely dominant ninth chords.

His harmonies are colourful and various in form, as he uses different types of arpeggios. His famous arpeggio consists of four notes with quavers as the beginning and the end note, and two semiquaver at the middle, while the more complicated ones incorporate trills or triplets. He used the simple chord progression and never altered modulation or secondary dominants. His most often applied chord is I---III---V---I.

His melodic lines follow the classical rules of Variation. He does not use complex variations, and does not think of variation as a goal within itself; rather he employs a simple alterations of the melody line to create a more pleasant mood. Unlike Mahjubi, he adopted modern Western notation.

Maroufi was a great teacher as well, and has trained numerous musicians who used and developed his style up until the present.
