= Maldivian literature =

The first evidence of Maldivian literature is known as Lōmāfānu (copper-plate grants) from the 12th century. Lōmāfānu is in the oldest known written form of Maldivian.

== Starting of modern era ==
Husain Salaahuddheen wrote Siyarathunnabaviyyaa. Addu Bandeyri Hasan Manikufaan wrote Dhiyoage Raivaru. Other poets include Assayyidhu Bodufenvalhugey Seedhee (Bodufenvalhuge Sidi).

== Maldivian authors ==
- H. Salahuddin
- Bodufenvalhuge Sidi
- Saikuraa Ibrahim Naeem
- Ibrahim Shihab
- Mohamed Amin Didi
