= The Sound of Violence (album) =

Studio album by Motör Militia
- Released: July 22, 2004
- Recorded: June – July 2004 at Hilwan Studios in Salmabad, Bahrain
- Genre: Thrash metal heavy metal
- Length: 37:14
- Label: SandStorms Records
- Producer: Abdulla Muijrers, Waleed Suwaimel

Motör Militia chronology
The Sound of Violence (2004)	The Dark Reign (2005)

Professional ratings
Review scores
Source	Rating
JorZine	4/5 stars

The Sound of Violence is Bahraini thrash metal band Motör Militia's debut album, and is the first album of its genre to be released by a Middle Eastern group on an independent label.

Influenced stylistically by 1980s thrash metal, particularly Slayer and Metallica, the album was recorded in Salmabad, Bahrain—an industrial district more akin to forging steel than to recording studios. Regardless, the band recorded eight songs between June and July 2004.

Taking the DIY ethic to heart, the band put together fifty CD packages by hand—with their record company providing the cases and other components. They were all subsequently sold at Friendly Violent Fun 3, another DIY concert organized by members of the band, as well as other bands in the Bahraini heavy metal music community.

== Track listing ==
1. "End of Days" – 04:04
  (Music: Abdulla - Lyrics: Abdulla / Muijrers)
2. "Ignorance" – 03:55
  (Music & Lyrics: Abdulla)
3. "Fame. Fortune. Flesh." – 04:44
  (Music: Hatlani / Abdulla - Lyrics: Abdulla)
4. "Shattered Dream" – 03:59
  (Music: Abdulla / Hatlani - Lyrics: Abdulla)
5. "Hole" – 05:29
  (Music: Abdulla / Muijrers / Hatlani - Lyrics: Abdulla / Muijrers)
6. "Wrath of Violence" – 04:34
  (Music & Lyrics: Abdulla)
7. "Sins of Man" – 04:34
  (Music: Hatlani - Lyrics: Abdulla)
8. "Nuclear Winter" – 05:52
  (Music: Hatlani - Lyrics: Muijrers)

== Personnel ==
- Mahmood Abdulla – vocals, Bass
- Yousef Hatlani – guitars
- Abdulla Muijrers – drums
