= Salem Allan =

Bahraini singer (1914–1981)

Salem Allan سالم العلان

Background information
- Born: 1914; Galali, Bahrain
- Died: 25 September 1981 (aged 67)
- Genres: Fijiri

Salem al-Allan (Arabic: سالم العلان; 1914 – 25 September 1981) was a Bahraini Fijiri singer. He was born in Galali, a village in the Muharraq Governorate.

== Biography ==
Allan was born in the village of Galali in the Muharraq Governorate in 1914, the second son of his father Niham and a mother from the same neighborhood and brother of the eldest, Ashour. Educated in local schools, he lost his father at the age of four when the latter died before receiving the advance (tasqam) paid to prepare the family for his departure to go pearl hunting. The captain (nokhatha), an influential figure in nearby Qatar, demanded Ashour and Salem go in their father's place, and after a few months in his aunt's custody he returned to the hard life of a pearl diver.

He recorded many broadcasts for Bahrain Radio and Television Corporation as part of an initiative by Undersecretary of Information to preserve folk art. He also often recorded and broadcast in Qatar and Kuwait. In 1975, he acted in the play Top Top Ya Bar (توب توب يا بحر) with the Al-Jazirah Theatre, written by Rashid al-Ma'awda and directed by Saad al-Jazzaf. In 1978, he traveled with the Bahrain National Heritage Center to Paris to record a special cylinder of Fijiri songs for UNESCO. He sang with Ahmed Jassim Boutabnieh at an evening gala praised in French newspapers including the well-illustrated feature in Le Figaro, where vocal coaches marveled at his technique. The Heritage Center, then led by Al-Ma’awda and Ahmed al-Fardan, brought him with their touring delegation to such venues as the International Festival of Carthage in Tunisia and others in France, Germany, and Australia. His art was also honored by the Kuwait Minister of Information. In retirement, he stayed at retreats such as the Marzouq bin Aman House in his native Galali (now named after him), the Hamad bin Hussein House in Kuwait, and the Mubarak bin Saeed House in Qatar. He died at the age of 67 on 25 September 1981.

== Discography ==
- Bahrain: Fidjeri-Songs Of The Pearl Divers - Dar Jnah Men's Choir
