= Saleh and Daoud Al-Kuwaity =

Musical artists

Saleh and Daoud Al-Kuwaity صالح و داوود الكويتي
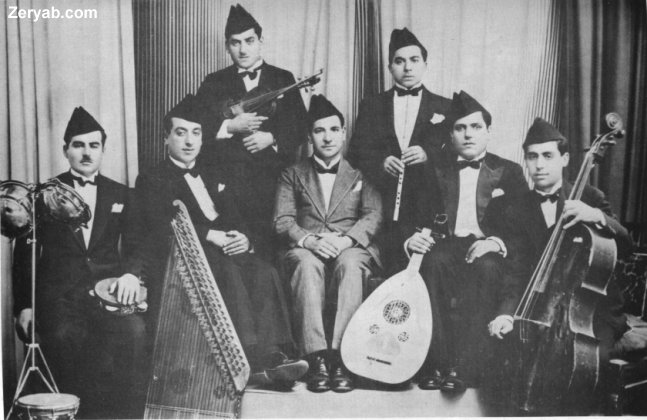
- The brothers with Yusuf Za'arur and their group in Baghdad in 1935.

Background information
- Born: Saleh and Daoud Ezra Ben Jacob Erzoni; 1908 (Saleh); 1910 (Daoud); Sharq, Kuwait
- Origin: Iraq, Kuwait, Iran
- Died: 1986 (aged 77–78) (Saleh); 1976 (aged 65–66) (Daoud) Tel Aviv, Israel
- Genres: Arabic, Iraqi maqam, Kuwaiti sawt

Saleh (1908–1986) and Daud (1910–1976) Al-Kuwaity (Arabic: صالح و داوود الكويتي) were Kuwait-born Israeli musicians of Babylonian and Persian Jewish ancestry who rose to prominence in the Arab world in the early twentieth century. The brothers had a pioneering role in the modern classical music of Iraq and Kuwait, especially the Iraqi maqam and Kuwaiti sawt genres. In 1951, the brothers immigrated from Iraq to Israel.

== Early life and work ==
The brothers were born in Kuwait in 1908 and 1910 to a Mizrahi Jewish family which originally immigrated from Iraq. Their father, who was a merchant of Persian Jewish ancestry, moved to Kuwait from the Iraqi city of Basra. Their family was part of the Kuwaiti Jewish community in the first decade of the twentieth century.

In his childhood, Saleh began studying music in Kuwait from Khaled Al-Bakar, a famous Kuwaiti oud player in the early twentieth century. He soon began to compose his own music. Saleh's first song, "Walla Ajabni Jamalec" (By God, I admire your beauty), is still heard on Gulf radio stations. While still children, the brothers started performing for dignitaries and Al Sabah ruling family members in Kuwait. In 1928, the brothers moved to Basra at age 18 and 20 respectively and continued their music career. In 1932 at the time of Iraq's independence, the brothers gained Iraqi citizenship which was later revoked because they immigrated to Israel in 1951. In the late twentieth century, the brothers died in Tel Aviv as Israeli citizens.

== Legacy ==
Despite the constant state of war between Israel and most of the Arab world, the state-controlled radio in Iraq and Kuwait kept on broadcasting their music after the creation of Israel in 1948. While earlier generations of Arab listeners had been familiar and comfortable with the brothers and their Jewish identity, Arabic radio after the 1970s, increasingly under the control of nationalist movements such as the Ba'ath Party, began to change this by omitting their name, their Jewish identity, or their Israeli citizenship from credits, causing this history to be forgotten; upon his ascent to power in 1979, Saddam Hussein had their names expunged from the Iraqi national archives, re-designating hundreds of their songs as anonymous “folk melodies”.

The brothers had a pioneering role in the modern music of Iraq. Saleh Al-Kuwaiti was considered the father of Iraqi maqam as he was the pioneer of its first song. He also composed for the most famous singers of that era in Iraq, Kuwait, and in the Arab world, such as Salima Pasha, Afifa Iskandar, Nazem al-Ghazali, Umm Kulthum, Mohammed Abdel Wahab and many others. Their music was adored by Faisal II, the last King of Iraq.

The brothers also had a pioneering role in the modern music of Kuwait. They were widely considered among the earliest pioneers of the Kuwaiti sawt genre. According to Saleh in 1979, prior to 1930 the only music known in Kuwait was “Kuwaiti, Bahraini, Yemeni, and Hijazi”. The brothers were one of the earliest Kuwaiti recording artists and joined an ensemble group with other Kuwaiti musicians such as Abdullatif al-Kuwaiti and Saud al-Makhayta. According to Haaretz, the ruler of Kuwait begged Saleh to withdraw his decision to immigrate to Israel because he believed the culture of Kuwait and Iraq would suffer severe damage due to his departure.

In 2009, a street in the Hatikva Quarter of Tel Aviv was named Al Kuwaiti Brothers Street in their memory.

In 2011, Daoud’s grandson, Israeli rock musician Dudu Tassa, formed the band ‘’Dudu Tassa and the Kuwaitis’’ to play his grandfather’s and great-uncle’s music. The band has released three albums and has toured in Israel and elsewhere, opening for Radiohead in their 2017 US tour.

== See also ==
- Music of Iraq
- Music of Kuwait
- History of the Jews in Iraq
- History of the Jews in Kuwait
