= Ismail Fahd Ismail =

Kuwaiti novelist, short story writer, and literary critic (1940–2018)

- إسماعيل فهد إسماعيل الفهد
- Born: 1 January 1940
- Died: September 25, 2018 (aged 78); Kuwait City
- Occupations: Novelist, Literary critic
- Writing career
- Period: 1985–2018
- Genres: Novel, short story

Ismail Fahd Ismail or Ismāʿīl Fahad Ismāʿīl Alfahad (Arabic: إسماعيل فهد إسماعيل الفهد, IPA: [ʔɪs.maːˈʕiːl fad ʔɪs.maːˈʕiːl]; 1940 – 25 September 2018) was aKuwaiti novelist, short story writer, and literary critic. Acclaimed as one of the most significant and prolific writers in the history of Kuwait, he authored over twenty novels, numerous short story collections, and critical publications.

Two of his works were shortlisted for the prestigious International Prize for Arabic Fiction:

- Fī ḥaḍrat al-̔ anqā’ wa al-ḫil al-ūfī (The Phoenix and the faithful friend) in 2014 - This novel tells the story of Ibn Abihi, a bedoon (stateless person) in Kuwaiti society. It is narrated in the first person as Ibn Abihi's autobiography following his release from prison, addressed to his daughter Zeinab, whom he never met.
- Al-Sabiliat in 2017 - This novel is a narrative centered on his own birth village in Iraq against the backdrop of the devastating Iran-Iraq War in the 1980s. The book was translated by Sophia Vasalou and published posthumously in the USA under the title The Old Woman and the River.

== Biography ==
Ismail Fahd Ismail was born in 1940. In the 1950s, he began working as a teacher in Basra.

The late 1950s and 1960s in Iraq were marked by extreme political instability, characterized by violent coups d'état and severe political repression as Arab nationalists and the Ba'ath Party vied for power (the latter had a short-lived government experience following the Ramadan Revolution of 1963, terminated by a second coup d'état led by Abdul Salam Arif). This volatile environment directly led to Ismail Fahd Ismail's imprisonment and eventual return to Kuwait in 1967.

After settling in Kuwait, he graduated in 1976 from the Higher Institute of Dramatic Arts with a degree in Drama and Literary Criticism. He worked in the Kuwaiti public administration at the Ministry of Education until the early 1980s, when he retired to establish his own small literary business.

He died at the age of 78 in Kuwait City on September 25, 2018, and was buried in the Sulaibikhat Cemetery.

== Literary style and themes ==
Ismail Fahd Ismail is considered one of the pioneers of the novel genre in Kuwaiti literature, alongside contemporaries like Laila al-Othman and Farhan Rashid Al-Farhan. At that time the Kuwait had little or no literary production, being one of the Arabic countries where the Nahda came with some delay if compared to the neighbours. Some scholars compare his narrative depth and style to those of Egyptian literary giants Naguib Mahfouz and Tawfiq al-Hakim. He himself admitted to a strong influence from Dostoevsky, specifically citing The Brothers Karamazov. His work also served as an inspiration for a younger generation of Kuwaiti writers, such as Taleb Alrefai.

His literary style often incorporates elements of his first love, cinema, as he mentioned in interviews. His novels were the result of extensive research, embedding the linguistic characteristics of the people and places he described, and drawing on historical events and individuals he encountered. He was also the founder and leader of the literary circle, the Multaqa al-thulatha (The Tuesday's Meetings), held in his Kuwait City office.

The themes in Ismail Fahd's literary production show an interest for the political situation in the Arab world, with first phase focused more on the Iraqi history and politics and a second more focused on Kuwait and Middle East in general:

- Early phase (Iraq-focused): His initial works reflected the trauma and political turmoil of Iraq. The 1965 novel, Al-Habl (The Rope), is a key example, reflecting his experiences in the 1950s and 60s. This vein is also present in his poetry; his 1961 poem, Al-Hadara (The Civilization), was openly critical of Iraqi leader Abdul-Karim Qasim's attempt to annex Kuwait in 1961. Other early works include The Sky was Blue (1970) and Light Swamps (1971).
- Later phase (Kuwait-focused and Arab World issues): His later production moved closer to Kuwaiti social history and broader Arab political concerns. The 1976 novel, Al-Sheiah, addresses events of the Lebanese Civil War and the Palestinian Question, a topic revisited in Ala Uhdat Hanthala (In the Custody of Hanthala), a biographical novel about his friend, the Palestinian cartoonist Naji al-Ali assassinated in London in 1987.

== Selected works ==
Ismail Fahd Ismail published almost thirty different novels in this activity period (1985–2018). Among them:

- The Rope (الحبل رواية, 1965)
- The Sky was blue (كانت السماء زرقاء, 1970)
- Light swamps (المستنقعات الضوئية, 1971)
- Other river banks (الضفاف الأخرى, 1972)
- Cages and Common Language (الأقفاص واللغة المشتركة, 1972)
- File of Incident 67 (ملف الحادثة 67, 1975)
- Circles of Impossibility (دوائر الاستحالة, 1996)
- Al-Sheiah (الشياح, 1976)
- The Birds and Friends (الطيور والأصدقاء, 1979)
- A Step in the Dream (خطوة في الحلم 1980)
- The Nile Flows North – The Beginnings, Part 1 (النيل يجري شمالا - البدايات, 1983)
- The Nile Flows North – The Watchmen, Part 2 (النيل يجري شمالا - النواطير, 1984)
- The Nile Flows North – The Taste and the Smell, Part 3 (النيل الطعم والرائحة, 1989)
- The Phoenix and the faithful friend (في حضرة العنقاء والخل الوفي, 2012)
  - Translated in English: Ismail Fahd Ismail (2019). The Old Woman and the River. Translated by Sophia Vasalou. Interlink Books. ISBN 978-1623719821.

=== Plays ===
- The Text (النص, 1982)
- For the event, the rest of Ibn Zaydun (للحدث بقية ابن زيدون, 2008)

=== Studies ===
- The Arab Story in Kuwait (القصة العربية في الكويت, 1980)
- The Verb in the Theater of Saadallah Wannous (الكلمة - الفعل في مسرح سعد الله ونوس, 1981)
