= Pooyan Azadeh =

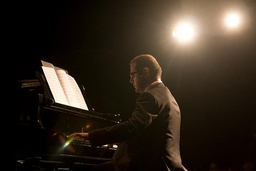
Pooyan Azadeh

Pooyan Azadeh was born in Iran in 1979. He has been playing the piano since his childhood, directed choirs since he was twelve and can already look back on ten years of university teaching experience. He studied classical European and classical Persian music (BA), as well as piano (MA) at the Teheran Academy of Arts and participated in master classes with Prof. Paul Gulda at the Bayreuth Festival of Young Artists in Germany.

His performance as pianist in the concert, “From Orient to Hollywood” in 2010, where he, as the first Persian pianist in Europe, played the second piano concert of Aminollah Hosseins, has earned him special attention among German music circles. As pianist, he received numerous awards and honours at competitions. Persian piano notation (Morteza Mahjoobi's notation) was registered as a National Cultural Heritage of Iran (UNESCO) in 2013 by Pooyan Azadeh.

Since 2007, he has been a full PhD scholarship holder of the German Academic Exchange Service (DAAD). He worked as Asst. Professor at Martin-Luther-University Musical Institute in Germany. He got his doctoral degree from the same university, Martin Luther University in Germany, with great honor "Magna Cum Laude" in January 2015.

In 2015 Dr. Azadeh founded the first professional piano academy in Iran, Pooyan Piano Institute and since 2018 he founded the first music and art university in east of Iran, Pooyan Art University.

As a first piano professor in Iran with a PhD in music he has taught classical piano at the music faculty of Tehran University of Art since 2015.

Recently his composition for piano is published as a book with the title “Persian Songs & Dances for Piano” by “Bellmann Music Publication” in Germany. and his new book with the title "Playing Scales fluently, New Method of Playing Scales Easily on the Piano" was published by Hofmeister Music Publication in Germany in 2023.

For the first time he organized and established a bachelor major degree for “Persian Piano Music Performance” for Iranian higher education at Pooyan Art University in 2020.

Dr. Pooyan Azadeh is founder of "Intercultural Piano Pedagogy Project" which is an international piano project at Festival Young Artists Bayreuth in Germany since 2010.
