= Fijiri =

East Arabian musical style

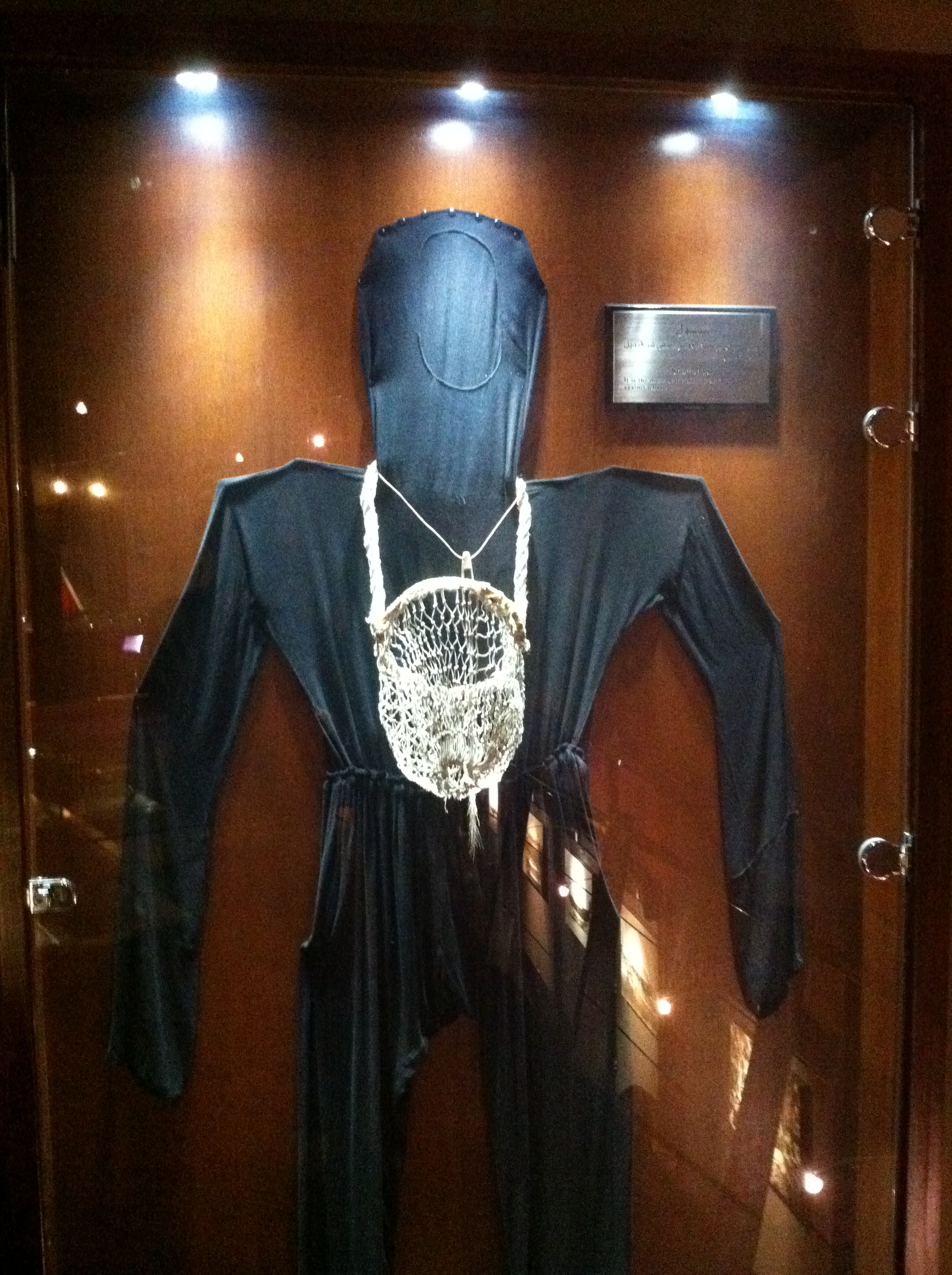
- Clothing used by Kuwaiti divers searching for pearls
- Native name: الفجيري
- Stylistic origins: Kuwaiti and Bahraini music
- Typical instruments: Human voice

Fjiri
- UNESCO Intangible Cultural Heritage
- Country: Bahrain
- Reference: 01747
- Region: Arab States

Inscription history
- Inscription: 2021 (16th session)
- List: Representative

Fijiri (Arabic: الفجيري; sometimes spelled fijri, fidjeri, or fjiri) is the specific repertoire of vocal music sung by the pearl divers of Eastern Arabia's coastal Gulf states, especially Bahrain and Kuwait. A lead singer is backed up by a chorus of accompanying singers and clapping. The accompanying instruments to a fidjeri ensemble are a small double-sided hand-drum, known as the mirwās (المرواس) and the jāhlah (الجاهلة), a clay pot played with both hands.

There are eight genres of fijiri: sanginni (sung on the beach, not on the boat), bahri, adsani, mkholfi, haddadi, hasawi, zumayya, and dan; the last two are viewed as subgenres of hasawi and mkholfi respectively. Bahri and adsani are the two main genres. Pearl diver singers are referred to in Arabic as nahham (نهام). Salem Allan and Ahmad Butabbaniya are two of the most well-known fijiri singers from Bahrain.

== See also ==
- Music of Bahrain
- Music of Kuwait
- Culture of Eastern Arabia
- Sawt (music)
- Liwa (music)
- Pearl diving
