= Rugby union in Kuwait =

Rugby union in Kuwait is a minor sport.

== Governing body ==
The Kuwait Rugby Football Union is the governing body, but is currently under the Arabian Gulf Rugby Football Union (AGRFU). The AGRFU was founded in 1977, and joined the IRB in 1990. By the end of 2010, the AGRFU will be broken up, with new unions to be established in each member country, as announced in January 2009 by the IRB. The first national union to be formed from the AGRFU is expected to be that of the UAE.

== History ==
Rugby was first brought to the region, by the British military around the mid 20th century. In addition, some Arabian royals and nobles have been sending their sons to English private schools for years, where they have picked up the game.

The sport was reintroduced by Commonwealth ex-patriates working in the oil industry, and they continue to dominate the game.

The sport experienced some expansion in Kuwait during the 1980s. The club had always played at Ahmadi under the auspices of the Kuwait Oil Company, but due to company policy the ground was closed to the rugby club. This resulted in the members building a new ground in Fintas and changing the club’s name. The club returned to Ahmadi in 1989.

Unfortunately the Gulf War in 1990-91 created many problems, from damage to physical infrastructure, and great hardship to residents. The war caused the deaths of around 1,000 Kuwaiti civilians killed during the Iraqi occupation in addition to 300,000 refugees. Many of Kuwaiti rugby's main supporters, i.e. white expatriates left shortly before or after the conflict.

Kuwait currently has one adult rugby club, The Kuwait Scorpions, having recently reverted to the original name. The club was founded in 1946 and is one of the oldest rugby clubs within the Persian Gulf region. Original numbers dwindled as many players left the country due to the political situation within the region.

The Kuwait Saracens RFC, the only youth rugby club in Kuwait, was established at the end of the 08/09 season after lack of funding and ever-dwindling player numbers in the former youth club threatened the future of youth rugby in Kuwait.

== See also ==
- Rugby union in the Arabian Peninsula
