= Saikuraa Ibrahim Naeem =

Saikuraa Ibrahim Naeem (SINAF)(1935–2008) was a Maldivian writer and government officer.

Ibrahim Naeem began serving the government in 1953, when he was 18 years of age.

After many years working in various posts in the government of the Maldives, he served the last seventeen years of his life at the President's Office.

Despite his high status and respect accorded to him, Naeem led a simple life and kept away from un-Maldivian luxury and excessive display of wealth.

== Works ==
Saikuraa Ibrahim Naeem was a writer and a poet. Most of his writings were published under his pen name "SINAF."

Saikuraa Ibrahim Naeem was the editor of the famous daily news outlet "Moonlight", which was the most popular daily paper in Maldives during President Nasir's regime. He wrote love stories in his earlier time as a writer, the most popular being "Yamanuge Mausooma". He wrote many song lyrics and poems. Some of his lyrics are:

- Mi zahar leyaa gulheythan nudhekeysha maruvedhaanan (Vocal: Ibrahim Hamdhee) 2.

- Naazuku loabi dhiyaeema ruimey..(Vocal: Ibrahim Hamdhee) 3.

- Nunidheynehaa sazaadhee (Vocal: Ibrahim Hamdhee - Mahmoodha Shakeeb)

He also was an orator, often utilizing humor and precise language in his speeches.
