= Fatimah Yousif al-Ali =

Kuwaiti journalist and author

Fatimah Yousif al-Ali (born 1953) is a Kuwaiti journalist and short story writer. A graduate in Arabic Literature from Cairo University, in 1971 she became the first Kuwaiti woman to write a novel. She has also published four collections of short stories. She is a prominent member of the Kuwaiti Literary Association. Her work has been published in Banipal magazine.
