= Taibah Al-Ibrahim =

Taibah Al-Ibrahim (طِيبة أحمد الإبراهيم; c. 1945 – 28 December 2011) was a Kuwaiti writer who wrote the first science fiction book in Kuwait. She was candidate for The third constituency in Kuwait in 2008. She died in 2011 at the age of 66. She received a certificate of appreciation from the literary and artistic services for the three science fictions "الإنسان الباهت", "الإنسان المتعدد", "انقراض الرجل" (The extinction of men). Al-Ibrahim was candidate for The third constituency in Kuwait in 2008. She said "she would press for equality between the two genders and to render divorce applicable with the consent of the man and the woman." She called for "separation of religion from the state because there is a difference between religious people and a religious state, to keep the religion at distance from human errors."

== Bibliography ==
- الإنسان الباهت : published in 1986
- الإنسان المتعدد : published in 1990
- انقراض الرجل (The extinction of men) : published in 1990
- ظلال الحقيقة : in 1995
- مذكرات خادم : First part was published in 1986 and the second part in 1995
- لعنة المال (The curse of money): (a fantasy novel, a symbol of Arab Countries)
- أشواك الربيع (Spring thorns): social-romantic novel, a teenage girl dreams of 1979
- القلب القاسي (Cruel heart): a social-mystery novel
- حذار أن تقتل (Beware to kill): a political short story
