= Liwa (music) =

Līwa (Arabic: ليوه / ALA-LC: laywah) is a Khaleeji traditional dance of African origin performed in Eastern Arabia (Arab states of the Persian Gulf), mainly within communities of descendants of people from the Swahili Coast (Tanzania and Zanzibar). It is also performed by the African-descended Sheedi community, as well as the Baloch of Makran Coast and Karachi area.

== Overview ==
A large number of male participants arrange themselves into a circle, which is anchored by one or several drum players. A man paces in the middle of the group playing a simple reed instrument called mizmar or surnai, whose plaintive sharp sound reminds the listener of an oboe. The circle claps and dances in place, while individuals join a line which rhythmically paces around the inside of the circle. The Liwa is a more casual dance than the others, and can be performed with great spirit and banter from the young men who usually take part.

The three backing drums for this dance are the shindo, the jabwah, and the jasser. More recently, a fourth drum—known as the Peeper—was added. This drummer plays a dominant role, which gives him plenty of opportunity for a virtuoso performance.

The mizmar has an oboe-like sound and produces a haunting melody, which is lent particular poignancy by the eastern tonic scale to which it is tuned. Like the oboe, it is made in two pieces, with a double reed fitted into the second piece. The best instruments these days are made of African hardwood in Mombassa and Dar Es Salaam. Their cost can be as high as $2,000.

The Liwa begins with a mizmar solo of about six minutes in slow tempo. The drums join in, followed by the ten dancers/singers, and gradually the pace increases to reach a spectacular swirl of activity. The whole dance takes about 25 minutes and both men and women can be involved in a performance.

The singing is always performed in Swahili—the native language of Tanzania and Zanzibar. These were both major trading partners with the Persian Gulf in centuries past, and have lent their language and culture to influence this fascinating dance.

It is especially performed on Eid and other celebrations.

== See also ==
- Fann At-Tanbura
- Fijiri
- Sawt (music)
- Yowlah
