= Persian ritual music =

Persian ritual music (sometimes called Iranian Ritual Music) (Persian: موسیقی مذهبی ایران) is a type of Persian music which is used for religious ceremonies.

Persian religious music can be used for various religions which are practiced in Persia/Persis such as Islam and Zoroastrianism.

The ethnomusicologists such as Mohammad-Taghi Massoudieh did research about Persian ritual music. Massoudieh also published a book in Persian on this issue.
