= Culture of Oman =

The culture of Oman encompasses the customs, traditions and social practices of the country’s population. Islam is the state religion, and the country’s Muslim population includes Ibadi, Sunni and Shia communities.

== Dress ==
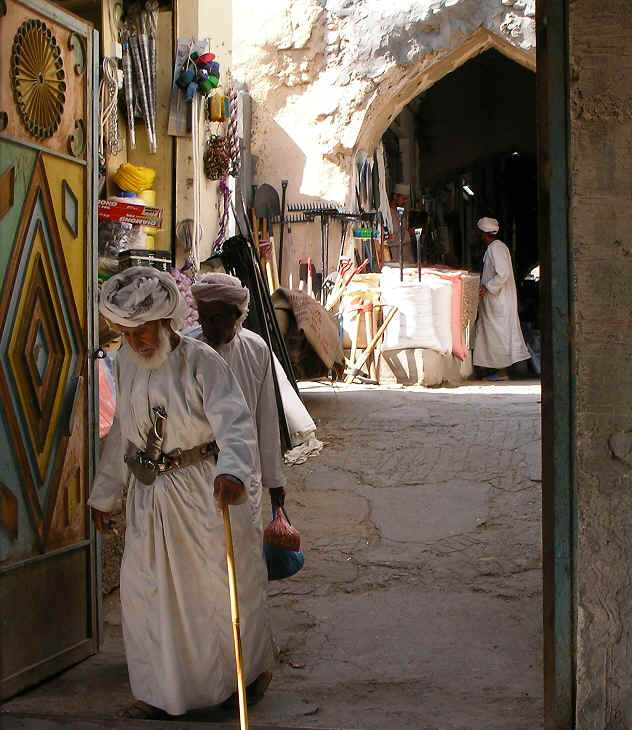
Omanis in a souq in Nizwa

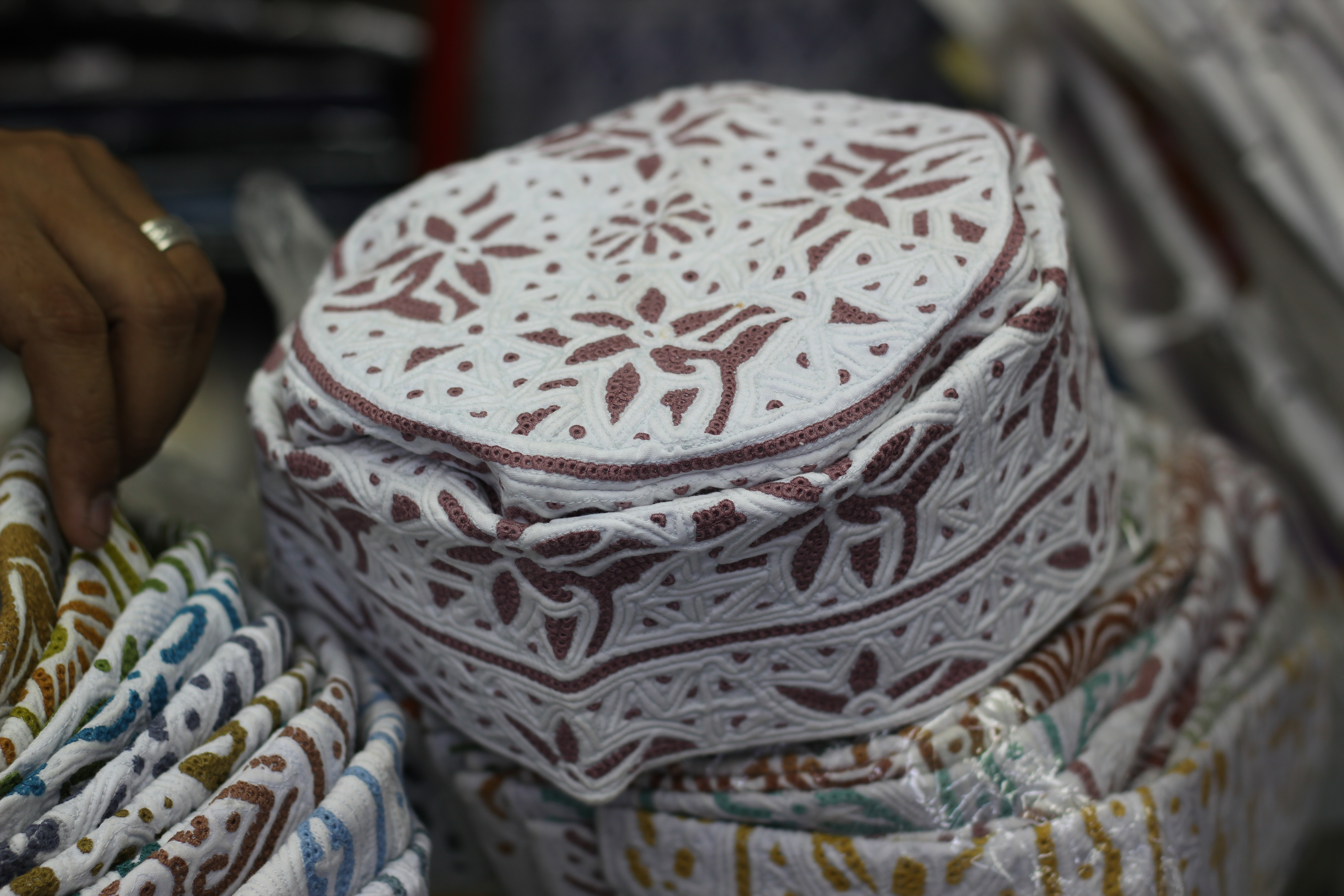
Embroidered kummahs traditionally worn by Omani men.

Traditional male dress in Oman includes the dishdasha, an ankle-length, collarless robe with long sleeves. Men may wear it with the kummah, an embroidered cotton cap, or the massar, an embroidered cloth wrapped around the head; the kummah is also commonly worn as part of everyday dress. The khanjar forms part of traditional male dress in Oman and is worn at national and religious events and on special occasions such as weddings. The craft skills and social practices associated with it were inscribed on UNESCO’s Representative List of the Intangible Cultural Heritage of Humanity in 2022.

Traditional women’s dress in Oman varies by region in its cut, colours, fabrics and embroidery. It commonly consists of a dress worn over trousers known as sirwal and a head covering known as lihaf. In public, many women also wear an abaya over their clothing and a hijab.

== Dhow ==
Oman’s maritime heritage is represented by the Jewel of Muscat, a reconstruction of a ninth-century Arab dhow based on the Belitung shipwreck. Built in Oman using archaeological evidence and features found in traditional Omani vessels, it was sailed from Oman to Singapore along the Maritime Silk Route.

== Cuisine ==
Omani cuisine reflects Arabian, Indian and African influences. Common dishes include mishkak (grilled meat skewers), harees (a wheat-and-meat dish), qabooli (rice served with meat, nuts and raisins), and shuwa (slow-roasted, lightly spiced meat). Omani coffee, known as kahwa, is flavoured with cardamom and is commonly served with dates or Omani halwa as part of hospitality traditions.

=== Dates in Omani culture ===
Date palms have longstanding social, religious and economic significance in Oman. The knowledge, skills, traditions and practices associated with the date palm in Oman and other Arab countries are included on UNESCO’s Representative List of the Intangible Cultural Heritage of Humanity. A 2010 study, using figures from 2007, reported more than 250 date varieties in Oman and estimated that date palms occupied about half of the country’s agricultural land.

== See also ==
- Islam in Oman
- List of museums in Oman
- Music of Oman
- Cinema of Oman
- Women in Oman
- Culture of Eastern Arabia
