= Najma Idrees =

Kuwaiti poet, columnist and scholar (born 1952)

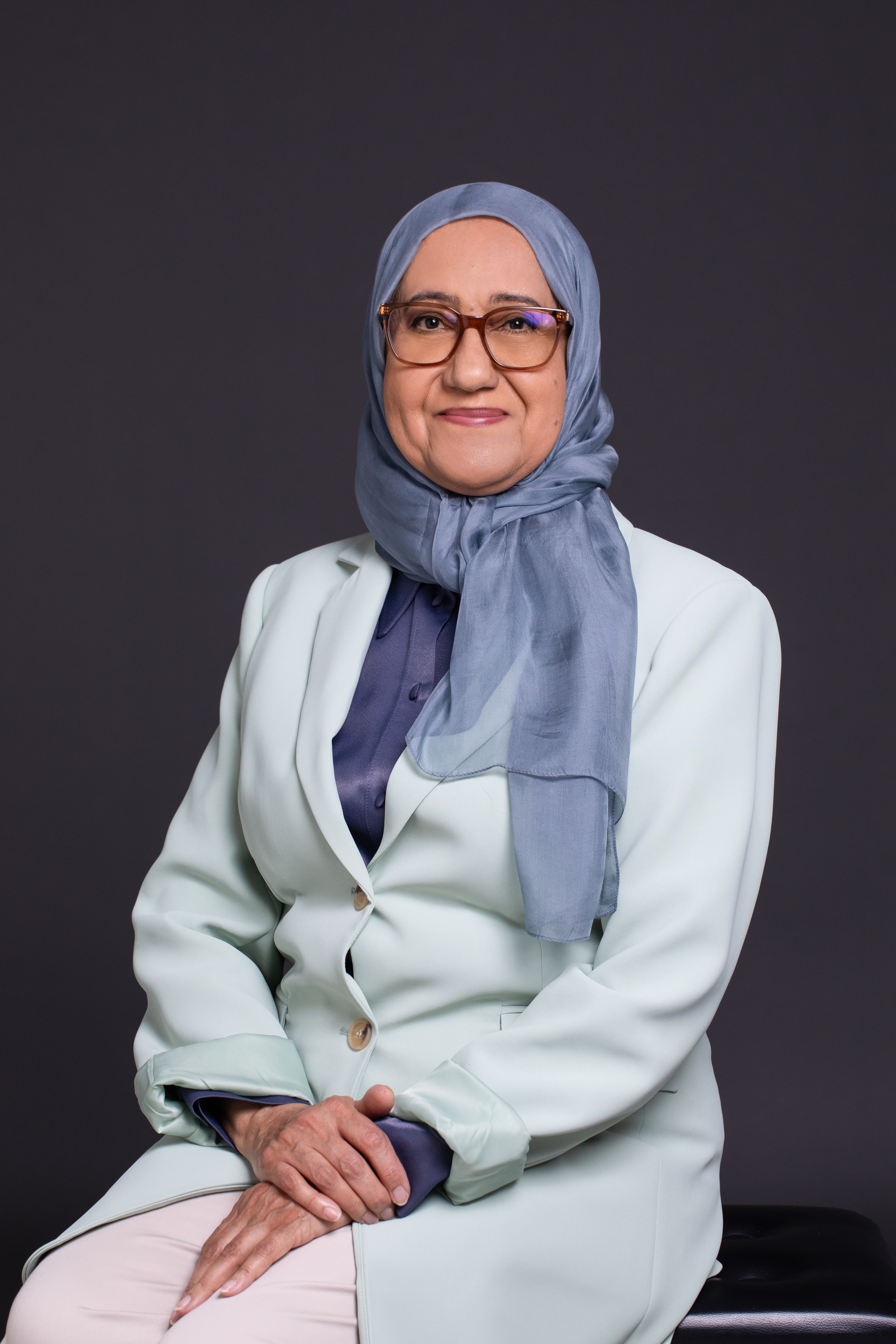
Dr. Najma Idrees

Najma Abdullah Idrees (Arabic: نجمة عبدالله إدريس; born 25 December 1952) is a Kuwaiti poet, columnist, and scholar.

== Biography ==
Idrees was born in 1952 in Kuwait, and graduated from Kuwait University in 1976 as an Arabic literature major. She attained her PhD in 1987 from London University's School of Oriental and African Studies in which her dissertation topic was on 'The Concept of Death and its Development in Modern Arabic Poetry' (Arabic: مفهوم الموت وتطوره في الشعر العربي الحديث).

Idrees started writing as a poet and researcher since her early university years, and has published most of her early works on Al-Bayan magazine which is issued by the Kuwaiti Writers Association.

She is a frequent participant in the Cultural Weeks hosted by the National Council for Culture, Arts and Literature which takes place annually in different Arab countries.

Her contributions also include weekly columns for Al-Jarida newspaper, articles for monthly magazines, and open discussions in the local press and radio interviews.

== Honors and awards ==
- Arab Women Award (Kuwait 2013)
- State of Kuwait Prize in the field of literature. (2002)

== Books ==
- My Language Fractures. I Grow (Arabic: تتكسّر لغتي .. أنمو)
