= Manjur (instrument) =

Musical instrument in the Arab States of the Persian Gulf

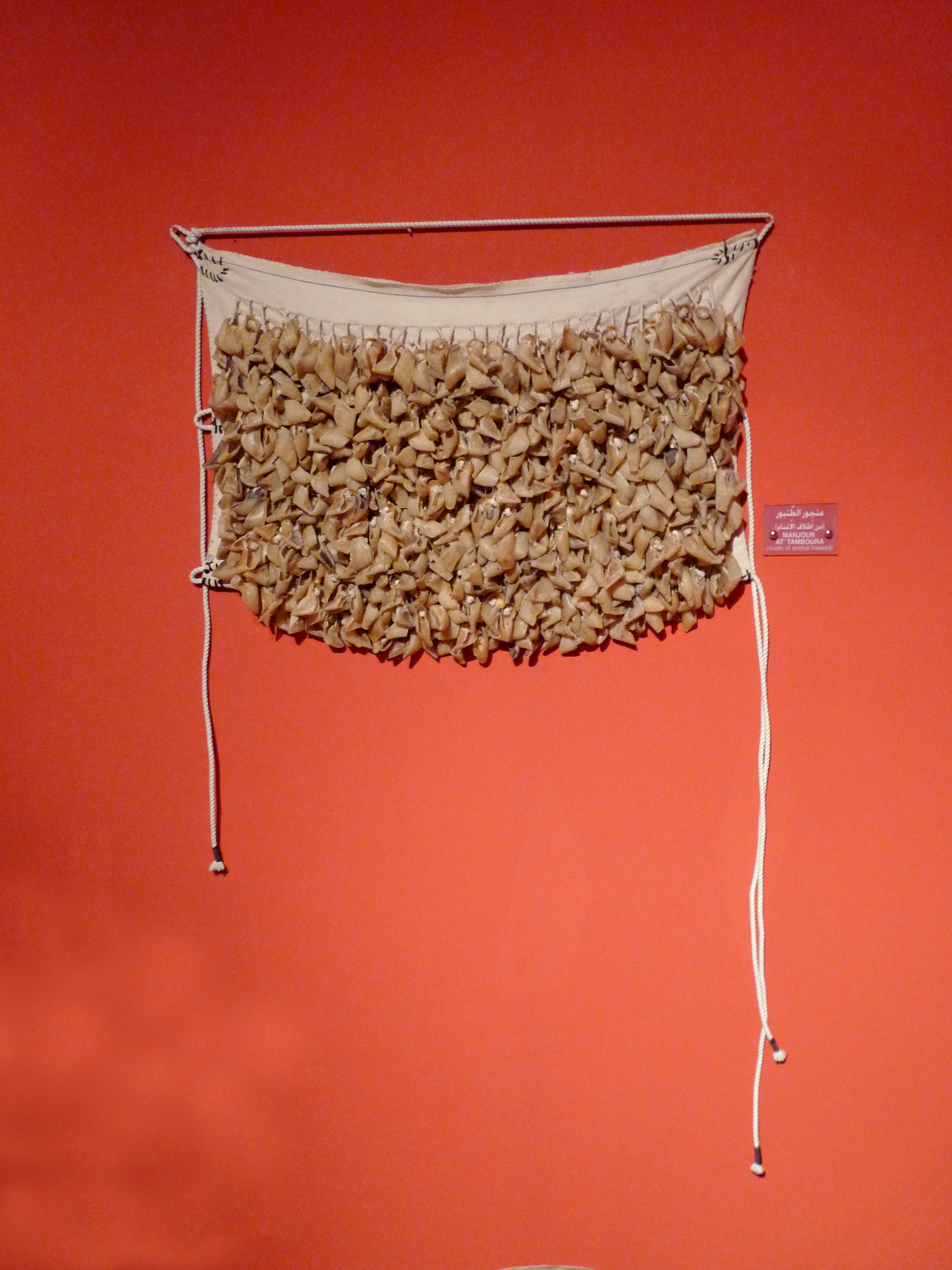
Manjur, Bait Al Baranda Museum in Muscat (Oman)

The manjur (Arabic: المنجور) is a musical instrument used in Eastern Arabia. It is made of goat hooves attached to a cloth. It is played by tying the instrument around the waist. The performer then shakes their hips to create a rattling sound as the hooves collide with one other.

It is used in the fann at-Tanbura and zar performances.

== See also ==
- Kahliji
