= Taleb Alrefai =

Kuwaiti journalist and writer

Taleb Alrefai (born 1958) is a Kuwaiti journalist and writer, born in Kuwait. An employee of Kuwait’s National Council for Culture, Arts, & Letters, and the monthly tabloid Jaridat Al-Fonoon, a monthly arts tabloid, his novels include Shade of the Sun (Dar Al-Sharqiyyat) (1998), Samar's Words (Dar al-Mada) (2006) and The Nejdi (al-Najdi) (2017). His work has been published Banipal magazine.

== Publications ==
Ici même, traduit de l’arabe (Koweït) par Mathilde Chèvre, Actes Sud, 2016, 160 p. (ISBN 978-2-330-05789-3)
