= Sawt (music) =

Music genre from Kuwait and Bahrain

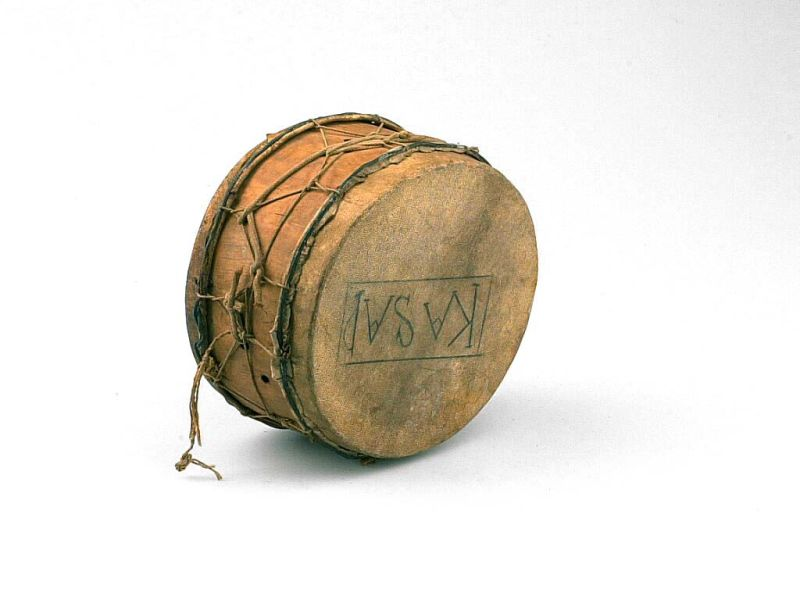
Mirwas drum

Sawt (Arabic: صوت / ALA-LC: Ṣawt; literally "voice"; also spelled sout or sowt) is a kind of popular music found in Kuwait and Bahrain.

== History ==
It is said that sawt was established in Kuwait by the poet, composer, singer and oud player Abdallah al-Faraj (1836-1901/1903). The Bahraini historian Mubārak al-'Ammārī believes that sawt was known in Kuwait before 1766, and in Bahrain since 1783. Saleh and Daoud Al-Kuwaity were widely considered among one of its earliest pioneers.

== Description ==
Sawt is a complex form of urban music, originally performed on the 'ud (plucked lute) and mirwas (a drum), with a violin later supplementing the arrangement.

Two men perform the dance, which is called "Zaffan". Al-Sout is performed only at night gatherings of men. It is called "Samra" (nightly chat).

Sawt also contains a special type of clapping called sherbaka, which means "intertwined," and is usually performed by spectators only on Arabic and Levantine scales. The poetry used in sawt is usually classical Arabic poetry, or khamini poetry, which is similar to mushah, but with scales characteristic of ancient Yemeni poets and their local language. Most Arabic and Levantine sawts end with a fragment called Tawshih, which is the beginning of the end of the sawt and can be lyrical or musical only. Tawshih also contains improvised rhythms, and some end it with a specific melody to finish the sawt.

Some sources indicate that the history of the art of sawt began before the advent of Abdullah al-Faraj, and that it is related to the sound singing that was prevalent in the Abbasid era, as Ahmed Ali notes in his book Music and Singing in Kuwait. As for Mubarak al-Omari, in his book "Muhammad bin Faris: The Most Famous Sawt Singer in the Persian Gulf", points out that sawt arrived in Bahrain from Kuwait in 1766.

== See also ==
- Saleh and Daoud Al-Kuwaity
- Music of Kuwait
- Culture of Kuwait
- Culture of Bahrain
- Fijiri
