= Laila al-Othman =

Kuwaiti writer

- Born: 17 October 1943 (age 82); Kuwait
- Writing career
- Language: Novelist

Laila al-Othman (sometimes Laylā al-'Uthmān) is a Kuwaiti writer, novelist, short story writer, and a famous fictionist who was born into a prominent Kuwaiti family in 1943, and only 22 years later she made her writing debut in a local newspaper featuring her opinion on social and literary issues. During the course of her career, she has published 14 collections of short stories, nine novels, and many news articles.

== Biography ==
=== Early life ===
Laila al-Othman, is the fourth girl of the family, she was born in 1943 in Kuwait at a small seaside town. When she was born, her mother threw her out a window because she wanted a son. In the end, al-Othman was saved by the nurse. Many of her future works are inspired by this unfortunate event. Sometime in her childhood, her parents divorced, and al-Othman ended up living with her father and step-sisters.

Living in the father's post-divorce house was not pleasant. She was negatively labeled "the daughter of the first wife" and was mistreated by her stepmother and step-siblings. Her father ignored her and he remained absent for most of her early life. She began drawing on walls as a source of solace from her turmoils. While confined to her father's home, al-Othman demonstrated her love for education, which led her father and poet, Abdallah al-Othman, to open up his library to her. He told her that "one day, you'll be a famous poet." Abdallah forced al-Othman to attend all of his literary forums, but he did not allow her to publish any articles under her own name. She moved out of her father's house in 1965 and was truly free for the first time.

=== Education ===
Laila al-Uthman's education was cut short despite her want to learn. At a young age, her teachers nurtured her talents and encouraged her. However, she was withdrawn from school due to old Arab traditions that forced women to stay home after the marriage of their older siblings. After she graduated from her local high school, she did not pursue a post-secondary education, but she was still able to succeed as a writer.

=== Marriage ===
Al-Othman decided to marry a Palestinian doctor and ignored the conservative expectation to marry one's own cousins. Her husband was supportive of her writings and encouraged her to publish them. Simultaneously, al-Othman's father tried to prevent her from publishing, but when he died shortly after her marriage her name appeared in many newspapers and publications. She began writing for a daily column in the Al-Siyasah newspaper.

Al-Othman was remarried to Walid Abu Bakr, a fellow Kuwaiti writer and novelist. He was banished from Kuwait after Kuwait gained back its freedom from Iraq. Despite facing another obstacle after the Persian Gulf War, al-Othman remained positive. She said in an interview that “I am living a new childhood with my grandchildren. My life is full of happiness. I realized my dream and became a loved writer.”

== Influences ==
=== Political conflicts ===
During the Persian Gulf War, al-Uthman remained in Kuwait to experience the brutal struggles of war. This upheaval broke apart al-Othman and her family. She recounted these painful memories in many of her written pieces including Ayyâm Fi al-Yaman (Days in Yemen) and Yawmiyyât as-Sabr wa al-Murr (A Diary of Patience and Bitterness). In some of these writings, the violent images of war is juxtaposed to the serene image of the Persian Gulf when it created the first Arab Parliament.

Another conflict that influenced her was the 2006 Lebanon War. The fighting in the country that she loved since her visit at the age of 8 years old inspired her to write Al-‘Asas (The Coccyx) and Al-Mahkama (The Trial).

=== Personal ===
Many of her writings, although fictional, are heavily influenced by her past. Lubnan Nisf al-Qalb (Lebanon, The Heart’s Other Half) is based on her love for Lebanon that she developed when she visited the country for the first time at the age of 8 years old, "Wasmiyya comes out of the Sea," is based on her birth when her mother tried to throw her out the window, "Days in Yemen" and "A Diary of Patience and Bitterness," are parallels of her experiences with the Kuwaiti and Iraqi conflict.

Her works often deal with social conflict between men and women in Arabic society and the aspirations of women and their potential power in a hostile environment. Among her works are the novels The Woman and the Cat (1985), Sumayya Comes Out of the Sea (1986) and The Trial (2000) and the short stories A Woman in a Vessel (1976), The Departure (1979) and Love Has Many Images (1982).

== Criticism ==
Her openness on social issues made her the target of criticism. She is against Islamists, they have filed lawsuits against her. In 2000 al-Uthman was briefly imprisoned for making blasphemous statements. The conviction is a result of her usage of the provocative words in her novel The Departure though both words had been approved by the Kuwaiti government back in 1984. Eventually, she was released on bail after 2 months.

== Legacy ==
=== Laila al-Othman prize ===
In 2004 Uthman started giving out the Laila al-Othman prize. The prize is presented every two years to one talented young Arab writer for his or her creative fiction writings.

Among the award recipients, were Saud Alsanousi in 2010, and Bassam Almusallam in 2013.

=== Current life ===
She is analyzing the Arab world and does not plan to write a novel on it any time soon. When asked about the future of the Arab world, she responded optimistically but she does issue a caveat that if “the Islamists get power, especially in Egypt, this will be a real catastrophe that falls upon the Arab world.”

She has stated that she is working on a new novel that focuses on her forgotten neighborhood of Kuwait. She recently made a trip to Beirut for a book signing to promote her new book Aba’at Al-Maqam.

== Works ==
=== Novels ===
- “Al-Mar’a wal Qitta” (“The Woman and the Cat”)(1985)
- ”Wasmiyah Leaves The Sea|Wasmiya takhruju min al-Bahr” (”Wasmiyah Leaves The Sea”) (1986)
- ”Al-Muhâkama…Maqta’ Min Sirat al-Wâqi’” (”The Trial… A Glimpse of Reality”) (2000)
- ”Al-‘Asas” (”The Coccyx”)
- ”Ayyâm Fi al-Yaman” (”Days in Yemen”) (2004)
- ”Yawmiyyât as-sabr wa al-Murr” (”A Diary of Patience and Bitterness”) (2003)

=== Short story collections ===
- “I’mraa’ fi Ina’” (“A Woman in a Vase”) (1976)
- “Ar-Raheel” (“The Departure”) (1979)
- ”Aba’at al-Maqâm” (2012)
- ”Khamsat was Khamsûn Hikâyat Qaseera” (“55 Short Tales“) (1992)
- “Fathiah takhtar Mawtaha” (“Fathieh Chooses her Demise”) (1987)

=== Recognition ===
- Wasmiya takhruju min al-Bahr (Wasmiyya comes out of the Sea) (1986): This novel was chosen as one of top 100 Arab novels written in the 21st century and has been adapted into a movie, a radio show, and a play.
