= Fann at-Tanbura =

Fann aṭ-Ṭanbūra (Arabic: فن الطنبورة) is a traditional music and dance genre in the Arab states of the Persian Gulf, especially Bahrain, Kuwait and Oman. Musically, the tanbūra instrument plays a central role, along with several drums and the manjur— an instrument made from a large number of goat hooves attached to a type of apron which is wrapped around the waist of the performer.

Men and women both participate in the singing and dance. Fann at-tanbura is closely associated with the Zār spiritual ritual, and it was originally used in healing practices. Participants would occasionally fall into a trance. In modern times though it is more often a musical performance.

== See also ==
- Middle Eastern dance
- Culture of Eastern Arabia
