= List of oud players =

This is a list of people notable for playing the oud:

== A ==
- Mohammed Abdel Wahab
- Rabih Abou-Khalil
- Mohamed Abozekry
- Ahmed Abdul-Malik
- Rahim AlHaj
- Abdel Karim al Kabli
- Khyam Allami
- Tarek Abdallah

== B ==
- Jamil Bachir
- Munir Bashir
- Omar Bashir
- Hossein Behroozinia
- John Bilezikjian
- John Berberian
- Waed Bouhassoun
- Anouar Brahem
- Sandy Bull
- Roman Bunka
- Shaul Bustan
- Yorgo Bacanos
- Negar Bouban

== D ==
- Fatemeh Deghani
- Yair Dalal
- Hamza El Din
- Ara Dinkjian
- Jo Dusepo

== E ==
- Driss El Maloumi
- Abdel Aziz El Mubarak

== F ==
- Farid al-Atrash

== H ==
- Richard Hagopian
- Sakher Hattar

== J ==
- Wissam Joubran

== K ==
- Georges Kazazian
- Tigrane Kazazian
- Chris Karrer
- Udi Hrant Kenkulian
- Gülçin Yahya Kaçar

== L ==
- Chris Leslie
- David Lindley

== M ==
- Aar Maanta
- Hamdi Makhlouf
- Daron Malakian
- Jiim Sheikh Muumin
- Omar Metioui
- Mutref Al Mutref

== N ==
- Hani Naser
- Mansour Nariman

== Q ==
- Abdullahi Qarshe

== S ==
- Coşkun Sabah
- Simon Shaheen
- Naseer Shamma
- Ali Sriti
- Riad Al Sunbati

== T ==
- Cinuçen Tanrıkorur
- Joseph Tawadros
- Omar Faruk Tekbilek
- Aram Tigran
- Tamino-Amir Moharam Fouad
- Zaidoon Treeko

== Y ==
- Haig Yazdjian
- Dhafer Youssef
