= Mady Humbert-Lavergne =

French ethnomusicologist and musician (1898–1987)

Madeleine "Mady" Humbert-Sauvageot (née Humbert, 19 October 1898–1987) was a French ethnomusicologist, composer and singer. She was also commonly known as Mady Humbert-Lavergne and Melle Lavergne following her first marriage.

On at least one occasion she adopted a male pseudonym. When she registered three songs with the French Society of Authors, Composers, and Publishers of Music (SACEM) in 1956 she asked to be referred to as "Jean Ariel". In 1962, she published Ta voix et ses sortilèges, a book under the pseudonym "Lancelot".

According to the Paris Conservatory, Humbert-Sauvageot had a considerable influence on the music of her time, and introduced the music of Africa, Asia and the Arab world to composers such as Olivier Messiaen and Pierre Boulez.

== Early life and education ==
Mady Humbert-Sauvageot's parents worked at the restaurant Le Pharamond in Paris. She grew up in what she described as "a cosmopolitan milieu with very different religions", where she listened to songs in many different languages and "learned little songs from the age of four."

She studied organ, composition, musicology, and folklore at the Paris Conservatoire, graduating in both singing and piano. Around 1927, she studied Indian music with Professor Dilipkumar Roy in Paris.

== Research and work ==
In 1927, the Phonetic Institute of the Sorbonne commissioned her to catalogue and evaluate its sound archive. In 1929, she travelled on behalf of the university to assist Philippe Stern in recording traditional music in Greece and Romania. The following year, she and Stern, both working for the Musée de la Parole et du Geste, were commissioned to record music and speech at the 1931 Paris Colonial Exposition, contributing to what is now critically regarded as a "sensitive collection". It was Humbert-Lavergne who did the work on the ground, interacting with the protagonists, listening, taking notes, cataloguing.

As both a composer/singer and musicologist, Humbert-Sauvageot maintained a strong interest in the ondes musicales and actively contributed to its development. On at least one occasion, she performed on the instrument herself—in a production by the Comédiens routiers, a Catholic amateur theater group considered a pioneer of modern popular theater, including for their 1932–33 season production of La Compassion de Notre Dame at the Salle Pleyel.

She also gave numerous public performances as a soprano, including a 1933 concert at the Salle Pleyel with an ondes Martenot quartet featuring Maurice Martenot and his sister, Ginette Martenot. One critic described the concert as "a prophetic demonstration of some of the possibilities of Martenot’s unique discovery."

Her Danse araucane for ondes Martenot and piano premiered at the 1937 Paris World's Fair and was later released on LP in 1965. Her Concertino pour une onde et deux pianos (1957) premiered at the Paris Conservatoire on 10 January 1958.

Mady Humbert-Sauvageot worked in and across Parisian music circles in various capacities. Through the pianist and ethnomusicologist Yvette Grimaud, she met Pierre Boulez, to whom she introduced non-European music and taught to transcribe recordings. As she later recalled: "When I had the honour of assembling many young musicians in a very small room that was at our disposal, there was so little space that some of them, like Boulez, sat under the piano. It was great because I played all the discs I had recorded." When Boulez's Le Visage nuptial premiered in 1947, she sang the soprano part—as she did in concerts of microtonal music by Ivan Wyschnegradsky in Paris.

== Cairo Congress of Arab Music ==
Mady Humbert-Lavergne was one of three French delegates to the Cairo Congress of Arab Music in 1932. The Congress gathered musicologists, musicians and amateur music lovers from the Arabic-speaking world and Europe, as well as from Turkey. They convened for three weeks at the Institute of Arab Music (then: Royal Institute of Oriental Music) in Downtown Cairo. Mady Humbert-Lavergne was one of only two female delegates, next to her colleague Jeanne Herscher-Clément.

During discussions of the Music Instrument Commission she made a proposal: "a musical instrument which can play all Arab melodies was recently invented in France. It is known as ondes musicales and I take the opportunity now to recommend the use of this instrument in Arab music."

Her proposal wasn't met with any documented reaction, though at least some of the commission members were familiar with the newly invented instrument. Around 1930, parallel developments in three European cities led to the creation of new electronic instruments: the trautonium in Berlin, the theremin in Leningrad, and the ondes musicales (later known as ondes Martenot) in Paris. Composer Paul Hindemith was involved in the development of the trautonium at the Rundfunkversuchsstelle (Radio Experimental Studio), where radio practitioners, engineers, and composers collaborated to explore the acoustic potential of frequency technologies for music, film, and broadcasting. Hindemith composed for the trautonium before he traveled to Cairo in 1932. Once there, he seems to have set aside his avant-garde work, and the possibility of applying contemporary developments in electronic music to Arab music appears not to have occurred to him—or to other delegates from the Berlin School of Comparative Musicology.

== Legacy ==
It was through finding Humbert-Lavergne's documented proposal to introduce the Ondes Martenot into Arab music, that Julia Tieke started researching her life and work and both publishing about her and taking the proposal as an inspiration and starting point for several project in changing collaborations with Khyam Allami, Julie Normal and Nancy Mounir.

On 10 April 2026, an evening at the Paris Conservatory was dedicated to her, under the title "Les Musique Lointaines de Mady Sauvageot" ("The distant music of Mady Sauvageot"). Some of her handwritten scores as well as publications are archived at the Mediathèque Hector Berlioz of the Paris Conservatoire.

== Publications ==
The Médiathèque Hector Berlioz at the Paris Conservatorium lists the following works by Mady Humbert-Sauvageot in their archives:

=== Published scores ===
- Onze Colindes et cinq chants populaires roumains. Notés et harmonisés par M. Humbert-Lavergne. Editions de l'Oiseau-Lyre (1933)
- 6 histoires de notes racontées par des petites mains, Mady-Pierre (1935)

=== Handwritten scores ===
- Chant épique for 4 ondes Martenot
- Danse mystique for ondes Martenot and piano
- Danse péruvienne for 2 ondes Martenot
- Danse rituelle araucane for ondes Martenot and piano
- Danse rituelle araucane for 8 ondes Martenot
- Magnificat for ondes Martenot, voice and orgue
- Puck for ondes Martenot
- Sardaigne for voice and piano
- Bate vantul prin ovăz // Le vent souffle à travers l'avoine for piano

=== Books ===
- Dix-huit chants et poèmes mongols recueillis par la princesse Nirgidma de Torhout et transcrits par Mme Humbert-Sauvageot. Bibliothèque musicale du Musée Guimet (1937)
- Ta voix et ses sortilèges. Paris : Éditions Boutan-Marguin (1962, pseudonyme : Lancelot)

=== Magazine article ===
- "L'Inde et la musique". In Message actuel de l'Inde, sous la direction de Jean Masui. Marseille: Les Cahiers du sud (1941)

=== Sound recordings ===
- "Danse rituelle araucane" and "Nègres du Brésil" in Musique rituelle à travers temps et pays., Karine, L., Caron, N., Boyer, G., Matagne, M., Dillies, L. (1962). Disques Festival.
- Arrieu, C. & Schaeffer, P. La Coquille à planètes: Suite fantastique pour une voix et douze monstres en huit émissions radiophoniques (1943–1944). Disques Adès (1990).
