= Barbat (lute) =

Central Asian lute

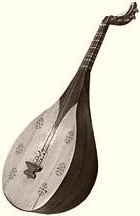
- Modern barbat with six courses of strings.

String instrument
- Classification: Plucked string instrument

Related instruments
- Lute; Oud; Mandolin

The barbat (Persian: بربت) or barbud is a lute of Greater Iranian or Persian origin, and widespread across Central Asia, especially since the Sasanian Empire. Barbat is characterized as carved from a single piece of wood, including the neck and a wooden sound board. Possibly a skin-topped instrument for part of its history, it is ancestral to the wood-topped oud and biwa and the skin-topped Yemeni qanbus.

Although the original barbat disappeared, modern Iranian luthiers have invented a new instrument, inspired by the Barbat. The modern re-created instrument (Iranian Barbat) resembles the oud, although differences include a smaller body, longer neck, a slightly raised fingerboard, and a sound that is distinct from that of the oud.

== History ==
The barbat probably originated in Central Asia. The earliest image of the barbat dates back to the 1st century BC from ancient northern Bactria. While in his book (Les instruments de musique de l’Inde ancienne) musicologist Claudie Marcel-Dubois pointed out a more "clear cut" depiction of the barbat from Gandhara sculpture dated to the 2nd–4th centuries AD, which may well have been introduced by the Kushan aristocracy whose influence is attested in Gandharan art.

The name itself meant short-necked lute in Pahlavi, the language of the Sasanian Empire, through which the instrument came west from Central Asia to West Asia, adopted by the Persians. The barbat (possibly known by example in pre-islamic Yemen as mizhar, kirān, or muwattar, all skin topped versions, like the rud) was used by some Arabs in the sixth century. At the end of the 6th century, a wood topped version of the Persian-styled instrument was constructed by al Nadr, called "ūd", and introduced from Iraq to Mecca. This Persian-style instrument was being played there in the seventh century. Sometime in the seventh century it was modified or "perfected" by Mansour Zalzal, and the two instruments (barbat and "ūd shabbūt") were used side by side into the 10th century, and possibly longer.

The two instruments have been confused by modern scholars looking for examples, and some of the ouds identified may possibly be barbats. Examples of this cited in the Encyclopedia of Islam include a lute in the Cantigas de Santa Maria and the frontispiece from The Life and Times of Ali Ibn ISA by Harold Bowen.

=== Kusana origin of short lutes ===
Laurence Picken in his 1955 article The Origin of the Short Lute laid out an argument for the lute originating in the lands of the Kusana peoples.

He looked at the likely places for the short ovoid lute to originate. He showed that the evidence found by 1955 indicated that China would not likely have had an instrument such as the lute earlier than the 5th century.

He found no evidence of the Sasanian barbad or barbud earlier than the 4th century A.D. The earliest evidence was to be found among the Kusanas. He considered other peoples further west, but only found evidence of long-necked lutes. The only other possibility was among the "Elamic clay figures" from the 8th century B.C. These were discounted, as "no structural detail are visible."

He was careful to point out that his conclusions were based on the evidence which had been unearthed by 1955, from literature and art.

=== Iconographic evidence ===
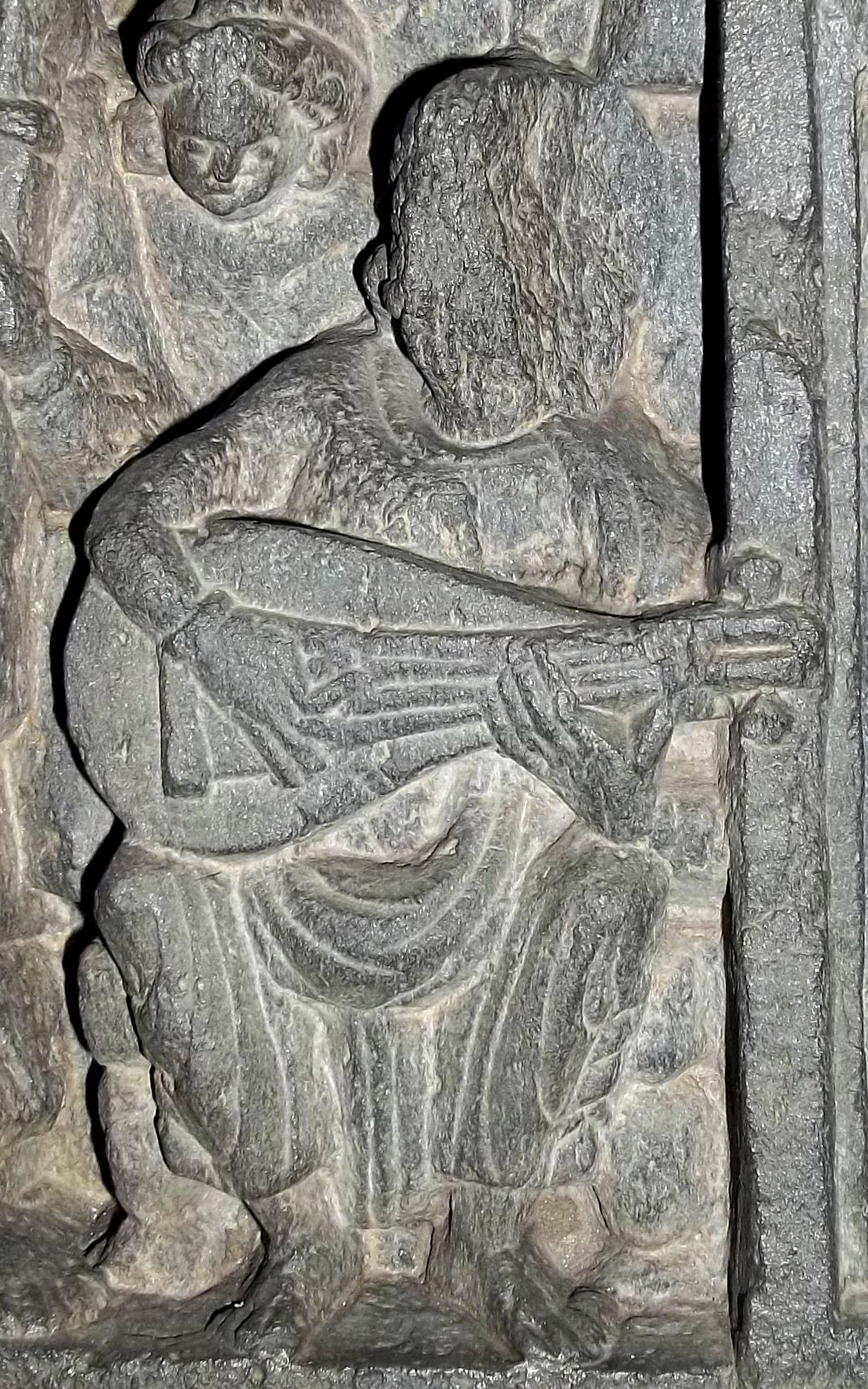
"Siddhartha" playing a lute-type instrument. Gandaran art. Date not given for artwork. The era for grey schist art was 1st–6th centuries A.D.

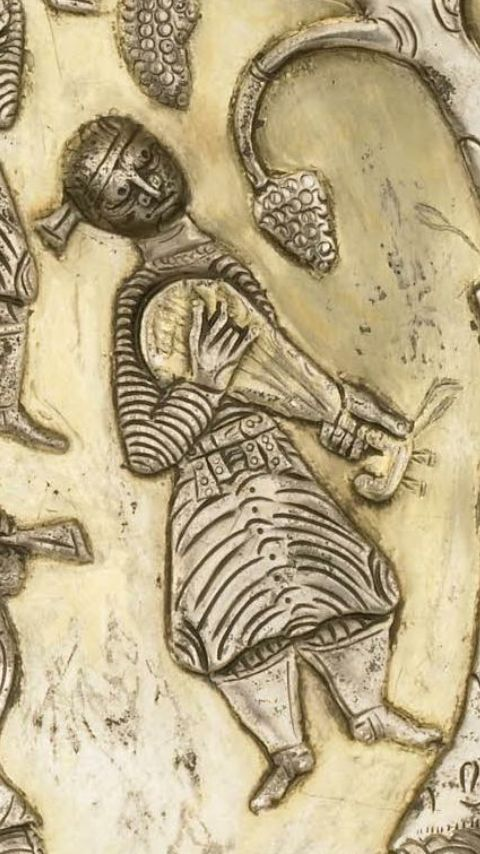
The lute-type instrument from a decorated dish, Sasanian Iran (7th–8th centuries A.D.) was pointed out by Michael Nixon as a possible barbat.

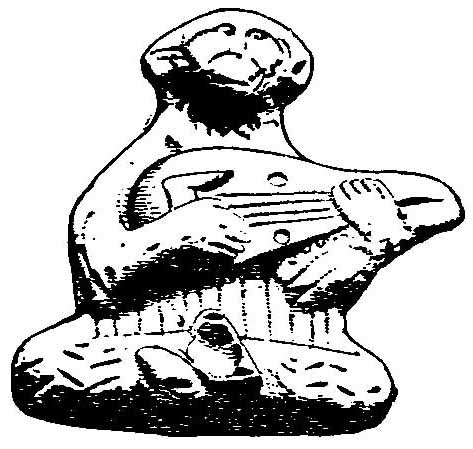
Clay figurine from Kingdom of Khotan, c. 1st–6th centuries A.D., very early image of short necked lute. Has also been called rebab (a skin-topped instrument).

In his paper which summarized what was known about early examples of Asian harps and lutes, focusing on images and literature for his sources, Michael Nixon pointed out that one image of the barbat from Sasanian Iran (estimated origin in his paper 3rd–7th centuries A.D and 7th–8th centuries A.D. by the British Museum) resembled other images of the barbat from Sasanian and Gandharan sources. He said that the instrument itself resembled these and was held in the same manner. The instrument also resembled an image from a door-lintel bas-relief from the Gupta period in Padmavati Pawaya, India.(240–605 A.D.)

The Ganharan image he points to (c. 2nd–4th centuries A.D.) was published in Curt Sachs' book The History of Musical Instruments in 1940. It shows a man holding a lute-style instrument with bottom of the rounded bowl of the instrument held to his chest, the neck of the instrument held down at a approximately 45-degree angle, and the man strumming the instrument near his chest.

Another image from Gandhara from an overlapping time period (100–320 A.D.) is in the collection of the Cleveland Museum of Art. The image shows a similarly shaped instrument, with similar bridge (the bar at the bottom of the instrument's bowl) held and strummed in the same manner. This image, unlike the other two mentioned, shows sound holes, an indication that this instrument had a wooden soundboard and not a skin top.

Jean During, who wrote the 1988 Barbat article used by the Encyclopedia Iranica, cites two images of short lutes as being the oldest currently known. One is in Ḵaḷčayān (Uzbekistan), c. 1st century A.D. The other, "at the moment the oldest evidence of the existence of the barbaṭ," was at Dal’verzin Tepe, c. 1st century B.C.

Another early source of lute images from Central Asia comes from East Kashkadarya, where coroplast statuettes (c. 1st Century B.C. to 1st Century A.D.) from the Kangyui period were found, female lutenists that appear religious, depicting a female goddess playing a lute. The Kangyui Kingdom was in the Kazakhstan and Uzbekistan region from the 2nd century B.C. to the 4th century A.D. The lutes are short lutes, but the detail in the statuettes is low. Whether they are the same as the other short lutes in the area is not clear.

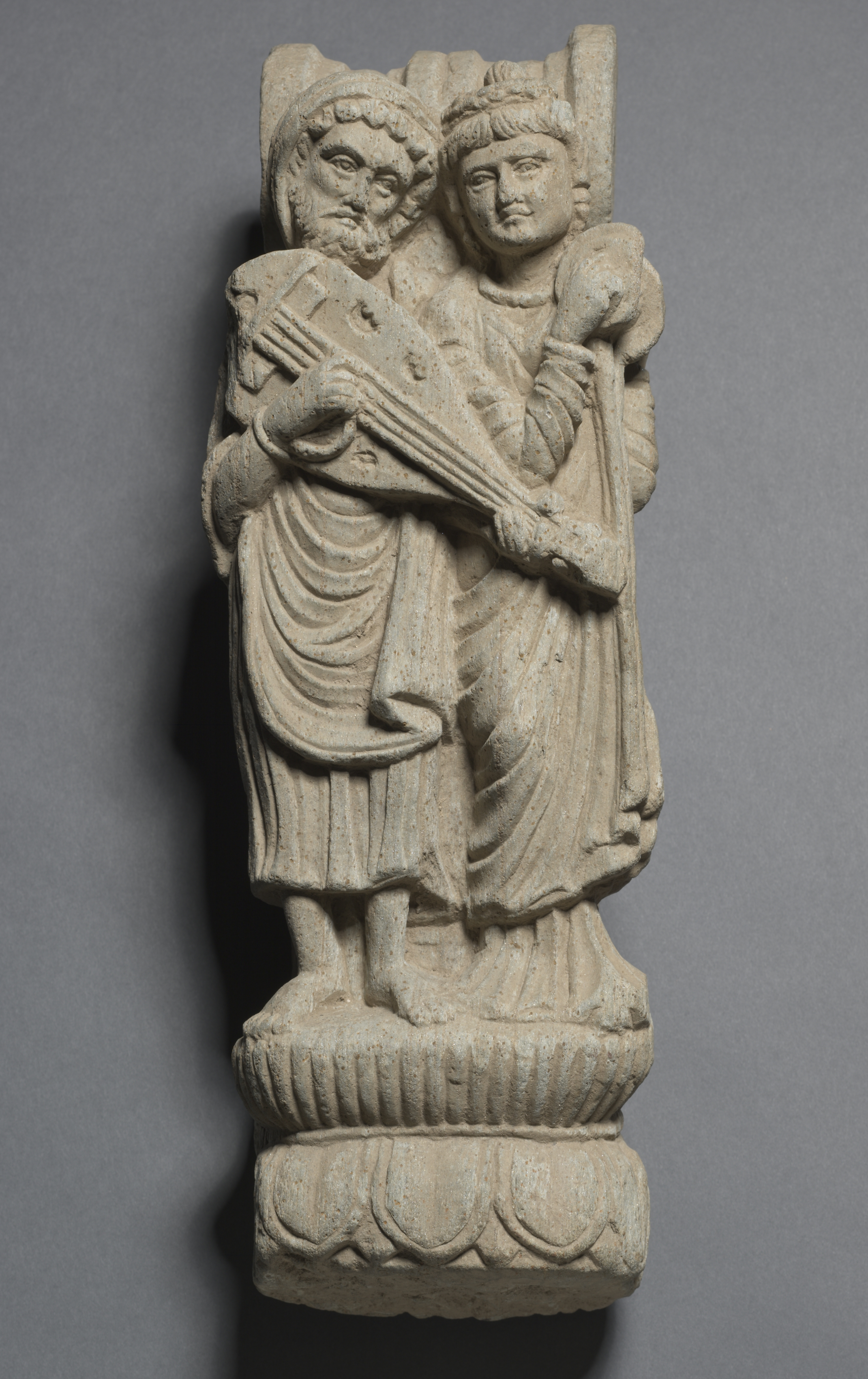
Cleveland Museum of Art, Lute in Pakistan, Gandhara, probably Butkara in Swat, Kushan Period (1st century–320)

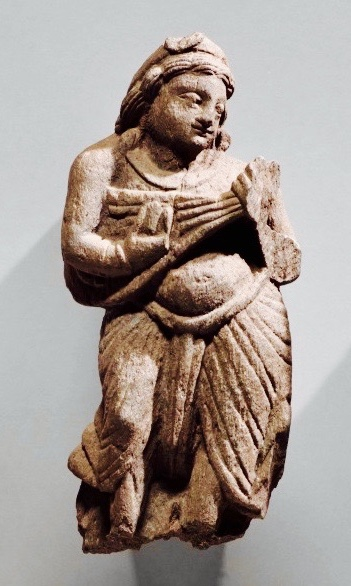
Gandhara Lute, Pakistan, Swat Valley, Gandhara region, 4th–5th century

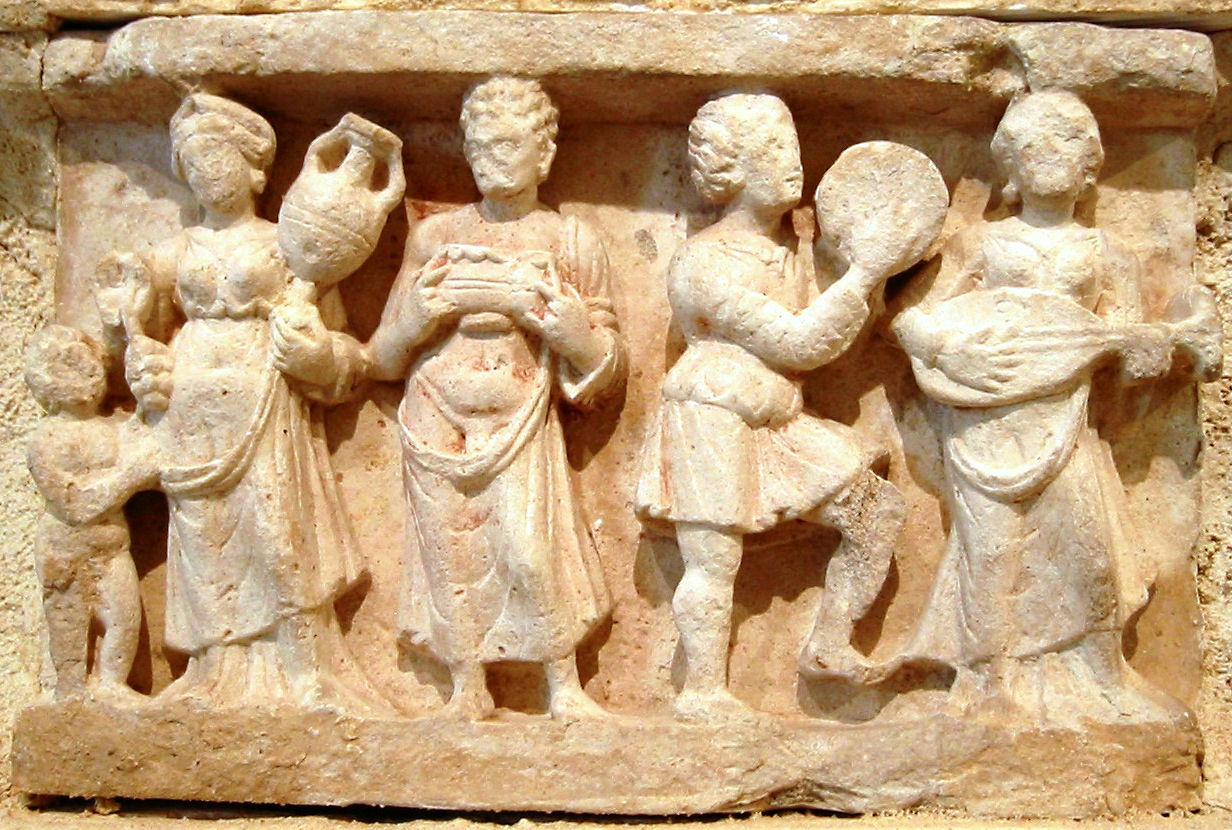
Hellenistic banquet scene from the 1st century AD, Hadda, Gandhara. Short-necked, 2-string lute held by player, far right.

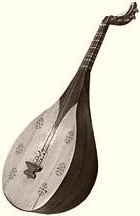
Recreation of a barbat, ca. 1910.

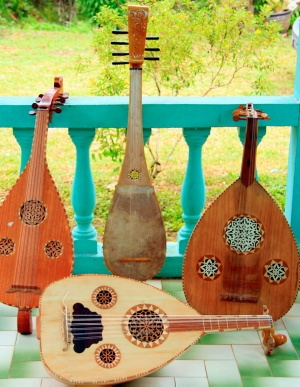
Myanmar. Ouds, gambus and a blending of the two. All originating in the barbat.

== The modern instrument ==
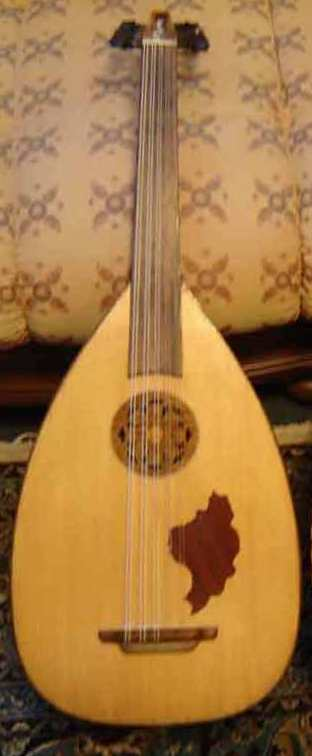
Today's Persian Barbat.

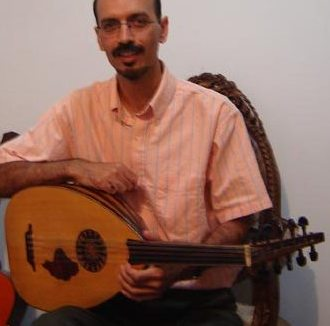
Hossein Behroozinia, an Iranian musician holding a Persian Barbat

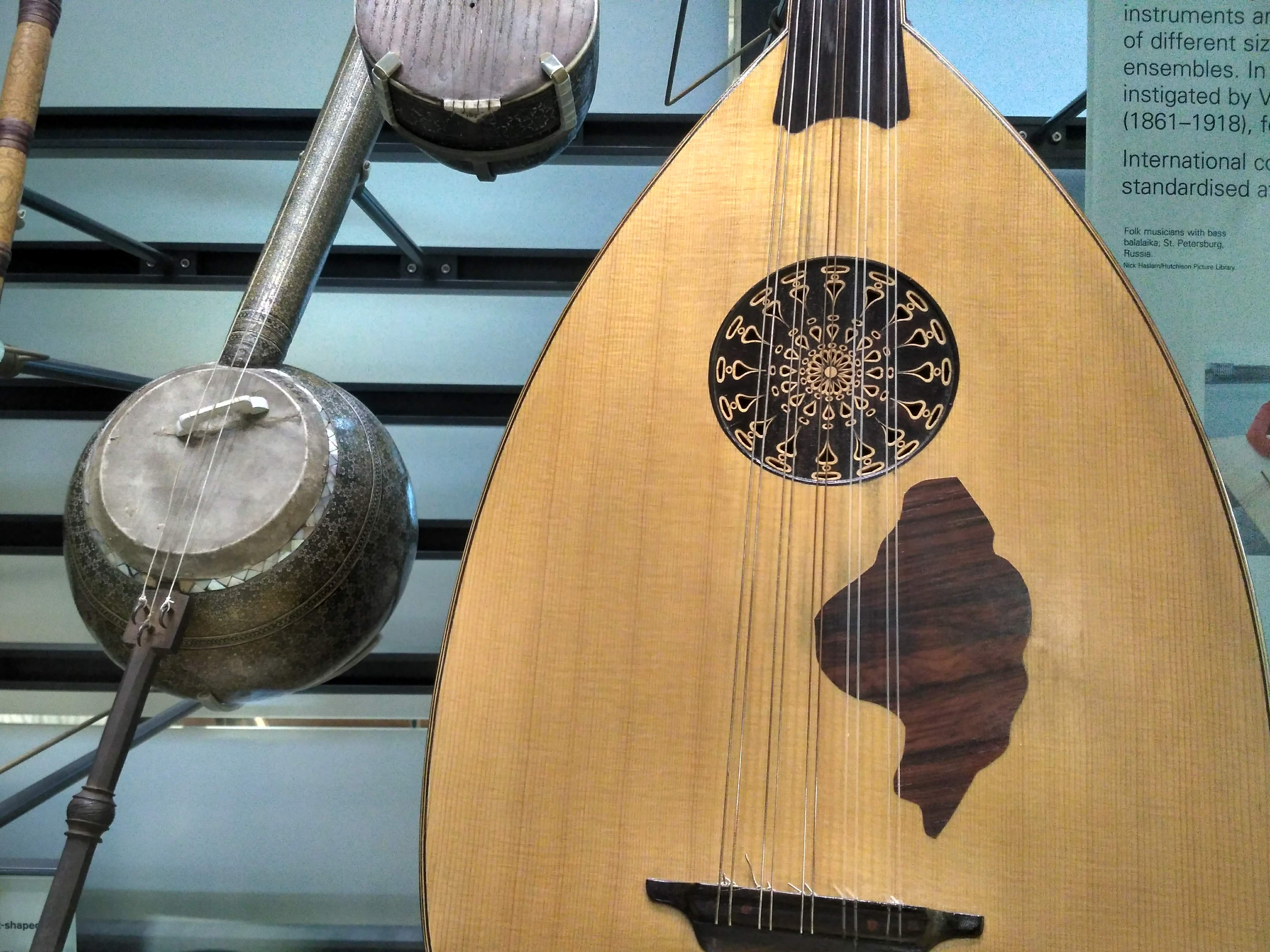
Iranian oud AKA barbat in the Horniman Museum, London, UK.

=== Holding the barbat ===
The barbat is held similar to an oud, but care must be taken to have the face vertical so that it is not visible to the player, and to support the weight with the thigh and right arm so that the left hand is free to move around the fingerboard.

Note the idiosyncratic manner of holding the mizrab (Turkish) or risha (Arabic, lit. "feather") or pick; although it seems awkward it is in reality easier than a conventional flatpick and gives the "right" tonal shading to the plucked note.

In all matters of holding and playing it is recommended that the player use only the muscles needed for any musical task and to relax as much as possible, using only as much force as is necessary. This will allow one to play longer, easier and to put the effort into creativity rather than mechanics. In the past many players sat cross-legged on a rug, but now most perform sitting, often using a classical guitarist's footrest under the right foot to help hold the barbat.

=== Basic fingering ===
Two methods of left hand fingering are in current usage. The older, more traditional Classical Arabic approach uses all four fingers for stopping the strings, one for each semitone much as a guitarist; alternatively, some play with a style more akin to baglama (or saz) or sitar technique, using mainly the first and second fingers, with less use of the third and little use of the fourth fingers.

The violinist Hakki Obadia taught a mixed fingering system that uses the first finger for several notes and the second finger for another notes but not on all strings. The third finger is used too but not the fourth.

Another important facet of left hand technique is the employment of the fingernail to help stop the string, giving a clearer tone and more pronounced ornaments than use of the fleshy tips alone. This is common to several other fretless instrument, among them the sarod, shamisen and sanxian.

The Iranian barbat and oud player Mansour Nariman used only the first three fingers of the left hand. His student Hossein Behroozinia disagreed with this approach and decided to use all four fingers of the left hand. Today, most professional barbat and oud players use their four fingers.

=== Right hand-the mizrab or risha ===
As mentioned the right hand employs a special method for holding the quill inspired pick called risha in Arabic and mizrab in Turkish. The long flexible pick puts the wrist at a particular angle and adds a certain tonal color to the sound. The traditional material was an eagle quill, but this is not practical; plastic makes a more durable and standard material for the risha. Players have used things like collar stays, plastic pieces from hardware stores, cut-up plastic bottles ( this worked better with the old heavyweight containers), and of course the Turkish manufactured models. These come in a thin, more-or-less pointed tip style made of lighter gauge translucent plastic and a round tip model made of heavier white opaque stock. The thinner ones are lovely sounding and play very delicately with subtle nuances; the heavier ones play very loud.

Variations can be obtained by cutting a new tip on the thinner ones a bit further back where the plastic is a little thicker, adding volume to the attack. The rounded ones can be cut to a pointer shape and thinned a fraction with fine sandpaper adding nuance to the heavier attack produced by this pick. Both kinds are made double-ended from the factory, so one end can be left original and the other end customized, the player using the appropriate end for the musical need.

=== Body ===
The barbat's body contains three major parts:

- Resonating body: It is like a pear and it is the biggest resonating body in comparison with other bodies. There are three sound holes and lattices on its body, one bigger than two others.
- Fingerboard: Without frets (or fretless), and the neck. Some earlier illustrations show frets arranged to include microtones.
- Bent-back pegbox: There is a great angle between the fingerboard/neck and pegbox. This is very important, it has several tuning pegs and if the bent-back pegbox is weak, the instrument won’t be tuned very well.

==== Composition ====
Traditional materials of the barbat are:

- Resonating body: Walnut tree or maple;
- String fastener or bridge: Boxwood ;
- Top sheet: Deal ;
- Neck: Walnut;
- Nut: Bone or plastic;
- Pegbox: Walnut;
- Pegs: Walnut or ebony;
- Lattices of hole: Walnut.

=== How to make a barbat's resonating body ===
There are two traditional methods:

Carved body: For this a log is cut in two pieces. On one a silhouette of the body is drawn, then the half log would be carved and scraped by tools from the inside and outside. Then it will be left to be dried.

Constructed body: In this method sections of walnut or mulberry wood are cut and boiled in hot water. These sections or ribs should have the thickness around 2 –3 mm. When they are flexible they are stressed on a crescent shaped mold or former. After drying, they will be glued and joined to each other. Then the neck and the top plate or belly will be joined to complete the structure.

== See also ==
- Ancient music
- Music of Iran
