= Pierre Cormon =

Swiss writer, born 1965

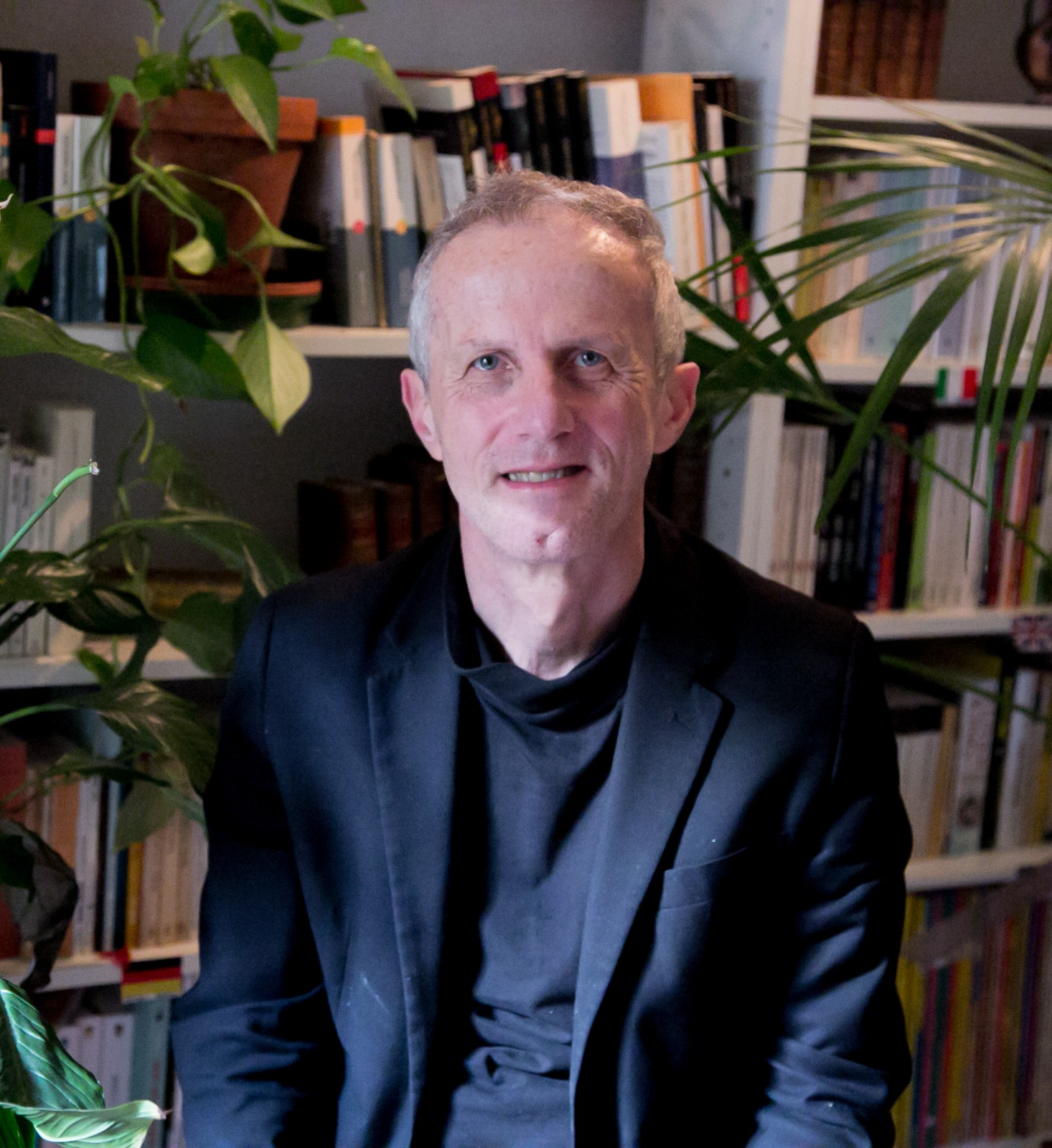
Pierre Cormon at home in 2024

Pierre Cormon, born 1965 in Ambilly, France, is a Swiss writer and has published books in French, Brazilian Portuguese and English, including Swiss Politics for Complete Beginners.

== Biography ==
He began his career as a journalist with Le Nouveau Quotidien in 1992, then worked as a delegate for the International Committee of the Red Cross in Gaza, Yemen and Rwanda between 1993 and 1996. He resumed his career as a journalist with the Journal de Genève, La Liberté and Entreprise romande. At the same time, between 2000 and 2005, he studied the oud (oriental lute) at the Arabic Oud House in Cairo, under the guidance of the Iraqi master Naseer Shamma. He drew on this experience in his novel Le Traître, which tells the story of a Swiss living in Cairo who becomes embroiled in the Israeli-Palestinian conflict. He is also the author of a book explaining the Swiss political system to foreigners and of a novel written directly in Brazilian Portuguese, set during Rio Carnival.

== Works ==
- Le Génie de l’aubergine, Atelier du poisson soluble, 1997, ISBN 9782950456854
- Les Mémoires de Satan, Atelier du poisson soluble, 2005, ISBN 9782913741331
- Le Traître, Slatkine, 2010, ISBN 9782832103913
- Swiss Politics for Complete Beginners, Éditions Slatkine, 2014, ISBN 9782832106075
  - La politique Suisse pour les débutants, Éditions Slatkine, 2016, ISBN 9782832107539
- O Grande Dia, Quixote + Do, 2024, ISBN 978-8566256918
