= Claudie =

Claudie is a given name. Notable people with the name include:

- Claudie Blakley (born 1974), English actress
- Claudie Cuvelier (born 1943), French athlete
- Claudie Haigneré (born 1957), French doctor, politician, and former astronaut
- Claudie Marcel-Dubois (1913–1989), French ethnomusicologist
- Claudie Minor, former tackle in the National Football League
- "Claudie" a song by UK rock band Status Quo which appears on their 1973 album Hello!
