= Khyam Allami =

British-based musician and musicologist (born 1981)

Khyam Allami (Arabic: خيام اللامي; born 1981 in Damascus, Syria) is a British-based musician and musicologist of Iraqi descent. He is best known as a contemporary player of the Arabic oud lute (working both with traditional Arabic repertoire and with contemporary compositions and cross-disciplinary music) and has also written about and lectured on Arabic music.

Allami has studied oud and composition with a variety of musicians and composers from the Arab world, including Ehsan Emam, Naseer Shamma, Abdo Dagher, Hazem Shaheen and Mehmet Bitmez. His most prominent public appearance to date has been at the 2010 Proms concerts in London. He performed on 9 August 2010 as part of Prom 33: BBC Radio 3 World Routes Academy alongside one of his mentors, Iraqi guitarist and singer Ilham Al Madfai. He also currently performs and promotes oud-based concerts in London under the title of Ud and Elsewhere, in which he collaborates with other musicians from diverse backgrounds.

Allami has also worked within the rock music field as a drummer and bass guitarist, having played for bands including Knifeworld, Ursa, Art of Burning Water and Gales.

== Biography and career ==
=== Background and early life ===
Khyam Allami was born into an Iraqi family in Damascus, Syria, in 1981. Although his parents were not actively musical, he grew up surrounded by Arabic music (as well as music from other cultures). From the age of seven he learned accordion and violin, and at the age of eight played the role of a young violinist in Rimon Butrus’s 1991 film Al-Tahaleb. The Allami family relocated to London, UK, when Khyam was nine years old.

=== Musical activity before 2003 (alternative rock) ===
In his teenage years, Allami rejected his original Iraqi background. He abandoned his former instruments, stopped speaking Arabic and immersed himself in Western rock (in particular, bands such as Soundgarden, Melvins, Killing Joke, Tool, Aqua, Blink 182 and The Waterboys. During this period he also learned how to play guitar, bass guitar and drums.

In 1996 Allami joined the London based hardcore punk band Ursa as drummer (alongside singer/guitarist Jodie Cox, bass player Paul Arnold and guitarist Wayne Pennell). Ursa worked together for four years and released one single, "Copper Eight" (on Schism Records) as well as various appearances on indie rock compilations. In their last year of existence, Ursa met and worked with The Monsoon Bassoon (whose Iranian-born guitarist Kavus Torabi would become one of Allami’s future collaborators). Following the amicable split of Ursa in 2000, Allami became the bass guitarist and occasional vocalist for the gothic punk/sludge metal band Art of Burning Water (with guitarist/vocalist Geith Al-Robei and drummer Michael Frances McKenna).

"I was neck-deep in western rock, but "eastern"-sounding melodies always got to me. In particular, the soaring majestic violin solo of Aboud Abdel Al on Killing Joke's song "Communion". It never failed to unleash a torrent of butterflies in my stomach – the kind of deep, nervous, painful longing you only feel when you are stupidly in love with a girl you cannot have. Why did that violin make me feel that way? And more importantly, how do you play a melody like that?"

— Khyam Allami on reconnecting with his musical roots.

However, Allami had remained interested in the music of the Middle East, which had continued to inspire him throughout his time in rock bands. In 2002, he began to experiment with playing the oud, but his initial attempts were unsuccessful and he gave up after a few weeks.

=== Musical activity since 2003 (oud player) ===
A drastic change in Allami’s musical career was precipitated by the invasion of Iraq in 2003. Despite never having been to Iraq himself (he would later describe it as "a land I had never seen, air I have never breathed, people I hardly knew") Allami found that the invasion forced him to reappraise and revive his own cultural roots. Pained and shaken by events ("Iraq burned and I couldn't do a single thing about it") he opted to demonstrate solidarity by making a serious attempt to take up oud playing and began studies with the London-based Iraqi 'ud maestro Ehsan Emam. In March 2004 Allami bought his own oud and decided to dedicate his life to the instrument and to its music, quitting Art of Burning Water in order to do so.

In addition to his studies with Emam, Allami took an Ethnomusicology course at the University of London’s School of Oriental and African Studies (SOAS), graduating in 2008 with a BA Honours degree. This in turn led to a scholarship to continue his studies for a master's degree in Music Performance as Research, specialising in the Iraqi oud school and its antecedents. He began playing concerts in London and elsewhere as part of this work. Performances during this period included a concert in June 2008 with the Sabina Rakcheyeva Trio in Baku, Azerbaijan (broadcast on the national Azeri television station AZTV) and a solo oud session for BBC Radio 3’s World Routes programme in August 2008.

In 2009, Allami studied at Beit al-‘Ud al- ‘Arabi in Cairo with another Iraqi oud master, Naseer Shamma (on a research grant from the British Institute for the Study of Iraq). He also studied composition with Abdo Dagher (basing the work on Dagher’s own compositions) and Egyptian oud repertoire and technique with Hazem Shaheen. In December 2009 he began working with the Royal Shakespeare Company, providing music for the two-month run of the play Arabian Nights at the Courtyard Theatre in Stratford-Upon-Avon.

In April 2010, Allami studied Turkish oud with Mehmet Bitmez in Istanbul. During the same year, he gained mentorship from BBC Radio 3's World Routes Academy program, travelling to the Middle East for three weeks to work with various musicians including the renowned Iraqi singer/guitarist Ilham Al Madfai. This culminated, in August 2010, with Allami performing in front of an audience of thousands at the 2010 Proms, as part of a double bill with Ilham al-Madfai which was also broadcast live on BBC Radio 3. Allami based his own performance on repertoire from the Iraqi maqam, and duetted with al-Madfai on a number of songs.

=== Work as composer ===
In addition to his work on maintaining the existing oud repertoire, Allami is an active composer. He has stated that in addition to being influenced by Arabic composers such as Hossein Alizade, Abdo Dagher and Naseer Shamma he draws inspiration from contemporary classical and rock composers and musicians including Frank Zappa, King Crimson, Secret Chiefs 3, Philip Glass, Jaz Coleman and others.

=== Work as promoter and concert host ===
Allami currently hosts an ongoing concert series in small venues in London, called "'Ud and Elsewhere". These concert feature solo performances by Allami as well as collaborative performances from musicians of various cultures.

=== Ongoing work as rock musician (2008 onwards) ===
Since graduating from SOAS, Allami has also resumed his work as occasional rock musician. He has played drums for two experimental rock bands - Knifeworld (led by Kavus Torabi) and Gales (an experimental rock quartet featuring ex-Foe guitarist Jason Carty (who was also Allami's replacement in Art of Burning Water).

== See also ==
- List of oud players
- List of British Iraqis
