= Tariq Al Menhali =

Emirati singer

Tariq Al Menhali طارق المنهالي
- Also known as: Sot Al Asala (The voice of originality)
- Born: December 10, 1985 (age 40); Al Ain, Emirate of Abu Dhabi
- Genres: Arabic music, Khaliji
- Occupations: Singer, composer
- Years active: 2014–present

Tariq Al Menhali (Arabic: طارق المنهالي) is an Emirati singer.

== Early life ==
He was born in the city of Al Ain, and when the artist Tariq reached the age of six, he moved with his family to the capital Abu Dhabi. Al Menhali is the first UAE academic artist who graduated from the Arab Oud House Academy.

== Discography ==
=== Singles ===
- homeland
- I have an honest
- Strange time
- The joy of the holiday
- Night and Promise
- A thousand love
- Lily is like lilac
- Tolerance year
- Auja
- Ramadan
- Allied Emirates
- Hadi
- I am your intruder
- Upscale
- Hasayef
- I am worried about you
