= Dina El Wedidi =

Egyptian musical artist

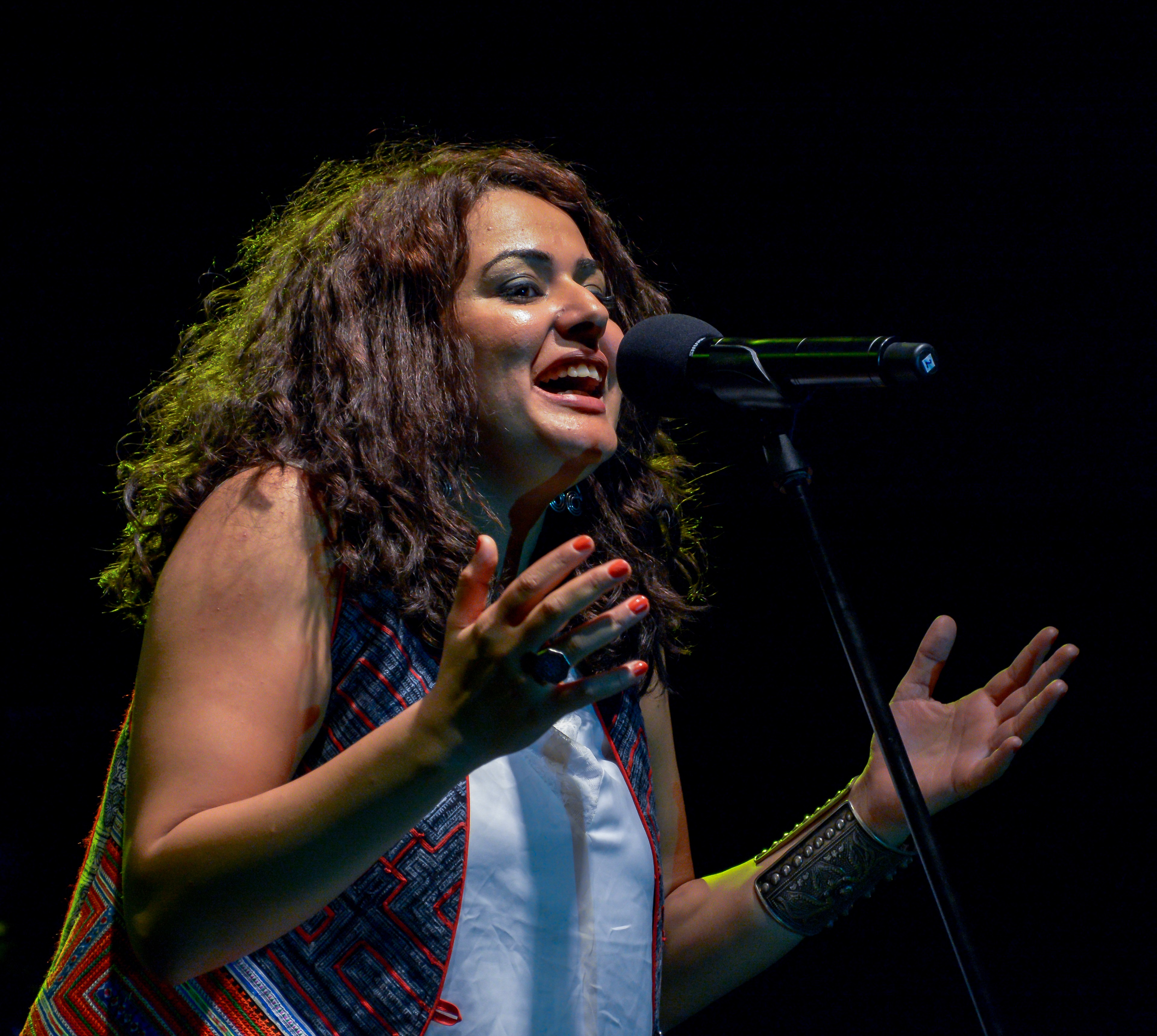
- Dina El Wedidi in El-azhar Park 25.6.2015

Background information
- Birth name: Dina El Wedidi
- Origin: Giza, Egypt
- Genres: Folk, Fusion, Electroacoustic music, Contemporary music, Jazz
- Occupation(s): Singer, Composer, Producer
- Years active: 2011–present
- Website: dinaelwedidi.com

Dina El Wedidi (Arabic: دينا الوديدي), is an Egyptian singer, composer, guitarist, music producer, and storyteller. Dina has been known as the lead performer of an ensemble of musicians who have performed extensively in the past 2 years, fusing local and global styles of music.

== Early life ==
Wedidi was born and raised in Giza, Egypt. She studied Oriental Literature at Cairo University, where she graduated in 2008, then spent some time working as a translator and sometimes a tour guide in Egypt.

Wedidi discovered her passion for music after joining El Warsha Theater Troupe in 2008, where she learned to sing a wide variety of traditional genres with the help of her tutor Maged Soliman. She then decided to leave El Warsha and began to explore the full potential of her voice. She also participated in many workshops with independent musicians both in Egypt and beyond, including Grammy award-winning Egyptian musician Fathy Salama and singer-songwriter Kamilya Jubran.

== Musical career ==
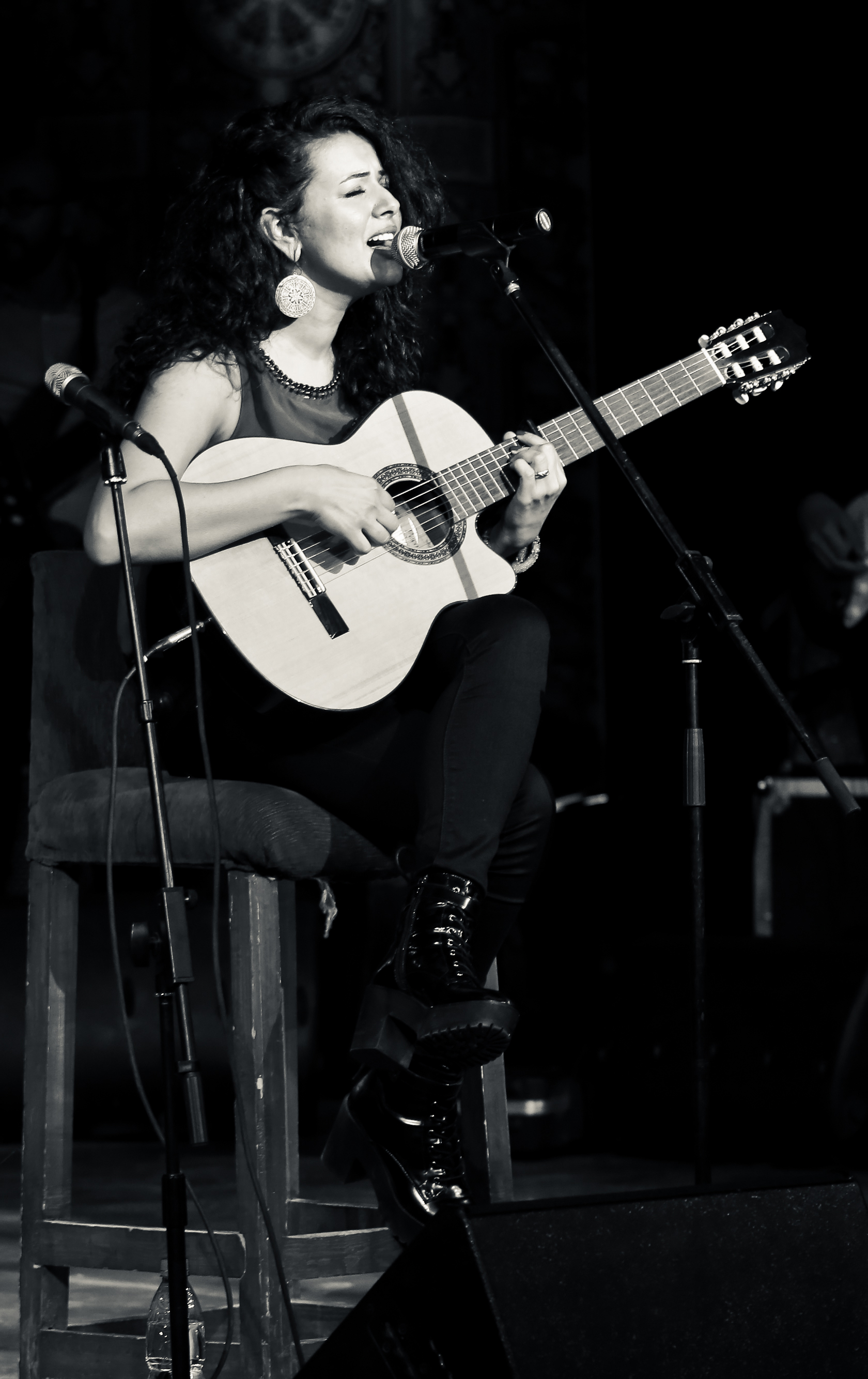
Dina El Wedidi playing Guitar

Beginning 2011, Wedidi had quit El-Wersha and founded her own music group of six members besides her. Coincidentally, the Egyptian Revolution of 2011 broke out and El Wedidi took part in a modern Operetta, Khalina Nehlam ('Let's Dream'), with Egyptian band Masar Egbari, Tamer Shalaby, and Tunisian singers Mahdi Rabeh, Anis Dridi and Mohamed Bin Jemaa. The song was a great hit, capturing the Arab Spring of 2011.

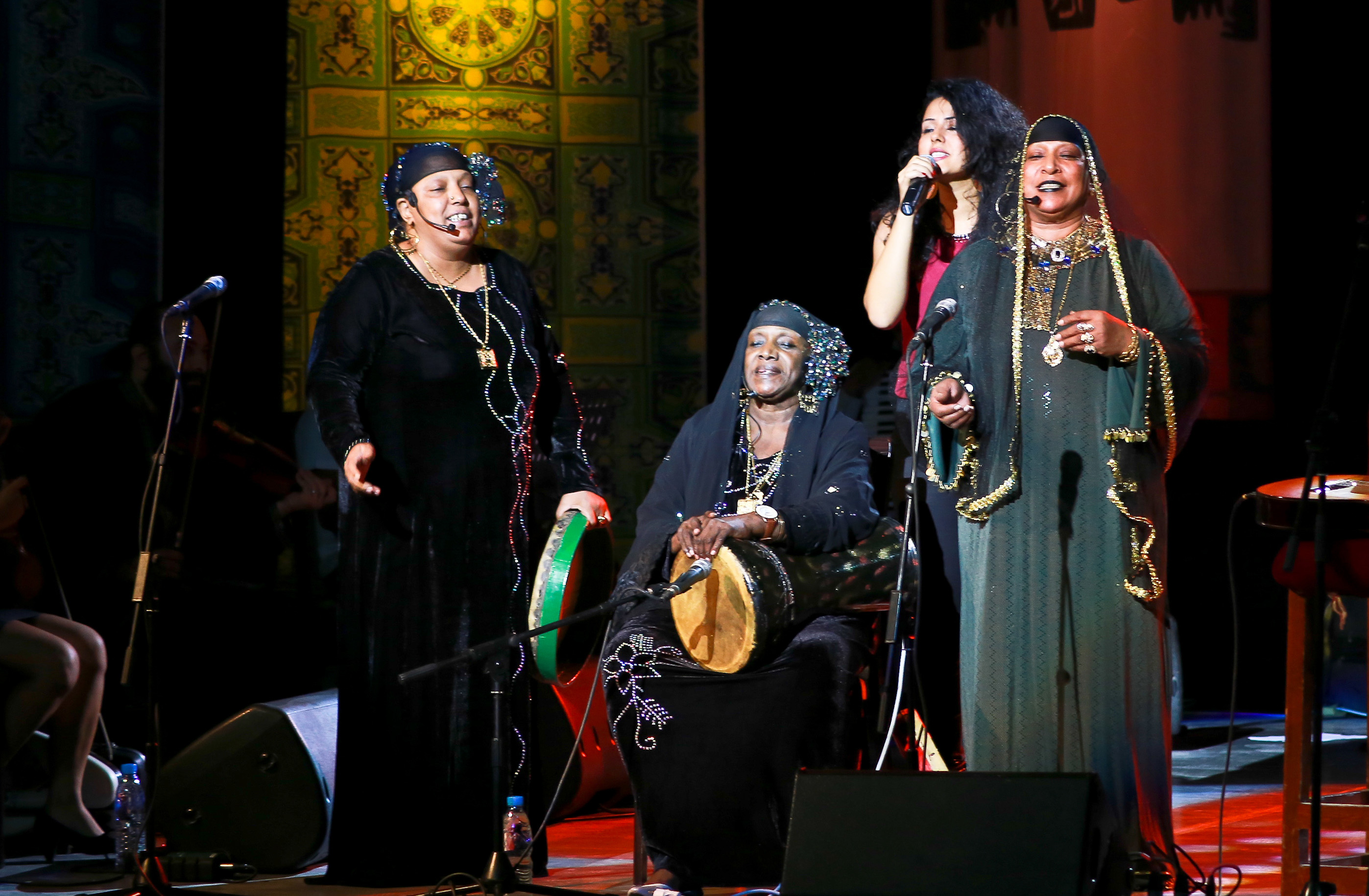
Dina El Wedidi concert at Opera Damanhour 2014

=== Gilberto Gil mentorship ===
In 2012 Wedidi was selected by Gilberto Gil and the Rolex Mentor and Protégé Arts Initiative as a protégé, which allowed her to be mentored by the great Brazilian music icon. The two performed together at Back2Black, part of the London 2012 Festival. They later met for musical events and conversations in Switzerland, the United States, Brazil and Egypt. When Gil was asked about Dina, he answered:

Talent she has, commitment she has, dedication and the capacity to work hard, Dina has all that. And with her musicians, she’s open, cooperative and democratic. Her music is so varied, she has a kind of multifaceted personality, working with change. Every few months, like a different person, she brings new ideas. At her age, when you’re curious, that’s what happens, you’re finding a path to follow. It’s an amazing thing – a year ago, she was singing with local bands in Cairo’s Tahrir Square during the struggle, and then performing with me, in London, an appropriately bicultural song, ‘Egyptian Bossa Nova’. The mentoring was to give her opportunities to follow the way we work, how we prepare our songs, our records, our concerts, how we travel and choose audiences, and why we come to Europe and go to Africa. Dina has a great artistic personality; she’s been tailored by life to be an artist. She’s already a new-born star.

— Gilberto Gil

=== Nile Project ===
In 2013 Wedidi took a part in “the Nile Project” which is a musical and environmental initiative that brings together musicians and thinkers from all over the Nile Valley, Dina participated with her song "Ya Ganouby" (Egyptian Arabic: ياجنوبي; translation: "Oh My South") in which Wedidi sings about her regret for being disconnected from her south (a metaphor for the Nile), and her longing for it to become a more integral part of her life. The song is a musical expression of the collective's mission, to come together and heal the broken relationships within their cultural and natural environments.

=== Turning Back ===
Turning Back is the 2014 debut album from Egyptian musician Dina El Wedidi. which she labelled as New Arab Folk. Dina was presenting her work not only as a singer but also as a composer. Dina's melodies, especially in this album, are known for their complex rhythms and coherent tones, the most famous of which is the song In Wonderland (Fi Belad El Agayeb) and The Grief Of The South (Hozn El Ganoub). El Wedidi featured guest performances by Mazaher and her Mentor Gilberto Gil. The album was produced by the bassist Miles Jay and the violinist Nancy Mounir. The album track list a number of sociopolitical themes, some of which are personal, and others more about love-struggles. Being a Cairo-based musician, El Wedidi finds inspirations Egypt’ streets, which she later quotes in her songs through lyrics and compositions.

=== Slumber ===
In 2018 Wedidi Released her album Slumber which means in Arabic Manam which is an experimental electronic album., produced from layers of processed train sounds, the voices of people, and all that can be used within the train over which she sings.

== Discography ==
=== Studio albums ===
- Songs from a Stolen Spring (compilation) (2014)
- Turning Back (تدورو ترجع" (2014"
- Slumber (منام" (2018"

Collaborations

- (Hayamatni) with the Tunisian Singer Ghaliya Benali 2015
- (El Ors) with The Egyptian Singer Maryam Saleh 2013
- (El Liel) with The Brazilian Singer Gilberto Gil 2014
- (Sodassi Project) with Kamilya Jubran 2018
- (Allah Baa’y) With Alsarah 2015
- (Dil Mahbouby) with Mohamed abozekry
- (Khalina Nehlem) with Massar Egbary
- (Complete) with the producer Elbuho
