= Turning Back =

Studio album by Dina El Wedidi
- Released: 14 October 2014
- Recorded: Cairo, Norway, Rio de Janeiro
- Genre: Folk music, Fusion
- Label: Kirkelig Kulturverksted
- Producer: Miles Jay & Nancy Mounir

Turning Back is the 2014 debut album by Egyptian musician Dina El Wedidi. The album features guest performances by Mazaher and Gilberto Gil. It received distribution from Kirkelig Kulturverksted and Valley Entertainment.

== Track listing ==
No.	Title	Guest performer(s)	Length
1.	"In Wonderland (Fi Belad El Agayeb)"		5:00
2.	"Sin (El Haram)"		3:47
3.	"Circles (Dawayer)"	Mazaher	4:50
4.	"Homeland (Ya Belad)"		4:00
5.	"El Sira"		6:44
6.	"Trees Address Me (Yohadethoni El Shagar)"		3:46
7.	"The Night (El Liel)"	Gilberto Gil	5:02
8.	"The Grief Of The South (Hozn El Ganoub)"		5:08
9.	"Turning Back (Tedawar W'tergaa)"		3:35
10.	"The Ardor Of Love (Kotr El Wagaa)"		3:35
11.	"Stillness (Sokoun)"		3:15
