= Ratebeh Neyshabouri =

Iranian poet, singer and musician (872-917)

Ratebh Nishaburi
- Born: 872 Nishapur
- Died: 917
- Occupation: poet, musician (Barbat), singer

Ratebeh Neyshabouri (872 – 917) was a poet, musician (Barbat), singer and organist of Tahirid dynasty.
