= Nancy Mounir =

Egyptian contemporary musician

Nancy Mounir (Arabic: نانسي منير) is an Egyptian independent musician, producer and violin player. After having performed with other musical artists in Egypt, she became known for the research and recording for her 2022 debut album Nozhet El Nofous (Promenade of Souls), where she blended her own music with historical recordings of popular female singers of the 1920s music scene in Cairo.

== Life and work ==
Born in the Mediterranean metropolis Alexandria, Mounir later moved to Egypt's capital city Cairo. Apart from the violin, she plays several other instruments and her music spans different genres, ranging from popular and classical Arabic music to contemporary heavy metal genres and electronic performances. In an in-depth review of her debut album, she was called "a veteran of the independent music scene in Egypt." Apart from her own musical performances, she has composed and arranged music for films and theatre plays. Among her collaborations with other musical artists, Mounir was one of the members of the Egyptian metal band Massive Scar Era and co-produced Dina El Wedidi's album Turning back.

For her debut album Nozhet El Nofous (نزهة النفوس – Promenade of Souls), released in 2022, Mounir spent years of research on biographies and music of popular female Egyptian singers in the 1920s such as Mounira El Mahdeya, Hayat Sabri and Fatma Serry, who were popular Egyptian musical stars before the era of Umm Kulthum. Apart from these artists' musical careers, Mounir was interested in their musical tuning systems, which have not been part of the dominant musical scales in the Arabic mainstream music since the 1930s.

Arabic microtonal scales or maqamat are a mainly melodic system of tonal-spatial rather than rhythmic structure. According to Mounir, the gender and artistic choices were reasons why such female singers were excluded from the influential 1932 Congress of Arab Music in Cairo. Attended by prominent Arab and Western musicians and musicologists, this congress lead to a standardisation of Arabic music under the influence of Western musical traditions, where microtones were integrated into their nearest quarter tone. Qualifying these singers as "musical rebels", Mounir aimed to study their "passions, desires and afterlives in contemporary Egyptian society". Further, she said "Microtones are used in rituals all over the world. I believe that we were born to sing in microtones. Every ethnicity develops them in their own logic and through different trajectories."

During the production of her album, Mounir used archival materials and recordings of various singers and composed her own music "to reconstruct a non-existent memory." Thus, Nozhet El Nofous became a "musical dialogue" between Mounir’s own arrangements and the historical musicians whom she called “the ghosts”, "exploring their legacies a century onwards."

== Reception ==
In October 2021, Nozhet El Nofous was premiered at Cairo's Institute of Arab Music, the same place where the Congress had been held in 1932, "thus reviving these singers’ voices where they were once excluded and erased."

NPR Music in the US selected Nozhet El Nofous as one of the 11 best experimental albums of 2022. Under the English title Those who were not invited, Mounir and fellow international musicians were invited to present the music and historical film sequences of Nozhet El Nofous as a video performance at the Berlin Jazz Festival 2022.
