= Mohamed Abozekry =

Franco-Egyptian instrumental music band

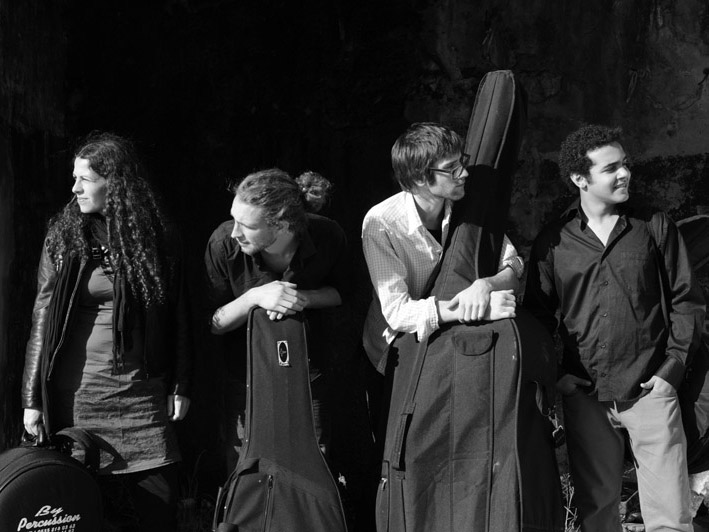
- Mohamed Abozekry & Heejaz (from left to right: Anne Laure Bourget, Guillaume Hogan, Hugo Reydet et Mohamed Abozekry)

Background information
- Origin: Egypt/France
- Genres: Instrumental, world music
- Years active: 2010–present
- Label: Rue Stendhal/Celluloïd
- Members: Mohamed Abozekry; Guillaume Hogan; Anne Laure Bourget; Hugo Reydet
- Website: www.abozekryheejaz.com

Mohamed Abozekry is a Franco-Egyptian musician. He formed several groups, including Heejaz or the Mohamed Abozekry Sextet.

Mohamed Abozekry received the first prize at the international Oud competition in Damascus in 2009. In 2010 he formed the quartet Heejaz which also includes Guillaume Hogan (guitar), Anne Laure Bourget (percussion) and Hugo Reydet (double bass).

== History ==
=== The beginnings and the release of the first album ===
Mohamed Abozekry entered the Arabic Oud House in Cairo at a very early age and received his teaching from Naseer Shamma. At the age of fifteen, he became the youngest professor of Oud in the Arab world.

On 29 August 2007, he met Guillaume Hogan during a concert in Cairo. This latter convinced him to continue his musical studies in France where he will enroll in the University of Lyon II in August 2009. Over this period, Mohamed Abozekry composed jazz and blues-inspired music tracks. In 2010, he drew upon some friends from Lyon to join his band. Together they will form the “Heejaz” ". With their unique musical styles, each member of the band has contributed to the singular compositions that define their genre.

In 2011, the band made several tours in France and abroad such as a 10-day road trip across South America. They also performed several concerts in Egypt, Pakistan, Iraq and the United Arab Emirates.

Chaos is the debut album by Mohamed Abozekry & Heejaz. Released on the 25th of March 2013, it refers to the torment and pain of a young musician who is helplessly watching as his country is going through a revolution. Therefore, every track is told as a story with each event and twist setting the pace and the rhythm of the composition. The track “25 janvier”, initially destined to be included in the album and then eventually withdrawn, pays tribute to the victims of the Egyptian revolution. It is available for free downloading on their official website.
