= Hossein Behroozinia =

Iranian barbat and oud player

Hossein Behroozinia حسین بهروزی‌نیا
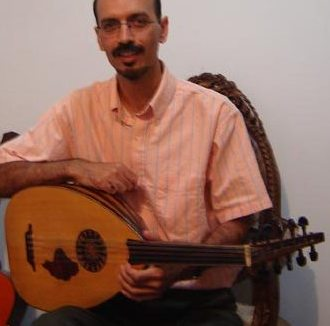
- Behroozinia hossein

Background information
- Born: 11 June 1962 (age 62); Tehran, Iran
- Genres: Persian traditional music
- Occupation(s): Composer, instrumentalist
- Instrument(s): Barbat, oud, radif
- Years active: 1987–present
- Website: www.behroozinia.com

Hossein Behroozinia (Persian: حسین بهروزی‌نیا; born 1962 in Tehran) is an Iranian barbat and oud player.

Behroozinia was a student at the Tehran Conservatory of Music, where he studied oud, tar, setar, tonbak, and daf. He studied oud under the supervision of Mansour Nariman, and he learned the radif under the supervision of Mohammad Reza Lotfi.

He was eventually appointed to be the music director of Ensemble Khaleghi, as well as the director of music education at the Center of the Preservation Persian music. In 2003, the Ministry of Culture of Iran decorated him with the "First Order of Arts", its highest honor.

Behroozinia's 2006 album, From Stone to Diamond, placed second in the Middle Eastern Album category at the Just Plain Folks Music Awards (JPF).

== Discography ==
- Barbat (1987)
- Kohestan: Selected Fokloric Melodies of Iran
- Yadestan
- Vajd / Midnight Sun
- Az sang ta almas / From Stone to Diamond (2006)
- A Call Beneath the Ashes
