= Omer Faruk Tekbilek =

Turkish musician and composer (born 1951)

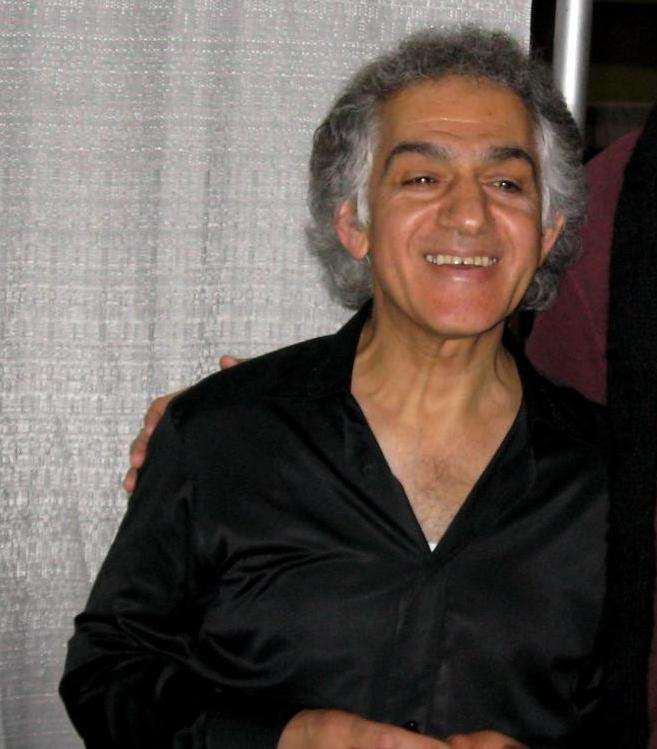

Background information
- Born: Ömer Faruk Tekbilek; 1951 (age 73–74); Adana, Turkey
- Occupations: Instrumentalist, composer
- Instruments: Ney, kaval, zurna, oud, bağlama
- Website: www.omarfaruktekbilek.com

Omer Faruk Tekbilek (Turkish: Ömer Faruk Tekbilek, born 1951) is a Turkish musician and composer who plays a wide range of wind, string, percussion, and electronic instruments. He has developed a style that builds on traditional Sufi music while incorporating inspiration from ambient electronic musicians, most notably Brian Keane. He is best known for his performances with the flute-like ney, but also plays the piccolo-like kaval, and the double-reed zurna. Among stringed instruments, he plays the oud and the bağlama.

== Projects with other musicians ==
In August 2011 the album "Rock the Tabla" was released featuring Omer Faruk Tekbilek, A. R. Rahman, Hossam Ramzy, Billy Cobham & Manu Katché.

== Discography ==
1. The Sultans Middle Eastern Band Vol 1 (1981)
2. The Sultans Middle Eastern Band Vol 2 (1982)
3. Best of Sultans (1986)
4. Suleyman The Magnificent (1988)
5. Fire Dance (1990)
6. Beyond The Sky (1992)
7. Whirling (1994)
8. Fata Morgana (1995)
9. Mystical Garden (1996)
10. Crescent Moon (1998)
11. One Truth (1999, World Class/Hearts of Space Records)
12. Dance into Eternity: Selected Pieces 1987–1998 (2000)
13. Alif (2002)
14. Tree Of Patience (2005)
15. Rare Elements (Remixes) (2009)
16. Kelebek (Butterfly) (2009)
17. Best of Omar Faruk Tekbilek “Longing” (2010)
18. Sound of Istanbul, Vol. 1 (2011)
19. Dance for Peace "Sufi Selections of OMAR FARUK TEKBILEK" (2011)
20. The Meeting of The Legends "Askin Project" (2012)
21. Love Is My Religion (2016)

== See also ==
- One (Yuval Ron album)
- Offerings (VAS album)
- Arab Orchestra of Nazareth
- Awards for world music
- List of oud players
