= Tarek Abdallah =

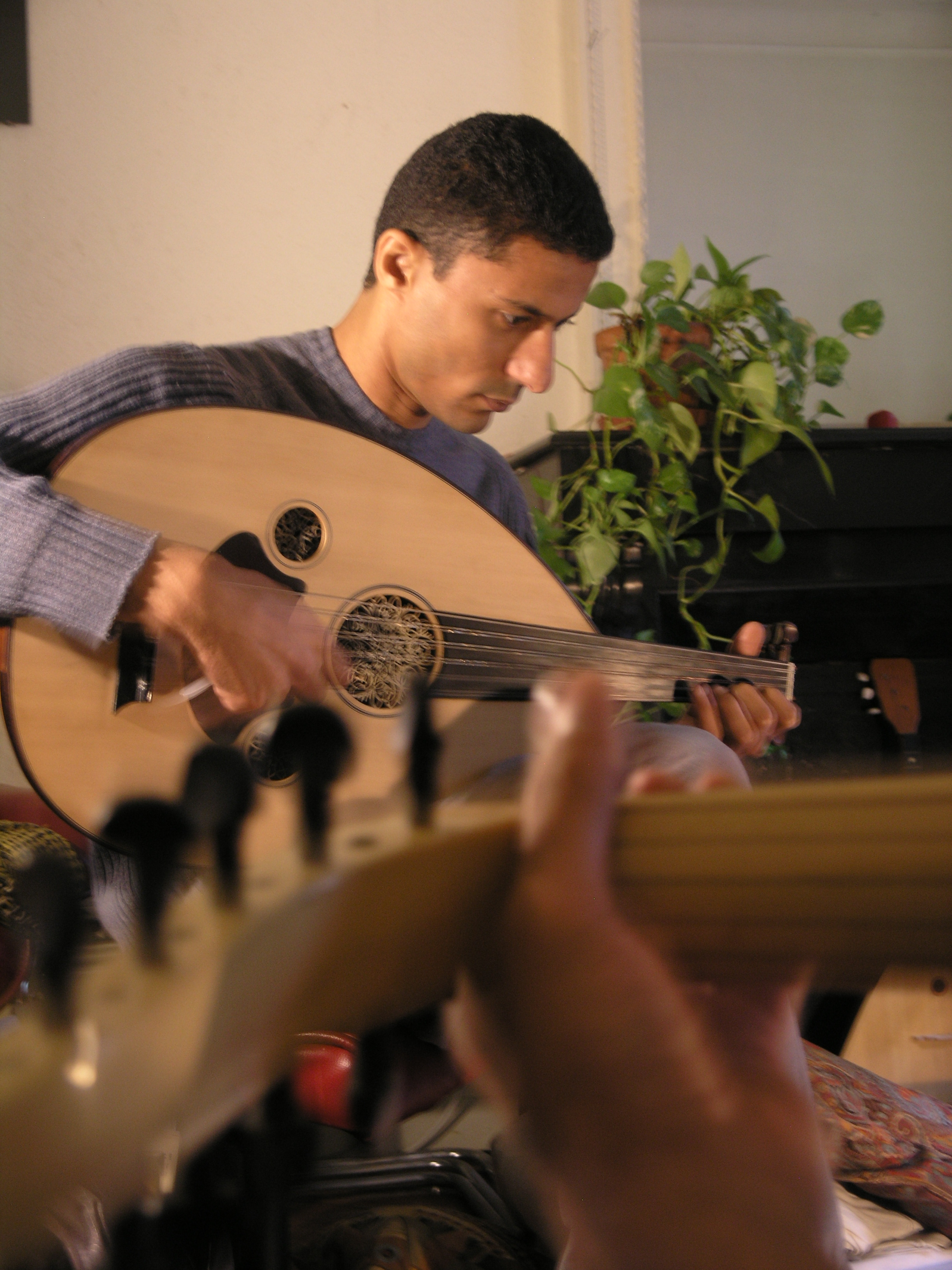
- Tark Abdallah improvising at Pierre Cormon's place in Geneva, Switzerland, 29.6.2006

Background information
- Born: 1975 (age 49–50)
- Origin: Alexandria, Egypt
- Genres: Egyptian classical music
- Occupation(s): musician, composer, musicologist
- Instrument: oud
- Website: tarekabdallah.com

Tarek Abdallah is an Egyptian oud player, composer and musicologist who lives in France.

== Biography ==
Tarek Abdallah was born in Alexandria in 1975. He had been attracted to the oud since his childhood, after having seen a comedian playing the instrument on TV, but due to the opposition of his family, he had to wait until he was 19 to touch one for the first time in his life. Studying with the Alexandrian master Hazem Shaheen, he practiced 10 hours a day in order to enter The Arabic Oud House, an oud school created in Cairo by the Iraqi master Naseer Shamma. He graduated from there with an excellence award. He lives in Marseille since 2001 and conducts musicology research at the Lumière University Lyon 2, about the notion of virtuosity in Egypt between 1904 and 1932. He analyses the evolution of the style, of the ornament and of the instrumental technique. He has been invited in several Arabic countries in order to give master classes. He released his first album, Wasla, with the percussion player Adel Shams El-Din, in 2015.

== Style ==
The album Wasla draws from music of the Nahda (Renaissance) era (1910 – 1930). It is based on the waslah form, which is a musical suite in one mode with varying rhythms. But contrary to the music of the Nahda era, his music is purely instrumental. Some of the rhythms used in the album are very complex, some of them were used only once in the tradition, some of hem were invented. The French magazine Les Inrockuptibles praised Abdalla's “sober and refined way of playing, with a naked and very pure melody, indifferent to frivolity, of irreproachable ethics“.
