= Mutref al Mutref =

Kuwaiti singer (born 1986)

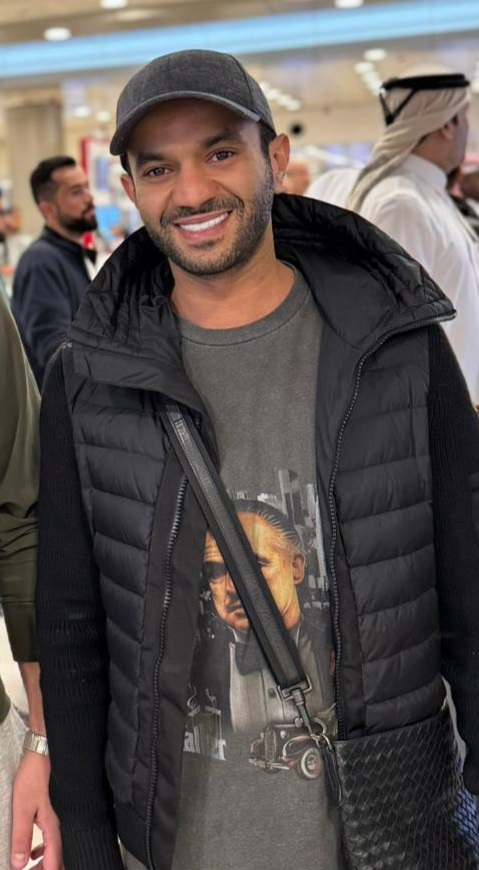
- Al Mutef in December 2024
- Born: September 8, 1986 (age 39); Kuwait
- Occupation: Singer
- Years active: 2009 – present

Mutref al Mutref is a Kuwaiti singer. He is cited in Kuwaiti media as one of the country's upcoming generation of young singers.

== Life and career ==
Al Mutref was born in Kuwait in 1986. His father was singer Yusif Al Mutref. Al Mutref began singing and playing the oud at the age of 13, but hid it from his father who wanted him to concentrate on his studies. He began appearing on Adanyat on Kuwait FM 103.7. In 2013, he won first place for singing at the GCC Music Festival. In 2014, Al Mutref signed with Rotana Records and released his first studio album Monhak Gharam. He has performed in the UAE and the United States. Al Mutref released Fagdek in 2018. The album is a collaboration with various poets.

== Discography ==
- Laheeb Alshoug (2011)
- Monhak Gharam (2015)
- Fagdek (2018)
