= Ilham al-Madfai =

Iraqi musician

Ilham al-Madfai إلهام المدفعي
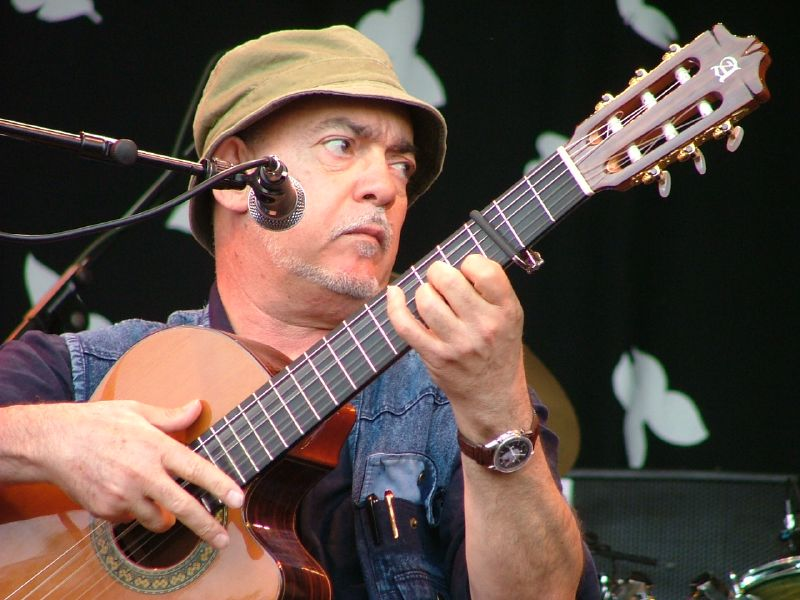
- Al Madfai performing in 2005

Background information
- Also known as: The Baghdad Beatle
- Born: 1942 (age 83–84)
- Origin: Baghdad, Kingdom of Iraq
- Occupations: Musician, composer
- Instruments: Vocals, guitar
- Years active: 1961–present
- Labels: EMI, Virgin

Ilham al-Madfai (Arabic: إلهام المدفعي) (born 1942) is an Iraqi guitarist, singer and composer. al-Madfai's synthesis of Western guitar stylings with traditional Iraqi music has made him a popular performer in his native country and throughout the Middle East. Beginning in 1999, al-Madfai released a string of albums on EMI's label, including his platinum eponymous debut, Ilham al-Madfai (1999), Live at the Hard Rock Cafe (2001), Baghdad (2003) and The Voice of Iraq: The Best of Ilham al-Madfai (2005). In 2009, Al-Madfai released Dishdasha. His Western-inspired compositions led to a nickname; "The Baghdad Beatle".

== Biography ==
Ilham al-Madfai was born in 1942 in Baghdad, Iraq, to an Iraqi Arab father from the Al Madfai family and a Kurdish mother. His Kurdish heritage is an important aspect of his identity, and he has spoken about it in interviews. For instance, he released a new single during a seminar with musicians and artists in Erbil, the capital of the Kurdistan Region, highlighting his connection to Kurdish culture, Al-Madfai began studying guitar at age twelve. He formed The Twisters in 1961, Iraq's first rock and roll band. Following a three-year sojourn in Kuwait with the group, al-Madfai moved to England to complete an engineering degree. While in London, he became a regular at the Baghdad Cafe, where he met fellow musicians Paul McCartney, Donovan and Georgie Fame. Returning to Baghdad in 1967, he began to mix Western and Eastern instrumentation and rhythms. Al-Madfai developed a major following in Iraq in the 1970s, but Saddam Hussein's rise to power in 1979 compelled the artist to leave and take construction jobs around the Gulf for much of the following decade.

Al-Madfai returned to Iraq shortly before the First Gulf War and was subsequently banned from leaving the country. He emigrated to Jordan in 1994, where he presently resides. Al-Madfai was granted Jordanian citizenship from King Hussein, for exceptional talents and achievement. On 9 August 2010, he was the featured artist in a late-night prom at the Royal Albert Hall in London.

In 2017 a Polish documentary movie Arabic secret was released in which his Polish son visited him for the very first time in Jordan. Ilham al-Madfai was surprised with the visit.

== Selected discography ==
- Ilham al-Madfai (1999) EMI
- Live at the Hard Rock Cafe (2001) EMI
- Baghdad (2003) EMI
- The Voice of Iraq: The Best of Ilham al-Madfai (2005) EMI
- Dishdasha (2009) Virgin
