= Cairo Congress of Arab Music =

1932 symposium and music festival for Arabic music

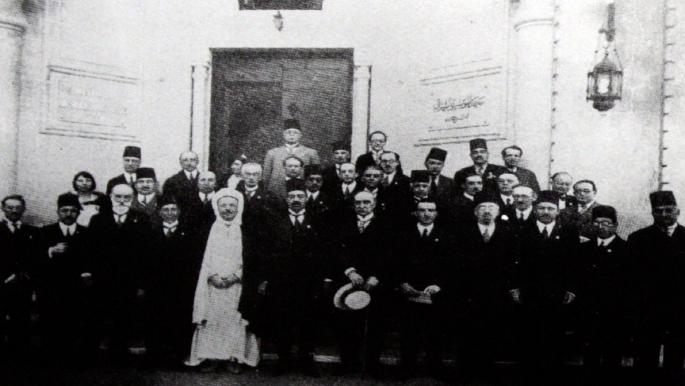
Participants of the Cairo Congress of Music, 1932

The first Congrès du Caire (First Congress of Arab Music; Arabic: مؤتمر الموسيقى العربية الأول; Mu'tamar al'mūsiqā al-'arabiyya al-awwal) was a large international symposium and music festival that was convened by King Fuad I in Cairo, Egypt, from 14 March to 3 April 1932. The idea had been suggested to Fuad by the French ethnomusicologist Baron Rodolphe d'Erlanger, and the congress was the first large-scale forum to present, discuss, document and record many musical traditions of the Arab world from North Africa and the Middle East.

The performances of the various Arabic music ensembles were recorded and produced in just four copies on 171 phonograph records. These recordings were finally released in digital form in 2015.

== Overview ==
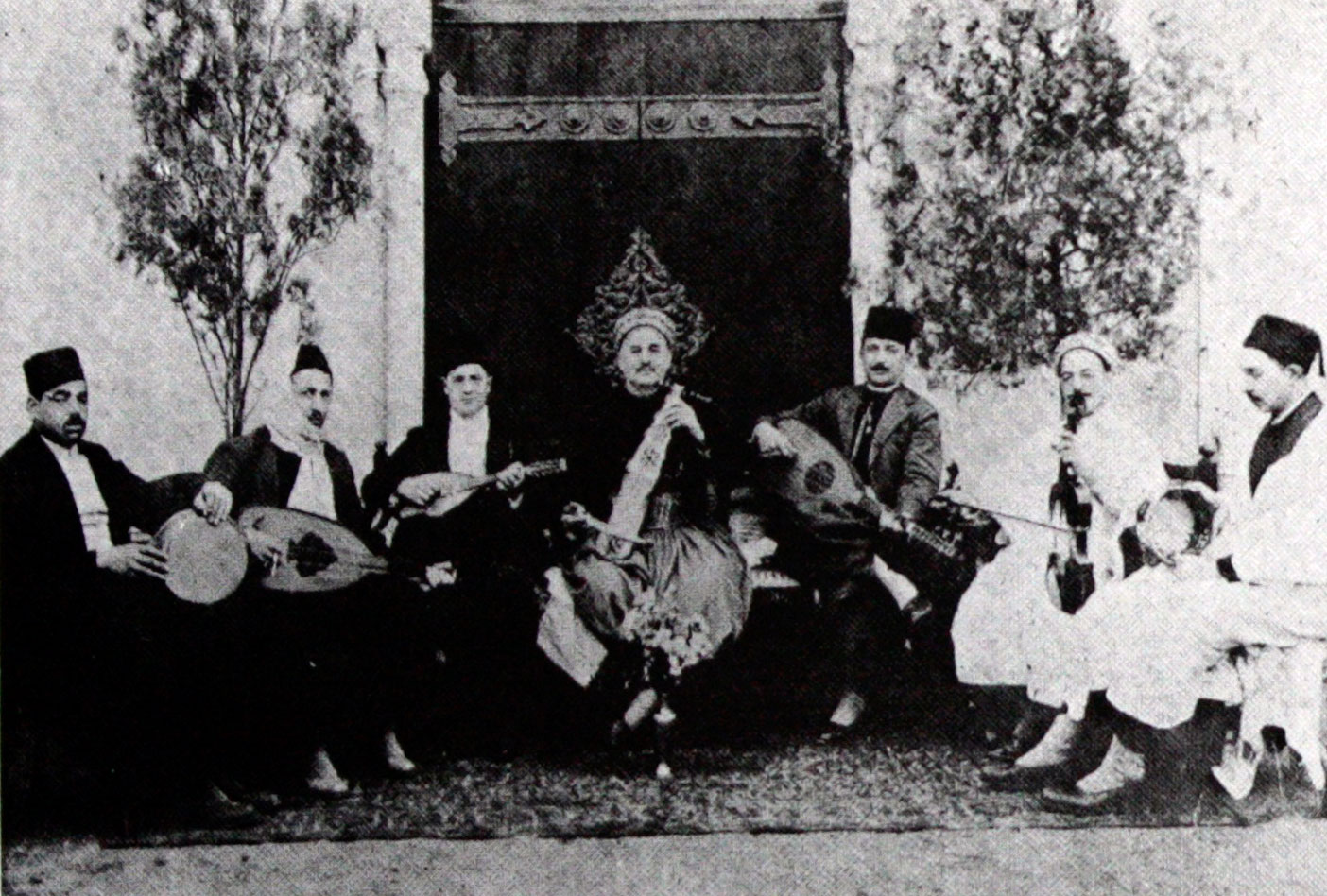
The Algerian ensemble under the direction of Larbi Bensari

By a royal decree of January 20, 1932, a commission was appointed to organize the congress. It was headed by the Minister of Public Education Muhammad Hilmi Isa Pasha, with d'Erlanger serving as vice-chairman and Mahmud Ahmed El-Hefni in charge of the General Secretariat.

The congress was held at the National Academy of Music, at 22 Malika Nazly Street (now Ramses Street) in the Azbakeya district of downtown Cairo. It drew scholars and performers from throughout the Arabic-speaking world as well as from Turkey, including Muhammad Fathi, Ali Al-Darwish, Kamel al-Khola'ie, Mahmud Hefni, Tawfiq Al-Sabbagh, Rauf Yekta, Khemaïs Tarnane, Mohammed Gnanem, Mohammed Ben Hassan, Mohammed Cherif, Larbi Bensari, M'hamed El Kourd, and Mesut Cemil. European scholars, composers and musicologists attending were Henry George Farmer, Béla Bartók, Paul Hindemith, Alexis Chottin (the head of the National Conservatory for Music in Rabat), Father Xavier Maurice Collangettes, Erich Moritz von Hornbostel, Curt Sachs, Robert Lachmann and Mady Humbert-Lavergne. The countries sending delegations of musicians included Algeria, Egypt, Iraq, Morocco, Syria, Tunisia as well as Turkey, each of them representing their own musical traditions.

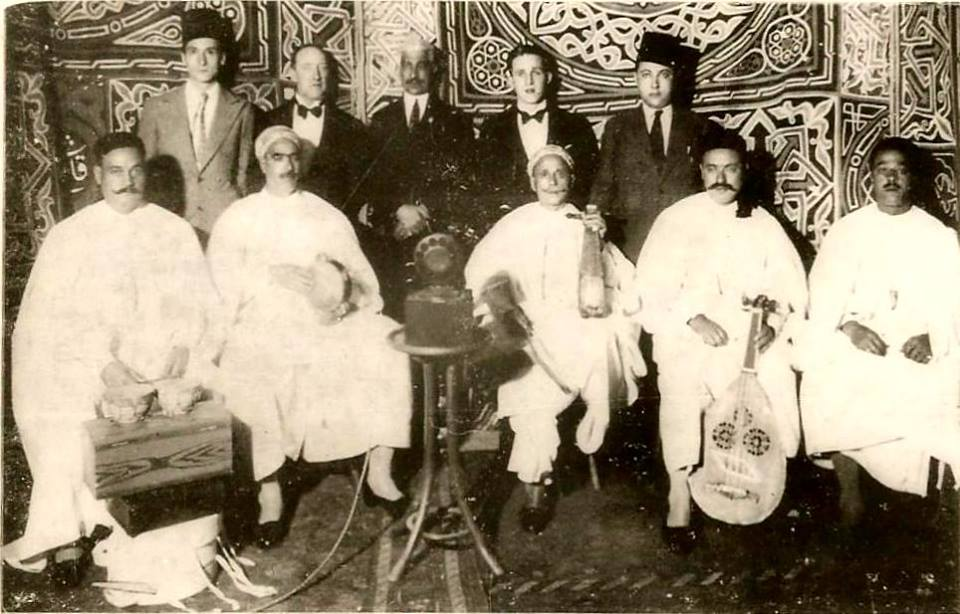
The Tunisian ensemble with instruments and a recording device

The sections of the Congress focused on the past, present and future of Arabic music, which had been called "Oriental music" before. Believing such music to be in need of modernization in the face of 20th-century developments of the entertainment industry, it made recommendations for its development and definition as part of Arabic culture. In addition, proposals for the modernization and standardization of Arabic music were presented, including a proposal to standardize the Arabic tuning system to 24 equal steps per octave including quarter tones, thus substituting an equal-tempered system for the traditional non-tempered system. The Egyptian delegate Muhammad Fathi recommended that Western instruments be integrated into Arabic ensembles, due to what he believed to be their superior expressive qualities.

Hungarian composer and ethnomusicologist Bartók, who was interested in folk music, regretted the “devastating” influence of European entertainment music on urban Arabic music and was fascinated by a folkloric Zār-ceremony presented in his view by members of the “lower population class” in Cairo. In addition to the ensembles of El-Sitt Om Ibrahim and Fatma el-Shamieh for this Zār ceremony, Bedouins from the oasis of Faiyum and folk musicians led by Muhammad Effendi al-‘Arabi also appeared as representatives of folk music. Further recordings featured members of the Mawlawiyya and Laythiyya dervish orders and performers of Coptic religious music. The singer Annusa al-Masriyya and her ensemble of women were represented with four songs in the classical Arabic singing style of an almah.

On 3 April, a gala concert was held at the Cairo Opera House. The concerts by Iraqi singer Muhammad al-Qubanchi and his Jewish-Iraqi instrumentalists presented the most prestigious musical form of their country, the Iraqi maqam. Performing for the first time in Egypt, al-Qubanchi was awarded with the first prize of the Congress by King Fuad.

== Recordings ==
334 performances of Arabic music by the participating ensembles were recorded and 171 phonograph records were produced by His Master's Voice for exclusively documentary purposes. They were donated to the Bibliothèque nationale de France in Paris, the British Library and the Ethnological Museum of Berlin, with another set initially given to the Guimet Museum in Paris by King Fuad I.

Decades later, their collection of these records was digitized by the French National Library (BnF) and resulted in the first complete remastered edition of the recordings in 2015. Supported by a partnership between the BnF and the Department of Culture and Tourism of Abu Dhabi, this edition was published as a set of 18 CDs with a trilingual booklet in Arabic, French and English.

The Cairo Congress was later followed by similar meetings to document and institutionalize Arabic and regional musical genres. In May 1939, the First Congress of Moroccan Music for Andalusi classical music was held in Fez with participants from the Maghreb countries, France, and Spain. Two more pan-Arab music congresses were organized by the Arab Academy of Music, including a congress in Tripoli in 1961 and another one in Fez in 1969. The Arab Academy of Music is a body affiliated to the Arab League and the International Music Council.

From 25 to 28 May 1989, a conference under the direction of the ethnomusicologist Sheherazade Qassim Hassan was held in Cairo. It focused on the historical documents from the 1932 Congress and the extensive contemporary echo in the Egyptian press. Scientists from Europe, Egypt, Morocco, Algeria and Tunisia evaluated the previously unpublished documents and the proceedings of the Congress from their contemporary perspective. The results of this conference were published online in a French version.

== Discography ==
- 1988 - Congrès du Caire, 1932: musique arabe savante & populaire / Muhammad al-Qubanchi, Dawood Hosni, Muhammad Ghanim, etc. 2 CDs made from historical recordings in the occasion of Cairo Congress in 1932: v. 1. Musique savante de Bagdad/Irak; Musique populaire/Égypte—v. 2. Musique citadine de Tlemcen/Algérie; Musique savante de Fès/Maroc; Musique citadine de Tunis/Tunisie. Includes a special booklet in Arabic, English, and French. Paris: Édition Bibliothèque Nationale - L'Institut du Monde arabe (Ma`had al-`Alam al-`Arabi), APN 88-9,10.
- 1989 - Maroc: Musique Classique / Congres du Caire 1932 Cheikh Mohamed Chouika and Omar Jaïdi / Moroccan famous musicians. Paris: Club du Disque Arabe/Artistes Arabes Associés AAA006.
- 1994 - Le Maqam en Iraq vol. I Congres du Caire 1932 / Muhammad al-Qubanchi / Iraqi singer Muhammad al-Qubanchi, et al. Paris: Club du Disque Arabe AAA087.
- 1994 - Malouf Tunisien: La Musique Classique Tunisienne - Congres du Caire 1932. Tunisian classical music performed by Mohamed Ben Hassan and Mohamed Cherif. Paris: Club du Disque Arabe AAA094.
- 1994 - Le Maqam en Iraq vol. II Congres du Caire 1932 / Muhammad al-Qubanchi / Historical recordings of Iraqi Muhammad al-Qubanchi, et al. Paris: Club du Disque Arabe AAA097.
- 1995 - Musique Classique Arabo-Andalouse - Ecole de Tlemcen Congres du Caire 1932 / Elhadj Elarbi Bensari et Rodwane. Historical recordings of Algerian Larbi Bensari (1857-1964) and his son Redouane. Paris: Club du Disque Arabe AAA098.
- 2015 - Congrès de musique arabe du Caire (The Cairo congress of Arab music), 1932. Sous la direction de Jean Lambert et de Pascal Cordereix. Texte original de Bernard Moussali, (Complete remastered edition)

== Bibliography ==
- Bartók, Béla, with contributor Benjamin Suchoff (1992). Music/History and criticism series. Univ. of Nebraska Press. ISBN 0-8032-6108-X.
- Qassim Hassan, Shéhérazade and Philippe Vigreux, (eds.) (1992). Musique arabe; Le Congrès du Caire de 1932. Cairo: Cedej.
- el-Ḥefnī, Maḥmūd Aḥmed (ed) (1934). Recueil des travaux du Congrès de Musique Arabe qui s’est tenu au Caire en 1932 (Hég. 1350) sous le haut patronage de S.M. Fouad Ier, Roi d’Égypte. Cairo.
- Katz, Israel J. "Congress of Arab Music 1932" (2018), in Encyclopaedia of Islam, Leiden, iii, pp. 17–21.
- "Conversation with Jean Lambert, ethnomusicologist. – Beyond 1932". 2025-12-02.
- Moussali, Bernard; Lambert, Jean (2024). Le Congrès du Caire de 1932: la musique arabe à la recherche de son identité (in French). Paris: Geuthner. ISBN 978-2-7053-4124-4.
- Racy, A.J., "Historical worldviews of early ethnomusicologists: An east-west encounter in Cairo, 1932 (1991) in S. Blum, et al (eds.), Ethnomusicology and modern music history. Urbana-Chicago 1991, 68-91.
- _____ (2003). Making Music in the Arab World: The Culture and Artistry of Ṭarab. Cambridge Univ. Press.
- _____ (2015). "Comparative musicologists in the field: Reflections on the Cairo Congress of Arab Music, 1932 (2015) in V.L. Levine and P.V. Bohlman (eds.), This thing called music: Essays in honor of Bruno Nettl, Lanham, MD, pp. 137–50.
- Sawa, George Dimitri (1993). The World of Music 35, no. 3, pp. 107–11.
- Shannon, Jonathan Holt (2006). Among the Jasmine Trees: Music and Modernity in Contemporary Syria. Social life and customs series. Middletown, Connecticut: Wesleyan University Press. ISBN 0-8195-6798-1.
- Vigreux, Philippe, ed. (1992). Musique arabe: Le Congrès du Caire de 1932 (in French). Le Caire: CEDEJ - Égypte/Soudan. doi:10.4000/books.cedej.1922. ISBN 978-2-900956-23-6.
