= Tigrane Kazazian =

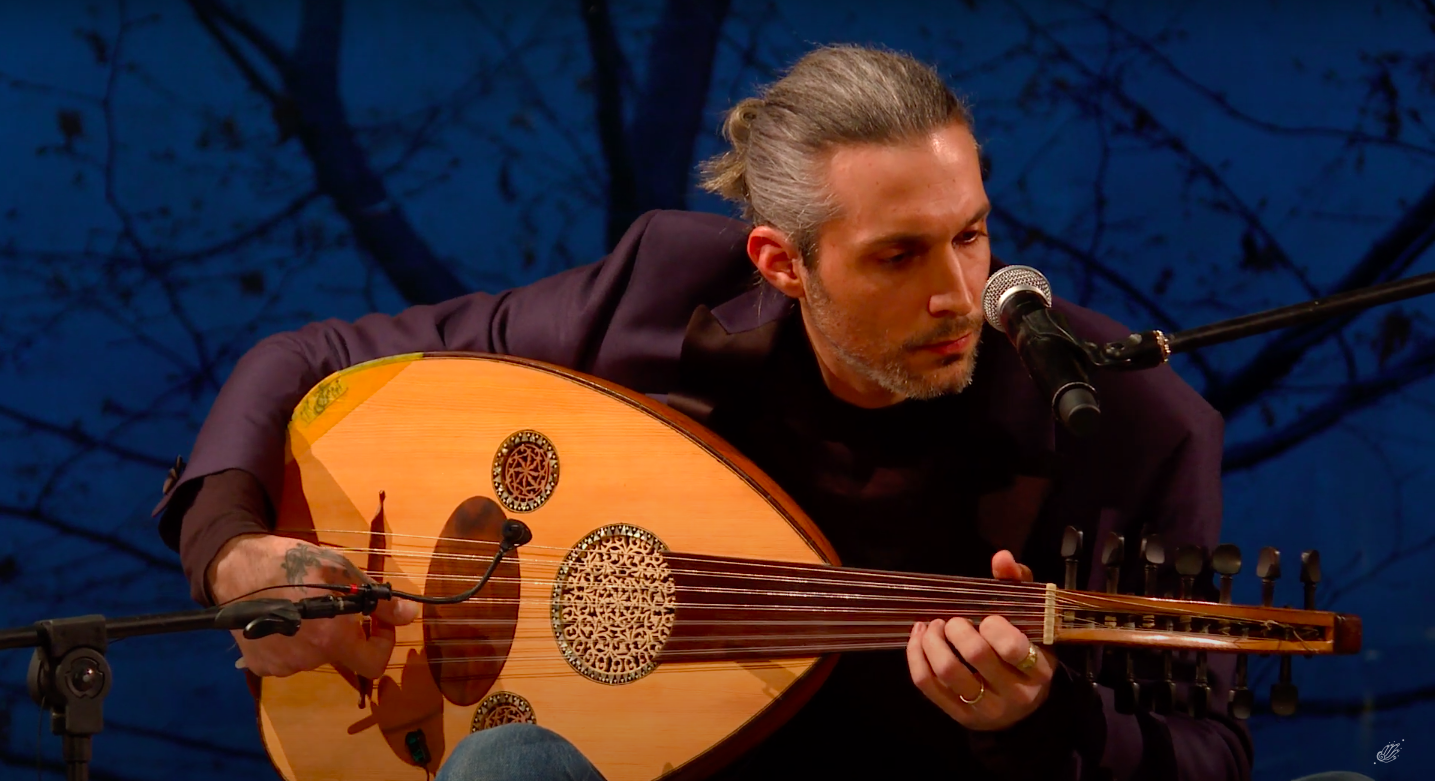
- Tigrane Kazazian in 2022

Background information
- Born: April 9, 1987 (age 38); Cairo, Egypt
- Genres: Avant-garde, folk, world music, jazz
- Occupations: Composer; Oud player
- Instrument: Oud
- Website: tigranekazazian.com

Tigrane Kazazian (Armenian: Տիգրան Կազազյան; born April 9, 1987) is a French-Armenian composer, oud player and multi-instrumentalist. He plays avant-garde, folk, and world music-inspired original compositions.

== Biography ==
Tigrane was born on April 9, 1987, in Cairo, Egypt, to a composer and oud player, Georges Kazazian, and a historian, Anne Le Gall-Kazazian. He was educated at the American University of Cairo. At the age of 19, he left Cairo to study at Concordia University where he earned a degree in political science and government. From 5 to 17 years old, he played tennis at a high-level, competing in Egypt and France.

In 2012, he moved to Armenia to study at the Komitas State Conservatory of Yerevan.

In 2016, he and his father, Georges Kazazian, formed the Nour Project following an invitation by the Ministry of Culture of Armenia.

In 2018, Tigrane Kazazian formed the Kazazian trio, with Duduk player Arsen Petrosyan, an artist nominated for Best Artist in the Songlines Music Awards.

In 2021, his album, Cairo Nights, was published by Green United Music. In the same year, his music was featured in the documentaries including 1915 : le Génocide des chrétiens en Turquie and 2 mois après le drame: les chrétiens se relèvent by France 2 and on RTS Swiss Radio.

In 2022, Tigrane Kazazian formed the Tigrane Kazazian Quartet. The Quartet gave its first three concerts in Armenia as part of the Francophonie Organization. Tigrane Kazazian also collaborated with Swiss composer-musician Albin Brun in a concert commemorating the 30th anniversary of diplomatic relations between Switzerland and Armenia on April 21, 2022, in Yerevan, Armenia.

== Discography ==
- "A Lifelong Love Part A - Still Love"
- "A Lifelong Love Part B - Still Love"
- "Nowhere Now Here - Now Here"
- "Watching The Flames - Nar"
- "Shifting Sands - Moving Sands"
- "Streams And Rivers - Love Stream"
- "Blooming At Night Part A - Lila"
- "Blooming At Night Part B - Lila"
- "Enlightening The Way - La Voie"
- "A Dialogue Part A - Dia-Logue"
- "A Dialogue Part B - Dia-Logue"
- "Cairo Nights Part A - Cairo Nights"
- "Cairo Nights Part B - Cairo Nights"
- "Whitewashed Walls - Baleares"
