= Yurdal Tokcan =

Yurdal Tokcan Yurdal Tokcan
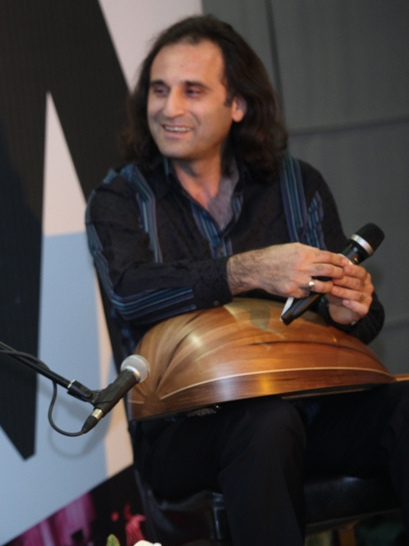
- Yurdal Tokcan on stage with Burcu Karadağ and Göksel Baktagir during a performance in Istanbul in 2012.

Background information
- Also known as: Yurdal Tokdjan, Yurdal Tokjan
- Born: 1 January 1966 (age 59); Ordu, Turkey
- Genres: Turkish traditional music, Jazz
- Occupation(s): Composer, instrumentalist
- Instrument: oud
- Years active: 1988–present

Yurdal Tokcan is a Turkish oud player.

== Early life and career ==
He was born in 1966 in Ordu, Turkey and attended the Istanbul Technical University, where he graduated in 1988. In 1990, he was appointed as an oud player to the Istanbul State Turkish Music Ensemble, which belongs to the Turkish Ministry of Culture and Tourism. Since then he has performed both solo and as part of many musical groups. He has also contributed to many film scores.
