= Arabic Oud House =

Music school for the Arabic instrument oud

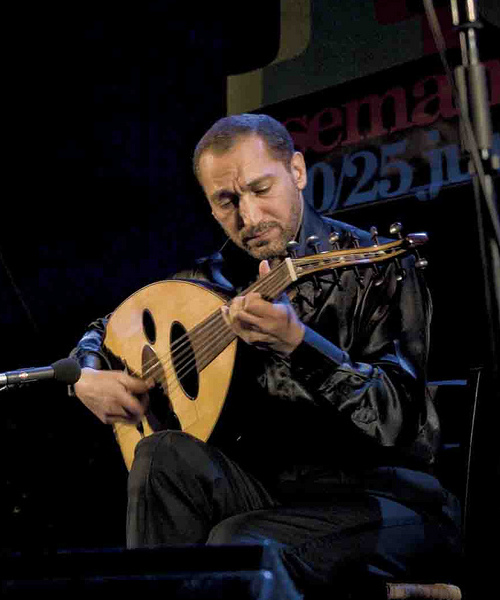

The Arabic Oud House (Arabic: بيت العود) is a music school for the traditional Arabic lute called oud in Cairo, Egypt. Founded by Iraqi oud player Naseer Shamma, the school has trained a new generation of oud players and subsequently opened branches in the United Arab Emirates, Iraq, Algeria and Sudan.

== History ==
The Arabic Oud House was created in 1999 in Cairo by Iraqi oud player and composer Naseer Shamma. Shamma, who graduated from the Baghdad Academy of Music, is a UNESCO Artist for Peace and has been distinguished by other organizations like the International Red Crescent and Red Cross Societies as goodwill ambassador.

It is said to be the first music school exclusively dedicated to teaching oud as a solo instrument, which is a relatively recent development for the instrument. Initially based at the Cairo Opera House, it has since moved to an historical building in the old city of Cairo. Since its beginning, it has gained an international reputation as an oud school. Oud players like Yurdal Tokcan from Turkey or Saïd Chraibi from Morocco gave masterclasses there, and several oud players of a new generation graduated from it, such as Tarek Abdallah, Ghassan Youssef, Hazem El Shahin or Nehad El Sayyed.

In the following years, the Arabic Oud House opened branches in Abu Dhabi, Alexandria, Baghdad, Constantine and Khartoum. The music school in Khartoum also teaches the stringed instrument qanun and has trained craftsmen in the production of the oud. Further, it aspires to become a center for oud players all over Africa.

== In literature ==
The novel Le Traître, by Pierre Cormon, is partly set in the Arabic Oud House, where it is called 'Arabic Lute Institute'.

== See also ==
- Arabic music
