= Mazaher =

- Origin: Egypt
- Genres: Zār
- Members: Umm Sameh; Umm Hassan; Nour el Sabah

Mazaher is an ensemble in which women play a leading role. The musicians of Mazaher, Umm Sameh, Umm Hassan, Nour el Sabah, are among the last remaining Zār (زار) practitioners in Egypt.

Zār is a community healing ritual of drumming and dancing whose tradition is carried on mainly by women (men have the secondary roles) and whose main participants are women.

A featured instrument in the Zār ritual is the tanbūra, a six-string lyre, which, like the Zār practice itself, exists in various forms in an area stretching across East Africa to the Arabian Peninsula. Other instruments are the mangour, a leather belt sewn with many goat hooves, and various percussion instruments.
