= Georges Kazazian =

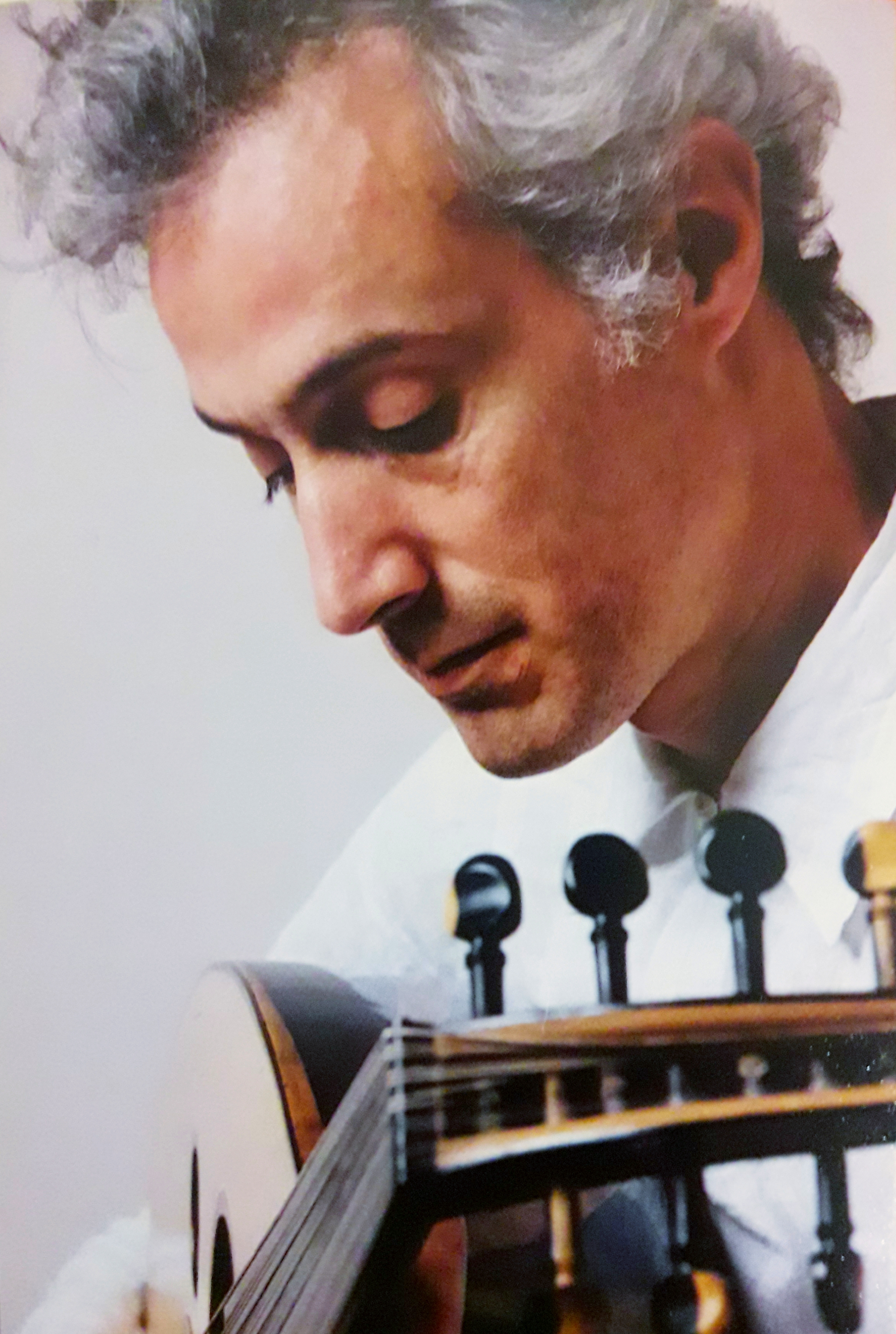

Background information
- Born: January 25, 1953 (age 73); Cairo, Egypt
- Genres: Contemporary, oriental, world music, jazz
- Occupations: Composer; Oud player
- Instrument: Oud
- Website: georgeskazazian.com

Georges Kazazian (Arabic: جـورج كازازيان) (born 25 Jan 1953) is an Egyptian-Armenian composer and oud player. He moved between two cultures in the vicinity of his cosmopolitan society, a feature of the social and demographic structure of Cairo at that time, which contributed to its open and decentralized compositions.

== Early life and career ==
Georges Kazazian was born into an Egyptian-Armenian family in Cairo, Egypt in 1953. He completed his musical training as a self-taught artist.

In 1991, after composing music for theater and film during the 1980s, he released his debut album Sabil.

Georges Kazazian has performed around the world in prestigious venues, including at the Pyramids of Egypt and in India, in the project Neel Prayag with Indian maestro Shivkumar Sharma, in 2003.

In 2004, Georges Kazazian created the project Ocre and collaborated with French trumpet player Michel Marre and percussionist Ravi Magnifique.

In 2009, Georges Kazazian and Rahul Sharma collaborated and released the album, Meeting By The Nile produced by Saregama.

In 2010, Georges Kazazian created Project Sabil and collaborated with Albin Brun, saxophone player. In 2011, he performed with flamenco guitarist Pedro Soler in Paris and Montreal.

He created the White Lotus Project in 2011, in collaboration with accordion player Patricia Draeger, and saxophone player, Luca Sisera double bass, Chris Brown drums. Concerts were held in Egypt and Switzerland.

Georges Kazazian's son, Tigrane Kazazian, is also a composer, oud player and multi-instrumentalist. Georges and Tigrane Kazazian collaborate through the project they have jointly created, the Nour project, with performances at The Opera House in Cairo, Egypt, in 2017 and in Yerevan, Armenia, in 2016.

== Discography ==
=== Albums ===
- Sabil (1991)
- Sagate (1997)
- Sajaya (1997)
- Le concert de Nanterre avec Pedro Soler, Kudsi Erguner, Renaud Garcia Fons, Keyvan Chemirani (1997)
- Nil Sangit (1999)
- Suite "al Ganûb" (1999, 3-CD set)
- Monaga (2001)
- Azraq (2002)
- Dayra Jazz (2002)
- Neel Dhun (2008)
- Zafir (2008).
- Meeting By The Nile with Rahul Sharma (2009)

=== Documentary soundtracks ===
- The Egyptian Museum by M.Islam (1979)
- Temples of Upper Egypt by M.Islam (1979)
- The Citadel by M.Islam (1979)
- Ramses The Second by Shadi Abdel Salam (1980)
- Before The Pyramids by Shadi Abdel Salam (1981)
- The Third Circle by M Zakaria (1988)
- Love Dance by Ihab Shaker (1992)
- Silent Dialogue by Ali El Ghazouli (1999)
- Les hommes oubliés de la vallée des Rois by Jérôme Prieur – France (2002)

=== Feature films ===
- The Hunger by Ali Badrakhan (1986)
- Kaher El Zaman by Kamal El Sheikh (1986)
- The Wife of an Important Man by Mohamed Khan (1988)
- The Lady of Cairo by Moumen El Semehi (1991)
- Ruis Blas by Jacques Weber (2003), an extract of the album Sabil was featured in this film
- Factory Girl by Mohamad Khan (2013)
