= Shaul Bustan =

Israeli composer, conductor and musician

Shaul Bustan (Hebrew: שאול בוסתן; born 1983 in Beer-Sheva), is an Israeli composer, conductor and Oud player who has worked with several influential orchestras and ensembles throughout Israel, Germany, Austria, Netherlands and the USA including the Israel Philharmonic Orchestra, the Los Angeles Jewish Symphony, Koninklijke Harmoniekapel Delft, the Tiroler Ensemble für Neue Musik and klezmer-maestro Giora Feidman.

His works have been performed by most of Israel's orchestras and ensembles, including the Israel Philharmonic Orchestra, the Raanana Symphonette, the Israeli Sinfonietta Beer Sheva, the Caprizma Ensemble, and the Meitar Ensemble.

He was the musical director and composer of the German theatre company Das letzte Kleinod (The Last Treasure). Currently he is the conductor and musical director of several choirs in Berlin.

From 2015 to March 2017, he was a member of Das Rotem Ensemble (Rotem is an Israeli name of a flower), a Berlin-based musical group, consisting of Bustan (bass), Avner Geiger (flute), and Tom Dayan (drum). The Israeli musicians all studied at Jerusalem Academy of Music and Dance and formed their ensemble after moving to Germany. Bustan composes their music, arrangements of Israeli melodies.

With new partners, he renamed his trio the Shaul Bustan Trio, with himself playing bass percussion and oud, with cello and violin.

== Awards and education ==
His awards include the Chana Avni-Yaddor Composition Competition for 2007-2008, the Deborah Grossman Award for Excellence in Music Education for 2005-2006, 'Theaterpreis des Bundes' for 2015, and the 'Hermann-Allmers-Preis״ (also for 2015) with Das letzte Kleinod.

For his compositions and skill playing mandolin from 2000-2008, he was awarded America-Israel Cultural Foundation scholarships.

Shaul attended the Jerusalem Academy of Music and Dance, where he studied under violinist Motti Smidt, composer Haim Permont, and conductor-composer Aharon Harlap.
