= Claudie Marcel-Dubois =

French musicologist

- Born: 19 January 1913; Tours, France
- Died: 1 February 1989 (age 76); Paris, France
- Occupations: Musicologist, folklorist, pianist, educator
- Known for: President of the Société d'ethnologie française (1978–1987)

Claudie Marcel-Dubois (19 January 1913 – 1 February 1989) was a French ethnomusicologist and pianist. From 1937 until her retirement in 1981, she worked at the Musée national des Arts et Traditions populaires (MNATP) in Paris. She was president of the Société d'ethnologie française from 1978 to 1987. She taught at the Ecole des Hautes Etudes en Sciences Sociales in Paris.

== Early life and education ==
Marcel-Dubois was born in Tours. She studied piano at the Conservatoire de Paris from 1926 to 1928, with further studies under Marguerite Long. She studied anthropology and ethnology in the 1930s with Marcel Mauss and Paul Masson-Oursel.

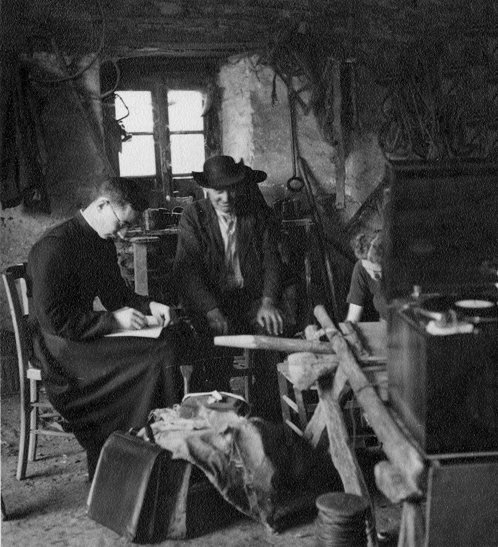
In this 1939 photograph, Claudie Marcel-Debois is at the right, head down, writing, with L'Abbé François Falc'hun on the left, and Yves Gouriou at the center.

== Career ==
Marcel-Dubois worked with musicologists André Schaeffner and Curt Sachs at the Musée de l'Homme beginning in 1934. She joined the staff at the Musée national des Arts et Traditions populaires (MNATP) when it opened in 1937, and retired from the museum in 1981, as head of the ethnomusicology department and sound library. Marie-Marguerite Pichonnet-Andral was her assistant and eventually her successor at MNATP.

Marcel-Dubois was president of the Société d'ethnologie française from 1978 to 1987. She taught ethnomusicology at the Ecole des Hautes Etudes en Sciences Sociales in Paris. She served on the radio commission of the International Folk Music Council. She and Andral worked with Alan Lomax to compile a collection of French folk music recordings, published in 1954 by the Columbia World Library of Folk and Primitive Music. She also worked with Ralph Rinzler on collecting Francophone folk songs in Louisiana.

== Publications ==
Marcel-Dubois was the author of several books. Her articles appeared in scholarly journals including Revue des arts asiatiques,

- "A propos de 'Scènes de musique et de danse'" (1936)
- "Notes sur les instruments de musique figurés dans l'art plastique de l'Inde ancienne" (1937)
- Les instruments de musique de l’Inde ancienne (1941)
- La Bresse (1941, a collection of French folk songs, compiled with François Agostini and Pierre d'Anjou)
- Instruments de musique populaires d’Europe (1946)
- "Vues Sommaires sur les Recherches Actuelles et le Maintien de la Tradition Musicale Populaire Francaise" (1949)
- Chants de compagnonnage (1951, with R. Lecottè)
- "'En paradis, il y a-t-un arbre'" (1953)
- Musique populaire vocale de l’île de Batz (1954, with M.-M. Andral)
- "Extensions du domaine d’observations directes en ethnographie musicale française" (1954)
- "Le toulouhou des Pyrénées centrales" (1956)
- "La 'Saint-Marcel' de Barjols" (1957)
- "Ethnomusicologie de la France 1945–1959" (1960)
- "Instruments de musique du cirque" (1960)
- "Curt Sachs" (1960)
- "Principes essentiels de l’enquête ethnomusicologie: quelques applications françaises" (1961)
- "Le tambour bourdonnant" (1964)
- "Marguerite d'Harcourt" (1965)
- "Le tempo dans les musiques de tradition orale" (1965)
- "Le tambour-bourdon: son signal et sa tradition" (1966)
- "The Objectives of Music and Musical Instrument Collections in a National Ethnological Museum" (1969)
- "Fêtes villageoises et vacarmes cérémoniels" (1972)
- "Musique et phénomènes paramusicaux" (1975, with M. Pichonnet-Andral)
- "La paramusique dans le charivari français contemporain" (1981)
- "Musiques de rites saisonniers en Europe traditionnelle" (1982)
- "Le triangle et ses représentations comme signe social et culturel" (1987)

== Personal life ==
Marcel-Dubois died in 1989, at the age of 76, in Suresnes, Paris.
