= Mansour Nariman =

Iranian musician

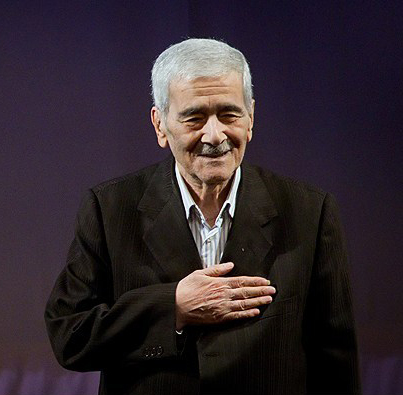

Eskandar Ebrahimi-Zanjani (Persian: اسکندر ابراهیمی زنجانی), better known by his stage name Mansour Nariman (Persian: منصور نریمان, 1935 in Mashhad − 14 July 2015 in Tehran) was an Iranian oud player, researcher and writer.

== Life and music ==
He was born with the real name of Iskandar Ebrahimi Zanjani in Mashhad. His father, who himself played the setar, tar and ney, took him under his training from his childhood and introduced him to the dastgah of Iranian music and taught him how to play the setar. Nariman started working with Radio Mashhad as a soloist at the age of fourteen, and after mastering the oud playing style, he started performing music with this instrument in some programs.

After working with Radio Mashhad for some time, he moved to Shiraz and continued his activity and cooperation in the field of music and performance with Radio Shiraz for four years. After he was introduced by master Abdul Wahab Shahidi as the official soloist of the radio, he continued his work in Tehran radio along with other masters such as Jalil Shahnaz, Farhang Sharif, Parviz Yahaghi and other soloists of that period.

In those years, there were very few musicians who played the oud, and if it was to be included in an orchestra, the tar player would play it. In general, oud was considered a secondary instrument of tar musicians.

Mansour Nariman was one of the first musicians who focused on this old Iranian instrument and made it his main instrument. Nariman said in his memoirs about how he learned to play the oud:

"I didn't have an oud teacher, I just listened to the radios of the neighboring countries and wrote a letter to the great Egyptian singer and musician Mohammad Abd al-Wahhab to Cairo Radio and asked him questions about tuning and some issues of this instrument and raised some issues; After some time, Abdul Wahab wrote in his reply to my letter that the tuning of the oud is the same as what you have done, and in short, he confirmed all my ideas."

It was after him that the oud, which had an Arabic flavour, gradually found a place in the orchestra of Iranian instruments and sometimes even a solo piece was assigned to it. In the years before the revolution, he performed a series of solo programs in Iran's National Radio and Television Organization together with Jahangir Malek.

In addition to trying to change the way of playing, which was influenced by Arab music and Arab oud players, Nariman believed that the Iranian oud is called Berbat or Berbat and its structure is different from the oud played in the Arab world.

Mansour Nariman was invited to teach oud in the music conservatory. In these years, he decided to write a book to teach this instrument. Among Nariman's other works, we can mention the book "42 Pieces for Oud" and "Radif for Barbat".

Mansour Nariman was married and had one son and three daughters. At the end of his life he was hospitalised due to a lung problem, and later died on at Bahman Hospital in Tehran.

== See also ==
- Music of Iran
