= Naseer Shamma =

Iraqi musician and oud player (born 1963)

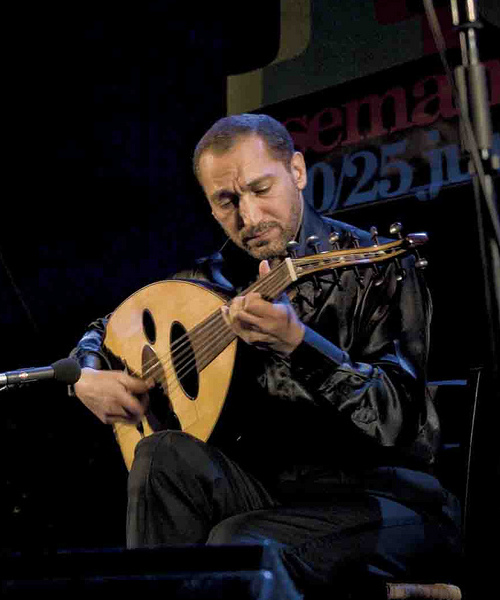
- Naseer Shamma in Córdoba, Spain, in 2011

Background information
- Born: 1963 (age 62–63); Kut, Iraq
- Origin: Iraq
- Genres: Music of Iraq, Arabic Music, Oud
- Occupation: Oud player
- Years active: 1987 - present
- Website: www.shammamusic.com

Naseer Shamma (Arabic: نصير شمه; born 1963) is an Iraqi musician and oud player.

== Life and career ==
He was born in 1963 in Kut, a city on the Tigris River. He began studying the oud at the age of 12 in Baghdad, following in the footsteps of Jamil and Munir Bashir. He received his diploma from the Baghdad Academy of Music in 1987. He began to teach oud after three years at the academy, as well as continuing his own studies. Shamma has composed music for films, plays and television and created the Arabic Oud House.

Among other recognitions, Shamma has been distinguished as UNESCO Artist for Peace and by the International Red Crescent and Red Cross Societies as goodwill ambassador.

In the 1980s, Shamma was accused by the Iraqi government of criticising Saddam Hussein. He was asked to visit the Iraqi embassy to Amman, where he was kidnapped and transported against his will to Iraq where he was imprisoned. He was interrogated for weeks, and was sentenced to death without a court hearing. He was ultimately released without any meaningful process. On February 11, 2024 Naseer Shamma, has launched his debut art exhibition, Half Life, at the Etihad Modern Art Gallery On September 1, 2024, Deputy Prime Minister Fuad Hussein met with UNESCO Artist of Peace Naseer Shamma to discuss the role of art in diplomacy, cultural exchange, and promoting Iraq’s heritage, while praising Shamma’s proposals and creative contributions to Iraq’s international cultural presence.

== Discography ==
- Le Luth de Bagdad (1994, Institut du Monde Arabe) (reissued as Le Luth de Bagdad - Histoire d’amour orientale)
- Ishraq (1996, Musicaimmagine)
- The Moon Fades (1999, Incognito)
- If Found (2004, Diwan)
- Maqamat Ziryáb (2005, Pneuma)
- Hilal (Crescent) (2006, Pneuma)
- Ard Al-Sawad (The Black Land or Land of Darkness) (2006, Diwan)
- Viaje De Las Almas (Travelling Souls) (2011, Pneuma)
- ABWAB (2024, United Arab Emirates)
- bab Al-hudour ( 2024 )

=== Cassettes ===
- Before I Get Crucified (1997)
- The Night of Baghdad (1997)
- Eastern Love Story (1997)
- Declaring My Love Silently (1997)
- For the Children of Iraq (1997)
- The Siege of Baghdad (2000)

=== Other ===
- Oud Naseer Shamma (2000, Abu Dhabi Cultural Foundation)
- The Fire This Time (2002, Hidden Art)
- Silk (2008, Abu Dhabi Festival)

== See also ==
- Arabic Lute House
- List of Iraqi artists
- Munir Bashir, contemporary Iraqi Oud musician.
- Kazem Al Sahir, an Iraqi singer, composer and songwriter.
