= Arabs in Denmark =

Total population
- 121,000

Regions with significant populations
- Copenhagen, Aarhus, Jutland

Languages
- Arabic and Danish

Religion
- Islam and Christianity

Related ethnic groups
- Arabs and Arab diaspora

Arabs in Denmark are Danish permanent residents of Arab descent, who originate from Arab countries. The largest number of Arabs in the country are Iraqis. The majority hail from Lebanon, Syria, Iraq, Palestine and Morocco followed by smaller groups from other Arab countries. They mainly live in Copenhagen, Aarhus and Jutland. There were 121,000 Arabs in Denmark as of 2017.

The Danish Statistical Office reported the following for Q1 2017:

Residents as of Q1 2017[1]	All	1st Generation	2nd Generation
Algeria	1,472	938	534
Comoros	31	17	14
Djibouti	65	22	43
Egypt	2,440	1,779	661
Eritrea	4,754	4,376	378
Libya	387	202	185
Morocco	11,150	5,660	5,490
Mauretania	40	29	11
Somalia	21,050	11,920	9,130
Tunisia	1 465	927	538
Bahrain	78	58	20
UAE	295	122	173
Iraq	31,902	21,383	10,519
Israel	1,538	1,284	254
Jordan	2,292	1,177	1,115
Kuwait	2,251	1,258	993
Lebanon	26,458	12,722	13,736
Oman	3	3	0
Qatar	84	22	62
Saudi Arabia	328	200	128
Syria	37,880	33,616	4,264
Yemen	308	166	142

== Notable people ==
- Adda Djeziri, footballer of Algerian descent
- Ahmad Abu Laban, imam and the leader of the organization of Palestinian descent
- Ahmad Kaddour, boxer of Lebanese descent
- Ahmed Akkari, teacher, author, former imam of Lebanese descent
- Aida Nadeem, musician of Iraqi descent
- Anja Al-Erhayem, filmmaker, born to Iraqi father and Danish mother
- Asmaa Abdol-Hamid, social worker and politician of Palestinian descent
- Basim, singer of Moroccan descent, represented Denmark in 2014 Eurovision Song Contest
- Dar Salim, film and television actor Iraqi descent
- Feras Agwa, rapper of mixed Egyptian-Syrian parents
- Ihan Haydar, drummer and Percussionist of Iraqi descent
- Mahmoud El-Hajj, footballer Palestinian and Lebanese descent
- Mohamed Ali, mixed Egyptian-Iraqi parents, singer who appeared on Denmark's X Factor
- Mustafa Hassan, footballer of Iraqi descent
- Naser Khader, politician of Syrian descent
- Osama Akharraz, football of Moroccan descent
- Souheib Dhaflaoui, footballer of Tunisian descent
- Tariq Hashim, director of Iraqi descent
- Yahya Hassan, poet, author and politician of Palestinian descent
- Youssef Toutouh, footballer of Moroccan descent
- Zeena Zaki, Iraqi fashion designer born in Copenhagen

== See also ==
- Arab diaspora
- Egyptian diaspora
- Immigration to Denmark
- Iraqi diaspora
- Iraqis in Denmark
- Islam in Denmark
- Lebanese diaspora
- Lebanese people in Denmark
- Moroccan diaspora
- Moroccans in Denmark
- Palestinian diaspora
- Syrian diaspora
- Syrians in Denmark
- Tunisian diaspora
- Algerians
