= Iraqis in Denmark =

Immigrants from Iraq to Denmark and their descendants

Total population
- 32,874 (2018)

Regions with significant populations
- Copenhagen, Jutland

Languages
- Danish, Mesopotamian Arabic also Kurdish (Sorani and Kurmanji dialects), Turkish (Iraqi Turkmen/Turkoman dialects), and Neo-Aramaic (Assyrian and Mandaic)

Religion
- Predominantly Islam (Shia and Sunni) and Christianity (Syriac Christianity and Catholic).

Related ethnic groups
- Iraqis, Kurds, Mandaeans, Assyrians

Iraqis in Denmark consist of both immigrants from Iraq to Denmark and their descendants, and may hold either Iraqi or Danish citizenship. Most Iraqis came to Denmark during the 1990s and were granted political asylum due to persecution by the Sunni Muslim regime.

== Demographics ==
With a total Iraqi population in Denmark numbering of 32,874, 21,802 have immigrated to Denmark, whereas 11,072 are descendants of immigrants. The population consists of a little more men than women at 54% of Iraqis living in Denmark being men. The Iraqi population living in Denmark is relatively young; 52% are below 30 years of age. The majority are living in the capital region. Compared to the location of residence of immigrants of all nationalities in Denmark, more Iraqis are living near Copenhagen and fewer are living in Northern Jutland. The Iraqis constitute the third largest group of non-Western immigrants living in Denmark. The number of Iraqis living in Denmark has been more or less constant the past decade, with only the number of descendants increasing with around 500 people per year Most Iraqis who are living in Denmark entered the country in the 1990s. The almost 20.000 Iraqis, who entered Denmark in the 1990s, were granted political asylum due to persecution by Saddam Hussein’s regime and internal clashes in the Kurdish part of Iraq. They are primarily Shia Muslims and Kurds. Since 2000 almost no Iraqis have been granted asylum in Denmark due to implementation of strict immigration policies.

There are organizations such as the Iraqi-Danish Culture Days, which is currently organized in the capital of Copenhagen. They are the largest Arab ethnic group living in Denmark. They mostly live in the capital Copenhagen, especially in the Nørrebro area.

Between 2009 and 2011, Iraqi nationals made up the largest group of unsuccessful asylum seekers in Denmark.

== Socioeconomics ==
According to Statistics Denmark, as of 2014, Iraq-born immigrants aged 30–64 in Denmark have an employment rate of approximately 31.9%. Iraq-born individuals aged 16–64 also have a self-employment rate of around 17%.

== Notable people ==
- Fenar Ahmad, filmmaker, producer
- Anja Al-Erhayem, filmmaker, born to Iraqi father and Danish mother
- Mohamed Ali, singer who appeared on Denmark's X Factor
- Tariq Hashim, director
- Aida Nadeem, musician
- Avar Raza, footballer
- Mustafa Hassan, footballer
- Ihan Haydar, drummer in the popband L.I.G.A

== See also ==
- Arabs in Denmark
- Denmark–Iraq relations
- Demographics of Denmark
- Iraqi diaspora
  - Iraqis in Finland
  - Iraqis in Norway
  - Iraqis in Sweden
