= Syriac sacral music =

Music of the Syriac Christianity liturgy

Syriac sacral music is music in the Syriac language as used in the liturgy of Syriac Christianity. Historically it is best known from and important for its part in the development of Christian sacred music

since Antiquity.

The Syriac churches have a musical system based on ancient principles today known as maqam. There are eight maqams used in the church and these are known as qadmoyo (maqam bayati, maqam ussak), trayono (maqam huseini), tlithoyo (maqam segah, maqam nahawand, maqam kurd), rbi'oyo (maqam rast), hmishoyo (maqam huzam), shtithoyo (maqam ajam), shbi'oyo (maqam saba) and tminoyo (maqam hijaz) (in order from one to eight). The predominant works of the Syriac Church's music were collected in an anthology called Beth Gazo (Psalms of the Treasury of Maqams). There are also musical psalms other than this repertoire of 700 psalms, among them are the Fenqitho of the Syriac Orthodox and Maronite Churches, as well as the Khudra of the Church of the East.

== Syrian hymnody ==
Karazūṯa d'Ḥašša
An Eastern syriac hymn sung by Hanna Petros, 1931.

To the general considerations of hymnody and hymnology must be added some bearing particularly on the structure and liturgical use of hymns (madrashe), exclusive of poetical homilies or discourses (mimre), which belong to the narrative and epic class, while the hymns are lyrical.

The chief basis of Syriac metre is fixed number of syllables of the verses, without distinction of long and short syllables, as in several modern languages. Verses of all lengths from two to twelve are known, but the metres most used in hymnody are dodecasyllabic verses of twelve syllables formed of three equal measures (4+4+4), heptasyllabic verses of seven syllables formed of two measures (4+3 or 3+4), and pentasyllabic verses of five syllables also formed of two measures (2+3 or 3+2). These verses may be employed alone or grouped in strophes, the latter form being most frequent in hymns composed of verses of five and seven syllables. A strophe is generally composed of equal verses, but it sometimes happens that the first of the last verse is in a different measure from the other verses of the strophe. All the strophes of a hymn are usually of the same construction.

Besides variety of metre and division into strophes, the Syrians prior to the ninth century knew no other artifice than the arrangement of acrostic poems. The acrostic played an important part, in Syriac hymnody and its use, especially the alphabetic acrostic, seems to have been introduced in imitation of the Psalms and the Lamentations of Jeremias. Sometimes the acrostic is linear, simple when each verse begins successively with one of the twenty-two letters of the Syriac alphabet, multiple, when two, three, or more verses begin with the same letter without, forming strophes; sometimes it is strophic, when each strophe is marked by a letter of the alphabet. This letter may be only at the beginning of the first verse or it may be repeated at the beginning of each verse of the strophe. introduced in imitation of the Psalms and the Lamentations of Jeremias. There may be two or more successive strophes beginning with the same letter, each letter regularly marking the same number of strophes throughout the poem, which thus consists of forty-four strophes, of sixty-six, or of any other multiple of twenty-two. The verbal acrostic is more rare. The name of Jesus Christ, of Mary, or the saint in whose honour the hymn is composed serves to form linear or strophic acrostics. St. Ephraem signed some of his poems with his acrostic.

From the ninth century the influence of Arabic poetry made itself felt in Syriac hymnody, especially by the introduction of rhyme, this manner of marking the final stroke of a verse had been hitherto unknown, the rare examples held to have been discovered among older authors being merely voluntary or fortuitous assonances. But the Syrians made varied use of rhyme. There are poems in which all the verses have the same rhyme as in the "Kasida" of the Arabs. In others, and these are more numerous, the verses of each strophe have a single rhyme that is not the same for all the strophes. In others the verses of a strophe rhyme among themselves, with the exception of the last, which repeats the rhyme of the first strophe like a refrain. In acrostic poems the rhyme is sometimes supplied by the corresponding letter of the alphabet; thus the first strophe rhymes with a, the second with b, etc. There may also be a different rhyme for the first two measures and for the last. These are the most frequent combinations, but there are others.

Most ancient Syriac hymns, e.g., those of St. Ephraem, Narses and Balai, although composed for one or two choirs, were not originally intended for liturgical use properly so called but addressed as much to the laity as to clerics, and date from a period when the codification of harmony was not yet regularly established.

The result of adapting these hymns to liturgical offices was that they underwent various modifications:

- In the assignment of authorship—the Syrian Jacobites and the Maronites in adopting those of Nestorian origin either suppressed the name of the author or substituted the name of one whom they considered orthodox, most frequently St. Ephraem
- In revision, those too long were shortened and heterodox expressions were modified—thus the term "Mother of Christ" was replaced by "Mother of God", etc.
- In general arrangement, especially by the addition of a refrain when there was none in the original.

Thus a hymn by St. Ephraem, the acrostic of which forms the name "Jesus Christ", begins with the strophe:

Jesus Our Lord the Christ
Has appeared to us from the bosom of His Father;
He has come to deliver us from darkness,
And to illumine us with his resplendent light.

It was preceded by the following distich, which forms the refrain:

Light is arisen upon the just
And joy for those who are broken-hearted.

Likewise a hymn of Narses on the Epiphany begins:

Error like darkness,
Was stretched over creatures;
The light of Christ is arisen
And the world possesses knowledge.
Its refrain is the following distich:
The light of the appearing of Christ
Has rejoiced the earth and the heavens.

Syriac Hymns do not occur only in the Office that correspond to the Roman Breviary; the Syrians also made use of them in various liturgical functions, such as funeral and marriage celebrations.

Simple hymns without refrain are called teshbuhte (glorifications); the name cala (voice) is given to the hymns in which each is preceded by a sentence (metrical or not) expressing a thought in conformity with that of the strophe. It is in a manner an invitation from the first choir to which the second replies by strophe, e.g.:

First choir: Open to me the gates of justice. Second choir: Open to us, Lord, the great treasure, (strophe of four verses). First choir: And I will enter to praise the Lord. Second choir: At the gate of thy mercies (etc., strophe of four verses). Sometimes the strophes are interspersed with versicles from the Psalms.

The hymns in the Syriac Office, which conclude the part known as sedra and replace the short prayers of the Nestorian Office, are called ba'utha (prayer, request). Most hymns of this class are in pentasyllabic verses and are the work of the poet Balai (d. about 450). They show great simplicity of thought and language and consist of two strophes, generally of six verses each, sometimes of four, as for example:

During forty days Moses fasted on the mountain: And with the splendor of its light His countenance shone. During forty days Ninive fasted: And the Lord was appeased, And annulled the sentence.

Instead of the ba'utha occasionally occurs a metrical composition called seblata (stairs), which are factitious arrangements of verses borrowed from various sources and arbitrarily arranged by those who co-ordinated or revised the offices, and are of no assistance in the study of Syriac hymnody. The sagitha is less frequently replaced by the augitha, a canticle in the form of a dialogue that recalls the "Victimae paschali" of the Roman Missal. All the poems of this kind known to us are of Nestorian origin, and are probably the work of Narses. They are uniformly constructed with an introduction and a dialogue; the introduction is composed of from five to ten strophes of four heptasyllabic verses; the dialogue between two persons or two groups of persons contains forty four strophes (twenty-two for each interlocutor) similar to those in the prologue and forming an alphabetic acrostic. These compositions of rather lively measure are stamped by a certain grace. The subject is adapted to the liturgical feast of the day; thus in the canticle for Christmas, the dialogue is between the Blessed Virgin and the Magi; for the Annunciation, between Gabriel and Mary; for the feast of Syrian Doctors, between Cyril and Nestorius, etc. These three kinds of hymns correspond to the three subjects that form their usual theme, praise, prayer, and instruction, but as has been said the last-named was chiefly imparted by the mimre.

Extensive study of Syriac hymnody would show whether there is any relationship between it and Byzantine hymnody, which hypothesis has had as many opponents as defenders; but this study is an undertaking fraught with difficulties, owing to the small number of documents published in satisfactory condition. Indeed, the knowledge of hymns supplied by editions of the liturgical books of Catholic Chaldeans, Syrians, or Maronites is inadequate for the reasons indicated above. The works of St. Ephraem, which contain a large number of them (authentic or apocryphal), have not been critically edited. The Nestorian Breviaries, which have most faithfully preserved the ancient texts, have never been printed and manuscripts are rare, while the collections of hymns apart from liturgical books are few and have not been sufficiently studied.

== Legacy ==
Melodies that originated in East-Syriac Rite and West-Syriac Rite rites in the Middle East have survived in Kerala.

== See also ==
- Beth Gazo
- Syrian Chant
