= Şerif Muhiddin Targan =

Turkish Arab classical musician

Şerif Muhiddin Targan (January 21, 1892 – September 13, 1967), also known as Sherif Muhiddin Haydar or Serif Muhiddin Haydar, was a Turkish Arab classical musician and oud player. His instrumental compositions for the oud departed from the traditional style to explore the limits of this instrument, technically challenging the performer.

He was born in Istanbul, Turkey in 1892, his father was Serif Ali Haydar Pasha, and his mother was Sabiha Hanim, his father's first wife. He began to learn the oud at the age of six, and subsequently took private music lessons in Istanbul – he made his first concert appearance when he was only 13 years old. In 1924 Targan moved to New York, where his music was also well received. In 1932 he returned to Istanbul, where he joined the Istanbul City Orchestra. At the invitation of the Iraqi government, he became the dean of the Baghdad Conservatory in 1936–37, which produced such famous oud players as the Assyrian brothers Munir Bashir and Jamil Bashir, as well as Salman Shukur and Ghanim Haddad. He married the famous Turkish singer Safiye Ayla in 1950 and died in 1967 in Istanbul.

He was good friends with John G. Bennett who refers to him as "Prens Muhittin Haydari" in his autobiography.

== See also ==
- Hanna Petros
