= Karim Wasfi =

Iraqi cellist (born 1972)

Karim Wasfi (born 1972) is an Iraqi cellist who is the chief conductor of the Iraqi National Symphony Orchestra.

Wasfi was born in Cairo in 1972 to an Egyptian mother and an Iraqi father, and spent his childhood in Baghdad. Growing up in a musical family, his mother was a pianist and researcher, while his father was an artist and actor. He studied music at the Music and Ballet School of Baghdad, and was assigned the cello at the age of six. In 1986, at the age of 14, he joined the Iraqi National Symphony Orchestra to further cultivate his musical talents.

In 2007, Wasfi was appointed as the chief conductor of the Iraqi National Symphony Orchestra.
