= Farida Mohammad Ali =

Iraqi singer

Farida Mohammad Ali (Arabic, فريدة محمد علي; born 1963) is an Iraqi singer known for her mastery of the Iraqi maqam and Arabic maqam styles. Since leaving Iraq in 1997, she lives in the Netherlands and performs Iraqi maqam with the Iraqi Maqam Ensemble.

== Early life ==
Farida Mohammad Ali was born in Kerbala, Iraq, in 1963.

She graduated from the Musical Institute & Academy of Fine Arts (Baghdad Conservatory), where she studied under oud master Munir Bashir. It was Bashir who encouraged her to perform classical Iraqi maqam, although women were generally discouraged from such study. She has also studied with Sha Ubi Ibrahim, Hussein Al-Athami, and Mohammad Gomar, and has had extensive training in both Iraqi and Arabic maqam.

== Career ==
Ali became the first female teacher of classical Iraqi Maqam, and taught singing at the Baghdad Conservatory.

From 1986 until 1989, she was a member of the Iraqi Musical Heritage Group, and became a member of the Iraqi Artists Union in 1987.

She left Iraq in 1997. She married Mohammad Gomar, player of the djozza, and was living in the Netherlands.

She performs regularly in the Iraqi Maqam Ensemble. The ensemble was established in 1989 in Baghdad by Mohammad H.Gomar to continue the 1973 ensemble organized by the prominent oud teacher Munir Bashir. All members completed their studies at the Musical Institute & Academy of Fine Arts in Iraq.

She performed in International Mystic Music Sufi Festival in Karachi, Pakistan in 2007.

== Recognition ==
Ali is the recipient of many honours, including:

- 2003: Selected by the Iraqi Ministry of Culture, Institute of Musical Studies, and the Iraqi Maqam House as the holder of the foremost position of the traditional Iraqi Maqam in the 20th century
- 2005: Al Ankaa Medal
- 2005: Medal Al-Gubbanchi, at the First International Festival, Kurdistan, Iraq
- 2006: Medal at the 1st Forum International "Expressions Artistiqes & Soufisme" at Mostaganem, Algeria
- 2007: Medal Algeria (Algeria was the Capital of Arab Culture in 2007)

== In film ==
Ali appears in the 2015 documentary film On the Banks of the Tigris, by filmmaker Marsha Emerman and Iraqi-Australian writer and actor Majid Shokor. The film was awarded Best Documentary Film at the Baghdad International Film Festival that year.

== Discography ==
All credited as "Farida and the Iraqi Maqam Ensemble"

- Classical Music of Iraq (Music and Words, 1998)
- Iraqi Mawal & maqam (produced by Samarkand company in the Netherlands 2000)
- Departure (Produced by the Dutch company Soly Luna 2001)
- Tradition (Produced by Munir Bashir Foundation 2002)
- Voice of Mesopotamia (Produced By Long Distance France, 2003)
- Baghdad Eternity (Poems & Maqamat) (Produced by Iraqi Maqam Foundation 2004)
- Ishraqaat (Produced by Snail Records 2005)

== See also ==
- Music of Iraq
