= Hanna Petros =

Assyrian composer and musical scholar (1896 – 1958)

Hanna Petros ܚܢܐ ܦܛܪܘܣ حنا بطرس
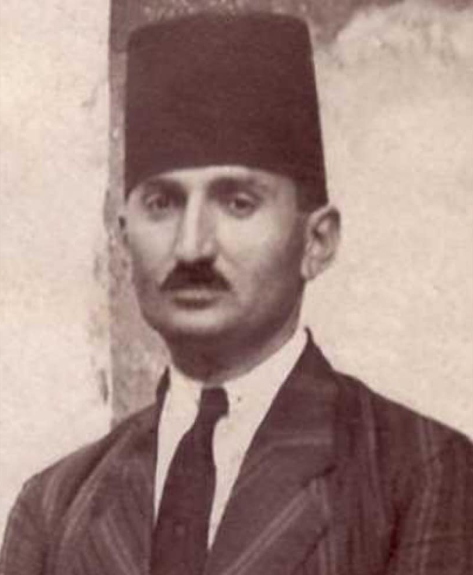
- Photographed image of Petros

Background information
- Born: 1896; Mosul, Ottoman Empire
- Origin: Baghdad, Iraq
- Died: 1958 (aged 62) (First Republic of Iraq) Baghdad, Iraq
- Genres: Syriac sacral music, Iraqi Maqams
- Occupation(s): Composer, singer, songwriter
- Years active: 1920s–1950s

Hanna Petros (Syriac: ܚܢܐ ܦܛܪܘܣ, Arabic: حنا بطرس) (1896 – 1958) was an Iraqi composer and a scholar. He wrote numerous books and treatises on oriental music, Iraqi Maqams and Syriac hymnody, and established a renowned conservatory in Baghdad. He is well known for creating the first musical records in Assyrian Neo-Aramaic and for pioneering musical performance and composition in Iraq.

== Life and career ==
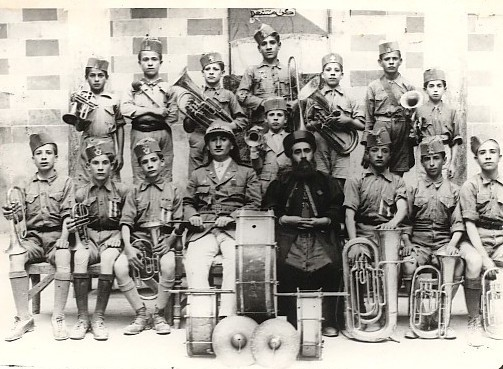
1921 photo showing Hanna Petros at the Chaldean School in Mosul. He is sitting fourth from the left.

Hanna Petros was an ethnic Assyrian, born to a Chaldean Catholic family in Mosul in 1896. After finishing preparatory school, he studied oriental music at the hands of an Ottoman army officer from 1914 to 1918 and was shortly employed at the Ottoman military band in 1918. He subsequently worked as an instructor for scouting groups in Mosul in 1921, where he would also compose an anthem for the city. Later in 1924, he was asked to compose music for the Iraqi army's marching bands, and the following year, he would begin teaching music in Baghdad.

Petros' main attention was concentrated on oriental music, composing pieces in both Iraqi Maqams and Syriac sacral music. In 1931, Petros released two phonograph records under His Master's Voice, titled "Baydakh d'Aturaye" and "Karuzuta d-Hasha". The first record contained Assyrian nationalist songs while the second contained Syriac sacral hymns.

In 1936, Petros was asked to establish the Baghdad Conservatory which quickly drew musicians who gained fame such as Jamil Bashir and later his brother Munir Bashir. Şerif Muhiddin Targan was later appointed as the conservatory's dean and Hanna Petros continued to play a major role in the conservatory. It was then that he wrote most of his books. Moreover, he often appeared on the national radio to perform some of his musical works. In 1941, Petros founded the Iraqi Police Music Band.

Petros also served as a deacon in the Chaldean Catholic Church. During his life, he also published many literary works regarding music, including Principals of Music Theory and The Book of National Anthems.

Petros died after a heart attack in 1958 at the age of 62, and was buried in Baghdad. His music would later serve as inspiration for other Assyrian musicians, such as Gibrail Sayad.

"Sermon of Sadness" (ܟܪܙܘܬܐ ܕܚܫܐ).
A Syriac hymn sung by Hanna Petros, 1931.

== Personal life and death ==
In 1929, Petros married Maryam Daoud Martha from Mosul and had four children, namely Bassam Hanna Petros, who would also become a musician. He was also fluent in Arabic, Assyrian Neo-Aramaic, French, Turkish, and English.

Petros died after a heart attack in 1958 at the age of 64, and was buried in Baghdad.

== Discography ==
=== As composer/performer ===
- Caruzutha d Hasha (Qdom Shapir, Hymn, 1931)
- Geyassa (Hymn, 1931)
- Baydagh d-Ature (National Song, 1931)
- Bmani Mnawnakh (National Song, 1931)
