= Salman Shukur =

Salman Shukur was born in 1921 in Baghdad, Iraq, where he died in 2007. He studied oud under Sherif Muheddin Haydar at the Baghdad Conservatory. Later, he became Professor of oud and the head of the Oriental Music Department at the Institute founded by Sharif Muheddin, and held that post for 30 years. He was also Artistic Advisor for the Iraqi Ministry of Information. He performed frequently for Iraqi radio and television, and performed in concert in China, Iran, Egypt, Germany, England, and the United States. He has performed publicly as recently as 1997. He made only one full-length recording, for Decca Headline, "Salman Shukur - oud", HEAD 16 PSI, recorded in Rosslyn Hill Chapel in London in 1976 by James Mallinson and Stanley Gooddall, notes by John Haywood, released in 1977, and a brief excerpt of his solo oud performance in Rast Iraq can be heard on the Tangent Record series Music In The World Of Islam: Lutes (re-issued by Topic Records).

For this recording, Salman Shukur used an oud built by the son of Ustad Ali, Mohammad Ali. It features six courses, and the lowest-pitched single string is in the lowest physical place when the oud is played so the string order is 2, 3, 4, 5, 6, 1. Like Jamil Bashir he tuned the instrument very high - from G to G - instead of the traditional C to C. It has a traditional glued-to-the-face bridge, to which the strings are tied. Like many students of Sherif Muheddin Haydar, Salman Shukur uses a plectrum some of the time, and all four fingers of his right hand some of the time, when playing.
