= Beth Gazo =

Syriac Christian sacral music book

Beth Gazo (ܒܶܝܬ̥ ܓܰܙܳܐ [bɛθ ɡɐːzo]; literary "the house of treasure") is a Syriac liturgical book that contains a collection of Syriac chants and melodies. The book is considered a reference of Syriac Hymnody and without it clerics belonging to the West Syriac Tradition cannot perform their liturgical duty. There exist modern varieties of this book with different names such as: beṯ gázo dqinóṯo (ܒܝܬ ܓܙܐ ܕܩܝܢ̈ܬܐ), beṯ gázo dzimróṯo (ܒܝܬ ܓܙܐ ܕܙܡܪ̈ܬܐ) and beṯ gázo dneʻmóṯo (ܒܝܬ ܓܙܐ ܕܢܥܡ̈ܬܐ).

== History ==
The origin of Beth Gazo can be traced back to the early centuries of Christianity going as far as Bardaisan (154–222 CE). However, the bulk of the hymns is attributed to Ephrem the Syrian (306 – 373 CE).

There are two main traditions in chanting: western based on the School of Mardin and eastern in Tikrit formerly. There is a daily breviary found in the Syriac Orthodox Church called "Shehimo: Book of Common Prayer" where the West Syriac style of chants and melodies from Beth Gazo are followed.

== Contents ==
The abridged version of Beth Gazo contain the following hymns:

1. Qole shahroye (ܩܠܐ ܫܗܪܝܐ) "vigils". These were sung by those belonging to the order of shahroye "vigilants". they are dedicated to the Virgin, the saints, to penitence and the departed.
2. Gushmo (ܓܫܡܐ) "body". Each of which consists of eight modes. These are recited during the daily offices known as šḥimo (ܫܚܝܡܐ).
3. Sebeltho d'madroshe (ܣܒܠܬܐ ܕܡܕܪܫܐ) "ladder of hymns". It is this category that seems to have mostly inherited Ephrem's.
4. Fardo (ܦܪܕܐ) "single". These are short hymns divided into eight collections corresponding to the eight Syriac maqams.
5. Qonuno yawnoyo (ܩܢܘܢܐ ܝܘܢܝܐ) "Greek canon". Divided into eight collections.
6. Mawrbo (ܡܘܪܒܐ) "magnificat". Dedicated to the Virgin Mary.
7. Qole ghnize (ܩܠܐ ܓܢܝܙܐ) "mystic hymns". Those were lost.
8. Takheshphotho rabuloyotho (ܬܟܫܦܬܐ ܪܒܘܠܐܬܐ) "litanies of Rabula". Attributed to Rabbula bishop of Edessa.
9. Tborto (ܬܒܝܪܬܐ) "broken". They fall into three categories: those attributed to St. Jacob of Serug, St. Ephrem the Syrian and of St. Balai of Qenneshrin.
10. Quqlion (ܩܘܩܠܝܘܢ) "cycles". These are cycles from the Psalms.
