= Denmark–Iraq relations =

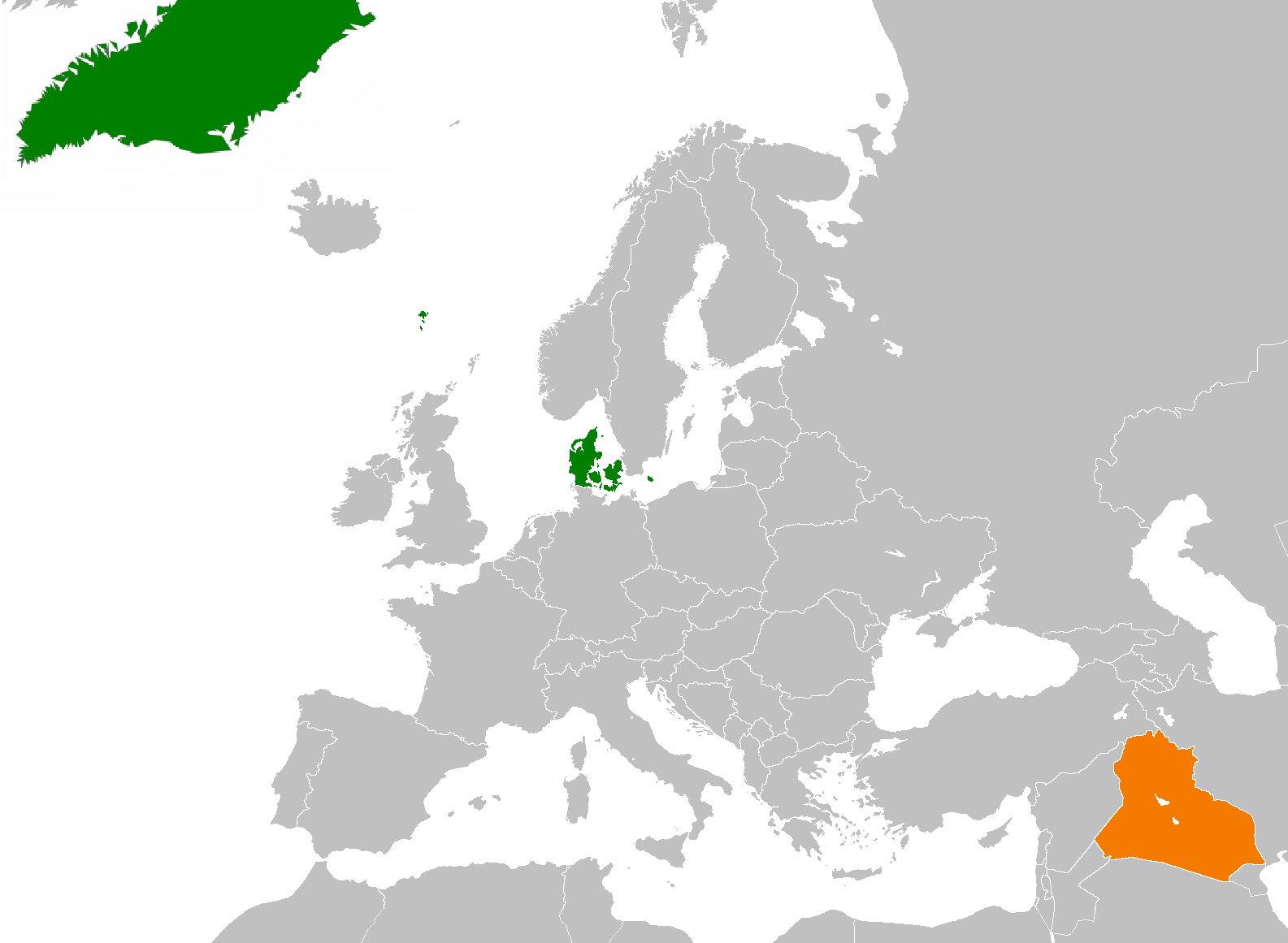
- Denmark: Iraq

Denmark–Iraq relations are foreign relations between Denmark and Iraq. The Danish embassy in Baghdad closed on 31 May 2024. Denmark has a trade office in Basra; Iraq has an embassy in Copenhagen.

On March 21, 2003, the Danish Parliament decided to support U.S. military action in Iraq and contribute naval assets to the war.

In 2006, the Iraqi Transport Minister Salam al-Malki announced a freeze on all economic relations with Danish and Norwegian companies in protest against insulting cartoons published in the countries' newspapers.

With the total Iraqi population in Denmark numbering around 29,600, there are organizations such as the Iraqi-Danish Culture Days, which are currently organized in the Danish capital Copenhagen.

== Iraqi reaction to the Jyllands-Posten Muhammad cartoons controversy ==
Shia cleric Grand Ayatollah Ali al-Sistani condemned the cartoons but also commented about militants who discredit Islam by their acts. Sistani underlined how un-Islamic acts of extremism are used as justification to attack Islam.

== See also ==
- Foreign relations of Denmark
- Foreign relations of Iraq
- Iraqis in Denmark
- Dancon/Irak
- Iraq–European Union relations
