= Baghdad Conservatory =

Former music school in Baghdad, Iraq

- Type: Music school
- Established: 1936; 90 years ago
- Founders: Hanna Petros
- Location: Baghdad, Iraq

The Baghdad Conservatory, also known as Iraqi Music Institute, Baghdad Institute of Music, or Musical Institute & Academy of Fine Arts, was a music conservatory in Baghdad, Iraq.

== History ==
Assyrian Iraqi composer and scholar Hanna Petros founded the institution in 1936. Şerif Muhiddin Targan was later appointed dean, but Petros continued to play a major role in the conservatory.

The conservatory has produced such famous oud players as Munir Bashir, his brother Jamil Bashir (who both taught there), Salman Shukur, Ghanim Haddad, and Rahim AlHaj, who studied under Munir and Jamil Bashir as well as and composer and oud player Salim Abdul Kareem.

The Iraqi maqam singer Farida Mohammad Ali studied singing at the college, and also taught there in the 1990s. She was the first female teacher.

In 2004, when Rahim AlHaj visited the city, after the 2003 invasion of Iraq, he found the conservatory burnt out and empty.

== Related institution ==
The Baghdad College of Fine Arts, part of the University of Baghdad, has its origins in the conservatory.

== See also ==
- Music and Ballet School of Baghdad
- Music of Iraq
