= Qinnasrin =

Archaeological site

- قنسرين (Arabic)
- Location within Syria
- 35°59′15″N 37°2′34″E
- Location: Syria
- Region: Aleppo Governorate

Qinnašrīn (Arabic: قنسرين, romanized: Qinnašrīn; Syriac: ܩܢܫܪܝܢ, romanized: Qennešrin, lit. 'Nest of Eagles'; Latin: Chalcis ad Belum; Ancient Greek: Χαλκὶς, romanized: Khalkìs) was a historical town in northern Syria. The town was situated 25 km (16 mi) southwest of Aleppo on the west bank of the Queiq (historically, the Belus) and was connected to Aleppo with a major road during Roman times.

Some scholars propose that the ruins of Qinnašrīn are located at al-Hadher to the east of the Queiq River, while Chalcis' location was at the modern Syrian village of Al-Iss, Aleppo Governorate to the west of the river. Others think that Qinnasrin has always been located at al-Iss from the Hellenistic to the Ayyubid period.

== History ==
=== Hellenistic and Roman periods ===
According to Appian, Chalcis was founded by Seleucus I Nicator (reigned 305-281 BC), and named after Chalcis in Euboea. Chalcis was distinguished from Chalcis sub Libanum (modern Anjar, Lebanon) by its river, the ancient Belus. The river—but not the city (Note: Contra sources such as Phenix.)—was named for the Semitic god Bel or Baʿal. In 92 AD, Chalcis received the title "Flavia", in honor of Emperor Domitian, to be known as "Flavia of the Chalcidonese".

=== Late Roman and Byzantine period ===
The city was a Christian bishopric from an early stage, at first a suffragan of Seleucia Pieria, but later raised to the dignity of autocephalous archdiocese. The names of several of its bishops are known, from that of 3rd-century Tranquillus to that of Probus, who lived at the end of the 6th century and whom Emperor Mauritius Tiberius sent as his envoy to the Persian king Chosroes I.

In Late Antiquity, it belonged to the province of Syria Prima. Its importance was due to its strategic location, both as a caravan stop and as part of the frontier zone (limes) with the desert. In 540, the Sassanid shah Khosrau I appeared before the city and extracted 200 pounds of gold as ransom in return for sparing the city. This prompted the Emperor Justinian I to order its fortifications rebuilt, a work undertaken by Isidore the Younger (a nephew of Isidore of Miletus) in c. 550.

The Sassanids occupied the city in 608/9, during the Byzantine–Sassanid War of 602–628, and kept it until the war's end.

=== Early Islamic period ===
Barely ten years later, in 636/7, it was conquered by the Arabs after a brief resistance. The Arab general Khalid ibn al-Walid took up residence in the city thereafter. The Umayyad caliph Yazid I (r. 680–683) ordered its walls to be demolished. He or his father and predecessor Mu'awiya I (r. 661–680) made Qinnasrin the center of its own jund (military district), called Jund Qinnasrin, within the greater administrative region of Islamic Syria. They utilized the city as an important army headquarters, though until the mid-10th century there were no recorded events of significance relating to Qinnasrin.

By 943, during Hamdanid rule, Qinnasrin was noted as one of northern Syria's most well-built cities, though it lost its paramountcy in Jund Qinnasrin to nearby Aleppo. The Hamdanid emir of Aleppo Sayf al-Dawla was defeated at Qinnasrin by the Ikhshidids of Egypt in 945. During the second half of the 10th century, the city became a frequent conflict zone between the Byzantines and Hamdanids during the latter stages of the Arab–Byzantine wars. Upon news of an impending Byzantine assault, the inhabitants evacuated in 963 though they returned afterward. Three years later, Sayf al-Dawla made a stand against the Byzantine emperor Nikephoros II Phokas at Qinnasrin, but ultimately retreated and evacuated its residents, after which the Byzantines set fire to its mosques. The inhabitants then made their abode partly in areas east of the Euphrates and partly in Aleppo. Within several years, Qinnasrin was repopulated but destroyed again by the Byzantines in 998. It was rebuilt, but once more sacked by the Byzantines in 1030.

The Persian geographer Nasir Khusraw passed through in 1047 and mentioned Qinnasrin was an impoverished village. Toward the end of the 11th century, Qinnasrin was rebuilt by the Seljuq ruler of Anatolia Sulayman ibn Qutulmish. However, the city was destroyed by his Seljuq rival from Damascus, Tutush I (r. 1078–1092). It remained as a barely populated, but strategic town during the Crusader period. In 1119, the Artuqid emir Ilghazi made it into an arms depot from which he raided the surrounding areas of Ruj, Jabal Summaq and Harim.

=== Ottoman period ===
The region was known as Eski Haleb, 'Old Aleppo' during the Ottoman era.

== See also ==
- Balai of Qenneshrin
- Jund Qinnasrin
- Seleucia near Belus, a Syrian town on a different River Belus
- Iamblichus, Neoplatonist philosopher and theurgist
