= Rahim AlHaj =

Iraqi-American oud musician and composer

Rahim AlHaj رحيم الحاج
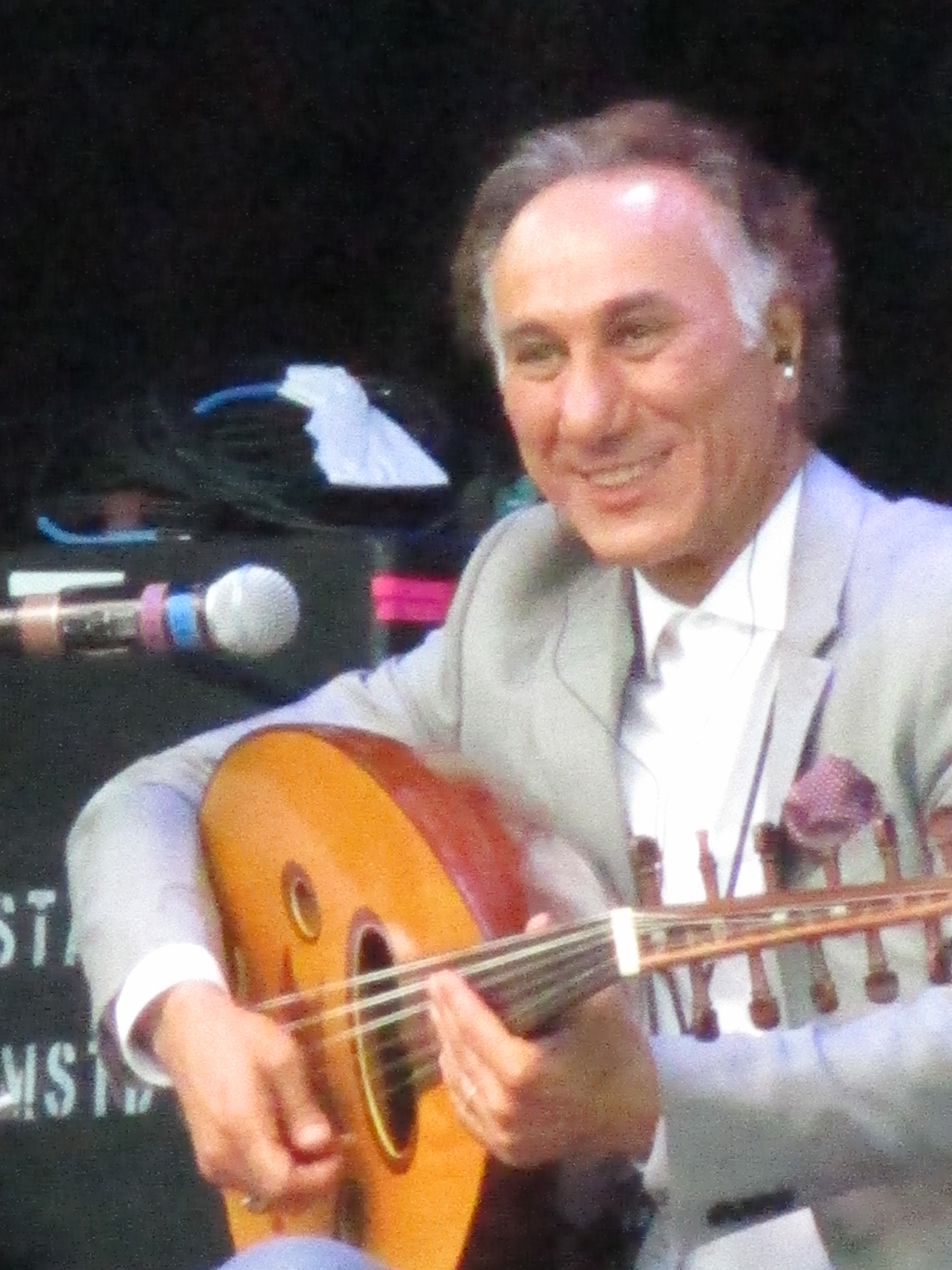
- AlHaj in 2016

Background information
- Born: Baghdad, Iraq
- Occupations: Musician; Composer; Actor
- Instrument(s): Oud, violin
- Years active: 1988-Present
- Website: www.rahimalhaj.com

Rahim AlHaj (Arabic: رحيم الحاج) is an Iraqi American musician and actor, known for his mastery of the oud. He formed the musical group Little Earth Orchestra, which blends western instruments with Arabic styles of music. He also stars in the 2025 drama film, The President's Cake.

== Early life and education ==
Rahim AlHaj was born in Baghdad, Iraq. He began playing the oud at age nine, and performed his first solo concert aged 14.

AlHaj entered a six-year-program at the Baghdad Conservatory (Note: Sometimes referred to as the Institute of Music.) in 1984, graduating with a degree in music composition in 1990. There he studied under renowned oud player Munir Bashir, as well as his brother, composer Jamil Bashir, and composer and oud player Salim Abdul Kareem.

He also studied and received a degree in Arabic literature at Mustansiriya University.

== Activism and immigration ==
AlHaj used his music to criticise the regime of Saddam Hussein, and was imprisoned twice in the late 1980s. He refused to join the ruler's Ba'ath Party, which limited his professional opportunities.

In 1991, after the first Gulf War, his mother sold almost everything she had to raise money to obtain false identity papers for her son so that he could leave Iraq. AlHaj left Iraq, moving initially to Jordan and then Syria, where he met and married Nada Kherbik. The couple moved to the U.S. in 2000 as a political refugee, settling in Albuquerque, New Mexico. He became a U.S. citizen on August 16, 2008. He only saw his mother alive one more time, when he visited Iraq in 2004.

== Career ==
=== Music ===
Having had to leave his beloved instrument behind when he left Iraq, fearing for his life, he later obtained one made by a childhood friend, which he continues to play.

AlHaj has performed all over the world, on tour with his teacher Munir Bashir, as well as solo and with his string quartet project, including numerous concerts in Lebanon, Iraq, Syria, Jordan, Morocco, Tunisia, Kuwait, Bahrain, Egypt, and France and hundreds of concerts in the United States.

AlHaj's albums The Second Baghdad, released in 2002, and Iraqi Music in a Time of War, released in 2003, were both produced by VoxLox record label. His East-meets-West CD entitled Friendship (with the Oud & Sadaqa Quartet) was released in December 2005 by Fast Horse Recordings. His When the Soul is Settled: Music of Iraq, produced by Smithsonian Folkways, was released in June 2006, and nominated for a 2008 Grammy Award.

In 2009, AlHaj formed the Little Earth Orchestra, which blends western instruments with Arabic modes. The group comprised Rahim's regular percussionist Issa Malluf, Michael Glynn (double bass), Katie Harlow (cello), Carla Kountoupes (violin), Jason Parris (viola), and Roberta Arruda (violin). In 2010, the two-CD album Little Earth was released. It features AlHaj's original compositions, performed by the Little Earth Orchestra in collaboration with jazz guitarist Bill Frisell, accordionist Guy Klucevsek, Peter Buck of the rock band R.E.M., Cape Verdean singer Maria de Barros, Chinese-Canadian pipa player Liu Fang, Native American musician Robert Mirabal, Iranian ney master Hossein Omoumi, Santa Fe Guitar Quartet, Mali kora player Yacouba Sissoko, American didgeridoo player Stephen Kent, and others.

He has also recorded and performed with many other musicians, including Indian sarod master Amjad Ali Khan, and the Seattle Symphony. He has composed many pieces for solo oud, string quartet, and symphony. His music has been featured on NPR's Studio 360 and frequently played on Amy Goodman's Democracy Now! platforms.

AlHaj's music delicately combines traditional Iraqi maqams with contemporary styling and influence.

=== In film ===
AlHaj wrote and performed the music for the award-winning short documentary, The Rest of My Life: Stories of Trauma Survivors.

He featured in the documentary XXI Century in 2003.

AlHaj appears as Jasim, a compassionate mailman, in the 2025 feature film The President's Cake, directed by Hasan Hadi. The film is set in Iraq under Saddam Hussein in 1990.

== Recognition and awards ==
- 1988: Music Institute (Baghdad Conservatory) Award for Composition
- 2001: Award from Veterans for Peace for work towards peace
- 2003: Winner of the Bravo Award for Excellence in Music
- 2008: Grammy nomination for Best Traditional World Music Album, for When the Soul is Settled: Music of Iraq
- 2009: United States Artists Fellow Award in Music
- 2010: Grammy nomination for Best Traditional World Music Album, for Ancient Sounds (UR Music, 2010)
- 2015: Recipient of a National Heritage Fellowship awarded by the National Endowment for the Arts

== Discography ==
- The Second Baghdad (2002)
- Iraqi Music in a Time of War (2003; live album)
- Friendship: Oud and Sadaqa String Quartet (2005)
- When the Soul is Settled: Music of Iraq (Smithsonian Folkways Recordings, 2006/7)
- Home Again (UR Music, 2008)
- Under the Rose (2009)
- Little Earth (2010)
- Ancient Sounds (UR Music, 2010)
- Letters from Iraq
- Journey, a retrospective, with one new track (2014)
- Infinite Hope (2015), feat. Indian sarod master Amjad Ali Khan
- One Sky, feat. Iranian santour master Sourena Sefati (Smithsonian Folkways Recordings, 2018)

== See also ==
- Music of Iraq
