= Omar Bashir (musician) =

Iraqi-Hungarian musician of Assyrian descent

Omar Bashir عمر بشير
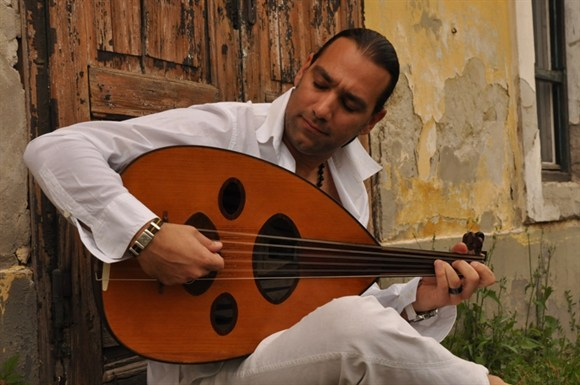
- The Crazy Oud 2010

Background information
- Born: May 1, 1970 (age 56); Budapest, Hungary
- Origin: Mosul, Iraq
- Genres: World music
- Occupation: Musician
- Instruments: Oud, guitar, piano
- Years active: 1990s–present
- Labels: EMI, INEDIT
- Website: www.omarbashir.hu

Omar Bashir (Arabic: عمر بشير) is an Iraqi-Hungarian musician. He is the son of Munir Bashir, who is widely considered to be one of the most important virtuosos in the history of the oud and a master of the modal tradition of Arabic maqam, as well as the nephew of expert oud player Jamil Bashir.

Omar performed both as a soloist and alongside his father Munir until the death of Munir in 1997. Throughout his career, he's traveled around the world and performed at concerts in many different countries, including in the Middle East and North America. His music blends traditional Arabic music and improvisation with other musical influences, such as jazz, flamenco music, and Hungarian Romani Music. In particular, he's performed extensively across various states in the United States, including New York, Washington, Arkansas, Colorado, and others. He has graced numerous prestigious venues such as the Cambridge Academy, Lincoln Jazz Theater, Symphony Space, Duke University, the World Culture Museum, and the Kennedy Center.

Omar holds a distinct place in modern oud music; as an heir to the Bashir family of oudists, he considers himself to be one of the last heirs to his family's music.

== Early life ==
Omar Bashir was born in Budapest in 1970. His father, Munir Bashir (a famous oud player of Assyrian ethnicity), had settled in the city and married a Hungarian woman. He began playing the oud with his father at the age of five after he moved to Baghdad, and performed his first 15 minute solo when he was 9 years old. He later attended the Baghdad Music and Ballet School where he eventually became a teacher. He also formed the Al Bayariq ensemble of 24 musicians, which toured many countries around the world.

Omar described his early life learning music as strict, with his father playing many different kinds of music under tough instruction. However, he has stated how he's since used his father's lessons to remember his roots and to guide his career to creating the best music possible. Stating in 2019, “My father viewed ego as the biggest enemy of any musician...Once a person starts to believe his own hype it spoils his work, and my father made sure that would not happen with me.”

In 1991, he returned to Budapest and joined the Franz Liszt Academy, where he learned classical guitar and Western-influenced music. He and his father would continue to perform together until the latter's death in 1997, including a duet titled Duo de Oud which received high acclaim. In the same year, Omar formed the Omar Bashir Trio, alongside Hungarian guitarists Andreas and Bálint Petz, and would perform with the two on several of his early albums.

== Career ==
=== Comments on Arabic music ===
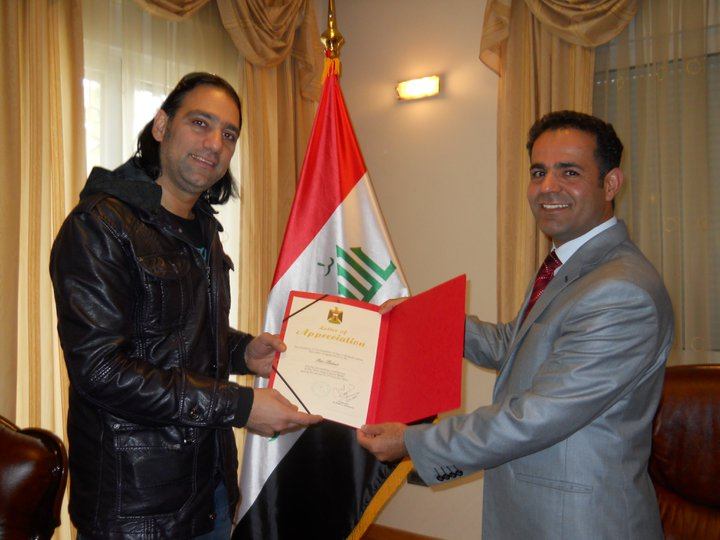
Omar receiving a certificate of appreciation from the Iraqi government

In the past, Omar has spoken about the developments of larger Arabic music and its combination with Western influences. In an interview with Al Jadid, he discussed how he believed that only certain elements of Western music could fit with Arabic, and that introducing more did more harm than good. Omar has also been critical about the exposure that artists received, lamenting that certain musicians received less exposure and attention than those who were involved in preserving musical traditions, such as that of the oud.

While touring for his 2019 album, The Dancing Oud, Omar had made comments expressing his criticism over the state of Arabic music. stated in an interview with The National, "These so-called music channels helped create this insidious concept that music is leisure and that it is a form of entertainment...Once that became accepted by the artists and the people, then naturally the quality decreased. We are at this stage now where what is being produced is ultimately safe and satisfying."

Around the same time, Omar had stated in an interview with Laha Magazine that critics who accused him of distorting Arabic music had gone on to imitate him, confirming that he developed his own unique style of oud playing.

=== Performances ===
Omar has performed many different concerts around the world throughout his career. In 2003, as part of a United States tour dedicated to his late father, Omar held a performance at the National Museum of Asian Art where he performed improvisations of his father's songs.

In 2016, Omar took part in a concert in his native Hungary, performing a style of music with Iraqi and Hungarian influences, some of which were inspired by Hungarian composer Béla Bartók. The following year, he performed a concert at the Royal Opera House in Muscat, Oman alongside Iraqi American trumpeter Amir ElSaffar.

In 2019, he took part in the Baalbek International Festival in Lebanon, playing melodies inspired by his Iraqi heritage. He considered the festival to be the most important in the field of Arabic music and art.

In 2023, Omar took part in an Iraqi Folklore concert at the Prague Conservatory with Iraq's Ambassador to the Czech Republic, Falah Abdulhasan Abdulsada, present at the event.

=== Support for Palestine ===
Omar has previously expressed his support for Palestinians in the wake of continuous human rights violations by Israel. In 2009, he held a charity performance in Amman, Jordan dedicated to the Gaza Strip, and played a number of melodies in memoriam of those who faced rights violations. He has also been critical of many Arab musicians in the past for singing on Palestine while withholding concerts in the Occupied Palestinian territories.

In 2010, Omar was the face of public controversy after participating in a show titled "Jerusalem, Capital of Peace" in Morocco. The show itself faced accusations of normalizing relations with Israel, and Omar was replaced with a Moroccan artist instead. He was critical about the comments that were directed towards him, stating that many artists from all around the world were coming to participate and that he was against Zionism, yet the concert had nothing to do with the politics of West Asia and a potential normalization of relations with Israel.

Omar previously turned down an offer of $1 million to teach at Israeli universities.

== Personal life ==
Omar has previously commented that his career as an oudist prevented him from getting married and being able to start a family. Speaking to Independent Arabia, Omar discussed how he had held a party with an Algerian woman to draw media attention away from him, and that he had married an Iraqi-Dutch woman only to separate from her later on.

== Discography ==
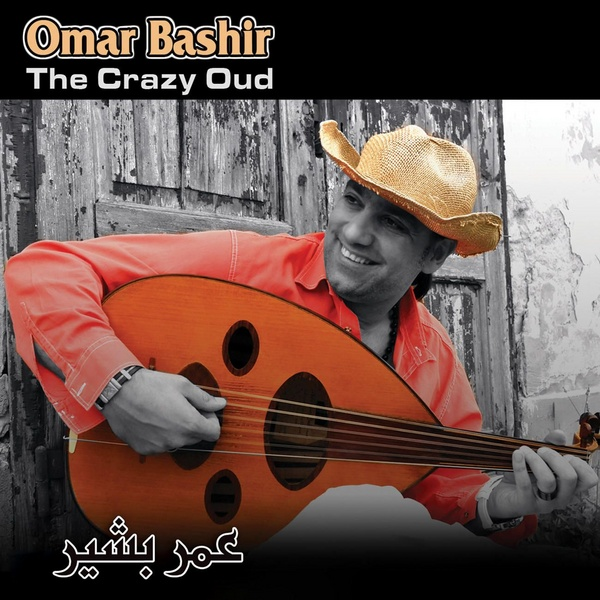
Cover of Bashir's 2010 album, The Crazy Oud

Omar Bashir has released a total of 23 CDs as a solo artist, as well as several albums recorded with his father and other musicians. His album Crazy Oud was released in 2010 by EMI and topped the charts in several Arab countries. Below is a chronological listing of his solo discography:

- Music from Iraq - 1992
- From the Euphrates to the Danube - 1997, a fusion of oud and Western music. The title references the rivers near where he grew up and was born, respectively.
- My Memories - 1998, featuring oud and percussion instruments
- Flamenco Night - 1998, recording of Omar's last concert with his father before the latter's passing
- Duet de Oud - 1998
- Al Andalus - 1999, produced by Shahin Production in Lebanon
- Zikrayati - 1999, meaning "my memories," performed on oud with percussion
- Ashwaq - 1999, a solo oud performance
- Live Solo Oud Performance - 2000, recorded in Beirut
- Maqam - 2000
- To My Father - 2002, oud and percussion improvisations on pieces performed with his father
- Sound of Civilizations - 2002, in Buddha Bar style
- Baghdadiyat with Shara Taha - 2002
- Gypsy Oud - 2003, blending oud with Hungarian Gypsy music
- Latin Oud - 2004, first rendition of Latin tunes on oud
- Oud Hawl al Alam ("Oud Around the World") - 2004, debuted live in Budapest, pioneering oud and guitar combination
- The Crazy Oud - 2010, diverse styles including Iraqi maqam, rumba, flamenco, blues, ambient, classical, folklore, and improvisation
- The Platinum Collection - EMI 2011
- Masters of Oud - 2010, duets by Munir and Omar Bashir, released by EMI, including remixes "Baghdad Blues - Desert Launch", "Mesopotamix" and "Café du Paris"
- Takasim - 2012, solo oud recording produced by INEDIT Records
- The Legend Live Concert - 2015 Universal Company
- The Dancing Oud - 2019, won award for "Best Sales" from Universal Music MENA
