= Music and Ballet School of Baghdad =

School in Baghdad, Iraq

- Arabic: مدرسة بغداد للموسيقى و الباليه

Information
- Established: 1968; 58 years ago
- Gender: Mixed
- Age: 6 to 18
- Enrollment: c.586 (2018)

The Music and Ballet School of Baghdad (Arabic: مدرسة بغداد للموسيقى و الباليه) is a music and ballet school in Baghdad, Iraq. Founded in 1968, the school teaches students between the ages of 6 and 18 and teaches a standard curriculum alongside music and dance classes.

== History ==
The school was founded in Baghdad in 1968, (Note: Some sources cite the founding date as 1969 or 1970.) by Iraqi musicians Aziz Ali, Munir Bashir, and husband and wife Fikri and Agnes Bashir. The school was initially staffed by Russian teachers; the three female and one male teacher came from the Vaganova Academy of Russian Ballet. It was initially opened as part of secularist cultural campaign, beginning with around 200 students and growing rapidly during the oil boom years of the 1970s.

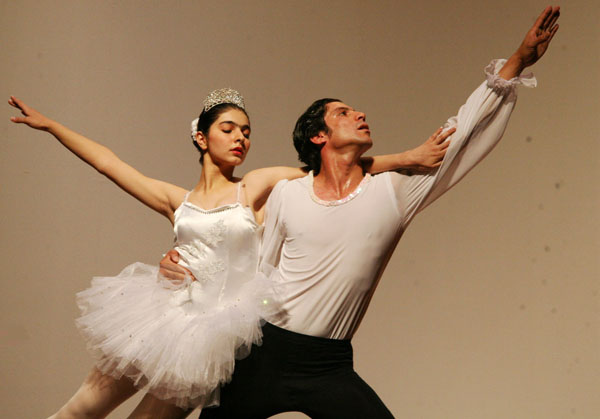
Two ballet dancers performing a ballet show in Iraq in 2007, as part of the National Unity Performing and Visual Arts Academy

In 1977, a school production of The Nutcracker was filmed.

In 1982, the government decreed that the school should be staffed by Iraqi ballet teachers, who were trained in Moscow.

In 1990, due to the Iraqi invasion of Kuwait under President Saddam Hussein, the UN Security Council imposed crippling trade sanctions on Iraq. The school's four Russian teachers, who were from the Bolshoi Ballet, thus returned to Russia.

The school also suffered during the US 2003 invasion of Iraq, when it was hit by a bomb and looted, and after that, little funding was supplied by the Ministry of Culture.

In 2005, the organisation Creative Learning reported on an institution called the "Baghdad Conservatory of Ballet and Music".

In 2014, the school had around 500 students; however, many girls left when they turned 12 or 13, because of parents' objections on religious grounds to the girls being held by boys.

In 2015, US$10,000 was donated to the Ministry of Culture for the school by the British embassy in Baghdad, after the ambassador had attended a school ballet performance; however, the school did not receive any of it.

In March 2016, Associated Press reported that the school was facing financial difficulties owing to the government's budgetary crisis. From 2019, students started having to pay $200 for the six years of primary school education. Fees were deliberately kept low so that poorer children could continue to attend.

== Description ==
=== Governance and structure ===
The school is run by the Ministry of Culture, and is the only ballet school in Iraq. Since 2012 and As of 2018, Ahmed Salem Ghani is director of the school.

=== Location and description ===
The school is located near al-Zawraa Park in Baghdad.

The school teaches students between the ages of 6 and 18 and teaches a standard curriculum alongside music and dance classes. The workload is intense, more so than a standard school.

As of 2018 the school had approximately 586 students. However, most of these students are in elementary and kindergarten classes. Many of the female students are withdrawn at the age of 12 or 13 because their parents object to them dancing with boys on religious grounds. Owing to the growth of some more conservative elements in society, some people consider dancing haram. The Music and Ballet School of Baghdad is the only government-run high school that allows mixed-gender classes.

However, as of 2017 enrolments continued to rise, with around 1,000 applications in 2016. Only 75 entrants were accepted. However, the school lacks funding, and only two out of the four studios are usable. Some of the teachers are volunteers, and outfits are often bought with private funds by those who can afford it.

== Future of students ==
There is little opportunity for ballet students to seek a career in Iraq, and many graduates go abroad. There are more avenues for music students, such as the Iraqi National Symphony Orchestra.

== See also ==
- Baghdad Conservatory (founded 1936)
