= The President's Cake =

2025 drama film

The President’s Cake
- American theatrical release poster
- Arabic: مملكة القصب
- Directed by: Hasan Hadi
- Written by: Hasan Hadi
- Produced by: Leah Chen Baker
- Starring: Baneen Ahmad Nayyef; Sajad Mohamad Qasem; Waheed Thabet Khreibat; Rahim AlHaj
- Cinematography: Tudor Vladimir Panduru
- Edited by: Andu Radu
- Production companies: Maiden Voyage Pictures; Working Barn Productions; Spark Features; Missing Piece Films
- Distributed by: Film Clinic Indie Distribution (Iraq and Qatar); Sony Pictures Classics (United States)
- Release dates: 16 May 2025 (Cannes); 6 February 2026 (United States)
- Running time: 105 minutes
- Countries: Iraq; Qatar; United States
- Language: Mesopotamian Arabic
- Box office: $3 million

The President's Cake (Arabic: مملكة القصب) is a 2025 Arabic-language drama film written and directed by Hasan Hadi. Set in rural Iraq during the Gulf War, it follows the nine-year-old Lamia (Baneen Ahmad Nayyef), who is chosen to bake a cake to celebrate Saddam Hussein's birthday alongside her classmates.

The film had its world premiere at the Directors' Fortnight section of the 2025 Cannes Film Festival on 16 May, where it won the section's Audience Award and the Caméra d'Or. It was selected as the Iraqi entry for Best International Feature Film at the 98th Academy Awards, making the December shortlist. It was released theatrically in the United States by Sony Pictures Classics on 6 February 2026.

== Plot ==
The film is set in rural Iraq under President Saddam Hussein's heavily sanctioned regime, during the Gulf War and the ongoing U.S. aerial bombardments.

Nine-year-old orphan Lamia lives with her grandmother Bibi ("granny" in Iraqi Arabic) and her cockerel Hindi in a peasant village in the Mesopotamian Marshes. At school, lots are drawn to assign students responsibilities, and Lamia is chosen to bake a cake to celebrate the president's birthday. Her neighbor and friend, Saeed, is chosen to bring fresh fruit. Due to international sanctions, commodities are expensive and scarce, but Lamia's teacher threatens to report the students and their families and have them punished if they disobey. Bibi gives her a shopping list of flour, eggs, sugar and baking powder, and the two travel to a nearby city by hitching a ride with a mailman for government officials, Jasim. They bring along items to barter, including Lamia’s father’s watch.

However, Bibi, who is old and diabetic, instead takes Lamia to meet a woman who is to be her foster mother. Lamia takes flight, finding Saeed and his father, who are also in the city. However, they are accused of theft, and Saeed’s father is arrested while he and Lamia get away. Together, they try to source the ingredients for the cake and the fruit through running errands and trying to pawn her father’s watch. They sell the watch, but the money turns out to be forged.

Meanwhile Bibi tries to report Lamia's disappearance, only to be rebuffed by the disinterested and apathetic police. She encounters Jasim again, who joins the search for the little girl. While filing the police report, she collapses from hypoglycemia, and Jasim takes her to the hospital.

After many close scrapes, being robbed, and Hindi being stolen while Saeed was supposed to be watching him, Lamia and Saeed fight. He leaves to find his father, and Lamia goes to find Hindi by herself. At a poultry shop, the butcher "gives" her Hindi and some sugar. Luring her away with the promise of baking soda, he instead takes her to an adult cinema. When she runs, the butcher chases her and calls her a thief, and she is arrested.

Jasim asks after her at the police station again, coincidentally finds her, and has her released. They return to the hospital, only to find that Bibi has died. They drive back to the village along with Bibi's body for burial. That night, Saeed's mother helps Lamia bake the cake with the remaining ingredients, but she refuses her offer to sleep over.

The next day, the school celebrates the president's birthday, but a mourning Lamia refuses to partake. Inside the classroom, Lamia's teacher tastes the cake and expresses approval, but is interrupted by air raid sirens. Taking shelter from bombs exploding outside, Lamia and Saeed, both crying and afraid, have a staring contest to block out the carnage. The screen cuts to black.

The film ends with archival footage of Saddam Hussein's televised birthday celebration, with an Arabic cover of "Happy Birthday to You" playing.

== Cast ==
- Baneen Ahmad Nayyef as Lamia
- Sajad Mohamad Qasem as Saeed
- Waheed Thabet Khreibat as Bibi
- Rahim AlHaj as Jasim
- Maytham Mreidi as Saeed's father
- Ahmad Hameed Ahmad as Watch Seller
- Aqeel Al-Shamri as Flour Worker
- Tayseer Ibrahim Radi as Butcher
- Nadia Rashak as Saeed's mother

Mohammed Ammar, Mohammed Zaid, Al-Hassan Adnan and Ahmed Al-Hayali have a minor appearance in the film as musicians playing in a café, with Elaf Mohamed as the vocalist.

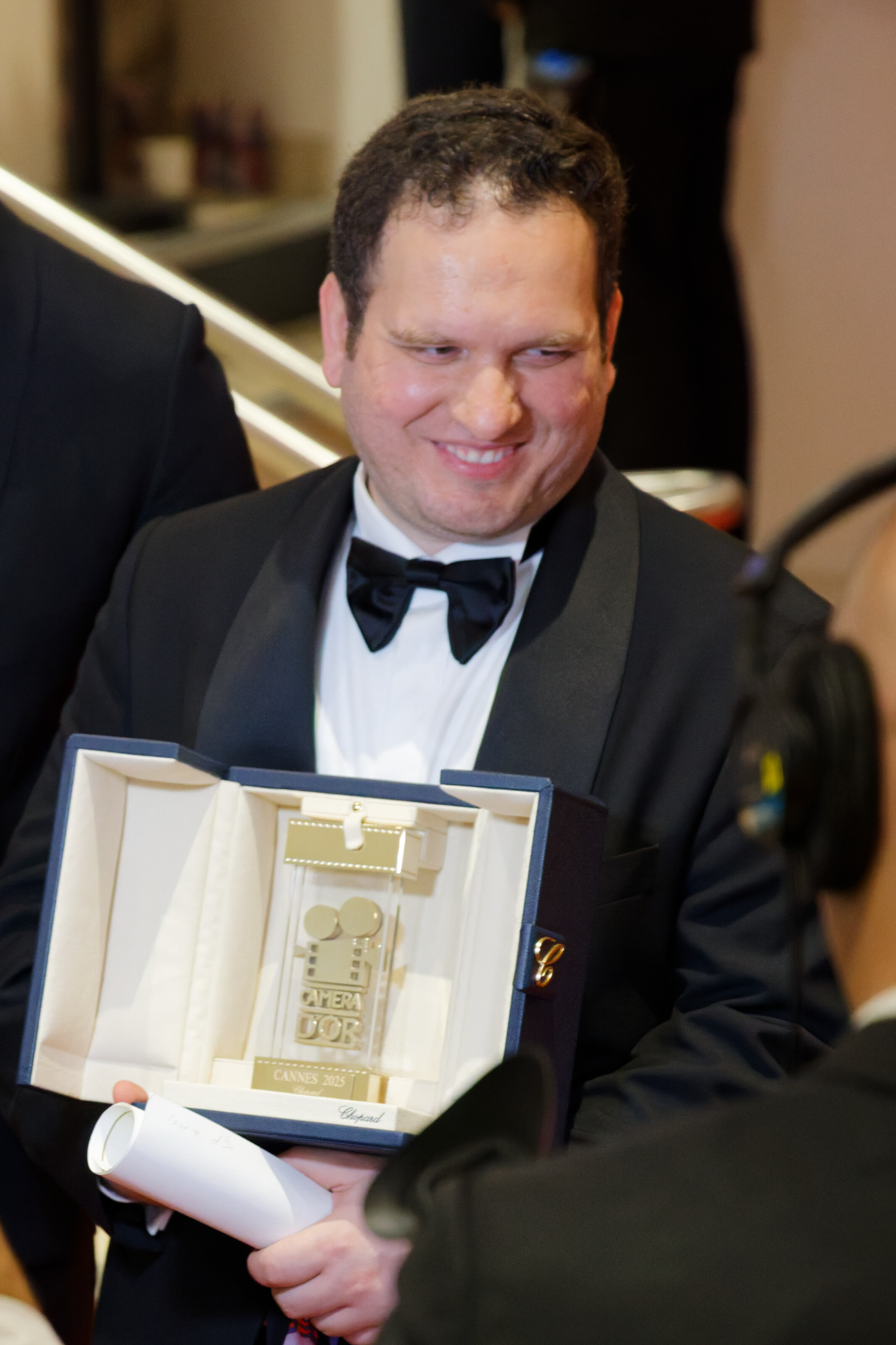
Hadi after the 2025 Cannes Film Festival closing ceremony

== Production ==
The film is the feature directorial debut of Hasan Hadi, who co-wrote the script with Eric Roth. It was filmed entirely in Iraq, using ⁷mostly untrained actors.

The film received support and grants from the Doha Film Institute, and SFFILM Ranin Grant. It was also selected for the 2022 Sundance Institute Directing and Screenwriting Labs. Marielle Heller, Eric Roth, and Chris Columbus are among the executive producers.

== Release ==
The film had its world premiere at the 2025 Cannes Film Festival in the Directors' Fortnight section, on May 16, 2025. It became the first film from Iraq to compete in the Directors' Fortnight, and won the top prize in the section, the only Cannes Film Festival award voted for by attending audience members.

On May 27, 2025, Sony Pictures Classics acquired distribution rights to the film in North and Latin America, Eastern Europe, India, and Southeast Asia.

The film was screened at Sydney Film Festival in June 2025, Melbourne International Film Festival in August 2025, CineFest Miskolc International Film Festival (Hungary) and Calgary International Film Festival in September 2025, Adelaide Film Festival in October 2025 and Sarlat Film Festival in November 2025.

It competed for IFFI ICFT UNESCO Gandhi Medal at the 56th International Film Festival of India in November 2025.

In November 2025, Sony announced that the film would be given a week-long awards-qualifying run in New York and Los Angeles starting December 12, 2025, followed by a limited theatrical release on February 6, 2026 that will expand nationwide two weeks later on February 27.

The film had a theatrical release in the US on February 11, 2026; in the UK on February 13; and in Australia on April 2.

== Reception ==
On the review aggregator website Rotten Tomatoes, 99% of 81 critics' reviews are positive, with an average rating of 8/10. The website's consensus reads: "A tenderly crafted, often devastating portrait of childhood in rural Iraq, The President's Cake vividly brings to life its morally complex world through richly drawn characters and intimate storytelling." On Metacritic, which uses a weighted average, the film holds a score of 84/100 based on 17 critics, indicating "universal acclaim".

Sheri Linden of The Hollywood Reporter called the film a "tragicomic gem", praising the performances, Hadi's direction ("Hadi stages the action here and throughout the movie with fluent energy"), and the cinematography of Tudor Vladimir Panduru.

Diane Carson, writing for the Alliance of Women Film Journalists, called Baneen Ahmed Nayyef's performance as Lamia "a treasure of expressive joy and heartbreaking sadness, of frustration and determination", while Waheed Thabet Khreibat, as Bibi, gives "a subdued, wonderful performance" and Sajad Mohamad Qasem as Saeed "brings energy and impetuous trouble to the quest", concluding with "The President's Cake offers an astute, poignant story of empathy for humanity caught in the crosshairs".

Nabil Salih, a writer and photographer from Baghdad, writing for Jacobin, is less complimentary. He writes that the film is "both entertaining and compelling, but only if you know little about Iraq... the film rehearses known stereotypes and corresponds to little that is real. Instead, it fulfills misconceptions of morbid Oriental cities reduced by despotic regimes to decadent theaters for the corrupt".

British film critic Peter Bradshaw, writing for The Guardian, gave the film 4 out of 5 stars, praising the performances and direction.

== Accolades ==
| Award | Date of ceremony | Category | Recipient(s) | Result | Ref. |
|---|---|---|---|---|---|
| Cannes Film Festival | 24 May 2025 | Directors' Fortnight Audience Award | Hasan Hadi | Won | |
| Cannes Film Festival | 24 May 2025 | Camera d'Or | Hasan Hadi | Won | |
| Miskolc International Film Festival | 13 September 2025 | Emeric Pressburger Prize | The President's Cake | Nominated | |
| Miskolc International Film Festival | 13 September 2025 | CICAE Jury Award | The President's Cake | Won | |
| Miskolc International Film Festival | 13 September 2025 | FIPRESCI Jury Award for Best International Film | The President's Cake | Won | |
| Miskolc International Film Festival | 13 September 2025 | International Ecumenical Jury Award | The President's Cake | Won | |
| Hamptons International Film Festival | 13 October 2025 | Best Narrative Feature | The President's Cake | Won | |
| Stockholm International Film Festival | 16 November 2025 | Best Debut | The President's Cake | Won | |
| Asia Pacific Screen Awards | 27 November 2025 | Best Youth Film | Hasan Hadi and Leah Chen Baker | Nominated | |

== See also ==
- List of submissions to the 98th Academy Awards for Best International Feature Film
- List of Iraqi submissions for the Academy Award for Best International Feature Film
