= Aida Nadeem =

Iraqi musician

Aida Nadeem عايدا نديم
- Origin: Baghdad, Iraq
- Genres: cross over - world music
- Occupation(s): musician, composer, performer
- Website: www.aidanadeem.net

Aida Nadeem (Arabic: عايدا نديم; born 1965 in Baghdad, Iraq) is an Iraqi musician living in Denmark.

== Early career ==
As a child, Aida, began to sing, dance and write poetry. With interest in classical music, at the age of twelve, she began her studies at the prestigious Music and Ballet school Baghdad. Her main instrument was the bassoon.

Her primary sources of inspiration were composers like Karlheinz Stockhausen and Arthur Honegger. In 1986, she gained employment with Iraq's symphony orchestra.

Nadeem moved to Denmark in 1991, where she continued her studies at the Royal Danish Academy of Music. She distinguished herself in Denmark as one of the very few prominent foreign artists to make a breakthrough on the scene and to make a wide impact from her debut release Arabian Underground.

In the United Kingdom, she has appeared at Glastonbury, WOMAD and the Cambridge Folk Festival, along with her collaborators The Angel Brothers and Aki Nawaz.

== Discography ==
=== Albums ===
- Arabian Underground (1998)
- Arabtronica (2002)
- Out of Bagdad! (2005)
- Beyond Destruction (2010)
