= Zeena Zaki =

Iraqi haute couture fashion designer (born 1974)

- Born: Copenhagen, Denmark
- Label: Julea Domani
- Awards: 2009 Best Female Designer for Prêt a Porter Award

Zeena Zaki (born 1/1/1974) is an Iraqi haute couture fashion designer. She launched her first fashion atelier in Dubai, the United Arab Emirates in 2003, where her fashion house operates under the label "Julea Domani", an epitome of both Edwardian and Victorian fashion eras which prove popular amongst the UAE's fashionista's.

== Personal life ==
Born in Copenhagen, Denmark, to Iraqi parents, Zeena and her family moved after two years to travel to Romania then to Kuwait, Iraq and then the Emirates. Zaki came from an artistic background. Her father, an interior designer who designed two of his own restaurants in Dubai and Los Angeles, and her mother was involved in the fashion industry as a designer and so Zaki learnt from her and did not attend university or college to study fashion.

She cites Elie Saab and Valentino as her favourite designers.

== Career ==
Zaki launched her first collection at the Dubai World Trade Center in 2006. After viewing her designs at the world trade center, the international fashion expert, Michael Mandeville commented, "I wonder no more, it is enough to know that Zeena is the daughter of the oldest civilization in the history of mankind, Mesopotamia, Iraq, rising up at this time from beneath the ashes of this cradle of civilization. We can now see Iraq starting to shine again."

Since 2007, Zaki has participated in The Bride Show Dubai and in 2009 was awarded Best Female Designer for Prêt-à-Porter at Dubai Fashion Week.

Having opened a showroom boutique in Palm Strip Shopping Mall, Jumeirah, Julea Domani's popularity furthers in growth. She held her 2010 collection at Dubai Fashion Week.

In 2015, Zaki branched into the United States where her dresses have been worn numerous Hollywood celebrities on the red carpet.
