= Iraqi National Symphony Orchestra =

The Iraqi National Symphony Orchestra (INSO) began as the Baghdad Symphony Orchestra in 1944. This was the first symphony orchestra in Iraq and was created and directed by Albert Chaffoo. It performed for approximately two years and was disbanded after Albert Chaffoo, its conductor and founder, left Iraq and returned to London to continue his musical career. Many members of the former Baghdad Symphony later formed the future Iraqi National Symphony. The orchestra became officially known as the Iraqi National Symphony in 1959 when its members began to receive a salary from the government. The INSO was abolished by the Iraqi Minister of Culture in 1962 and rehearsed underground until 1970, when it was re-established.

Over the next ten years, the Orchestra toured France, Spain, Algeria, Lebanon and Jordan, and hosted guest musicians and conductors from many countries. But during the 1980s and 1990s many musicians, plagued by financial hardship, left the country to pursue opportunities elsewhere. Although its home theater was burned by looters during the April 2003 invasion of Baghdad, the orchestra performed a concert in Baghdad in June 2003 and subsequently traveled through northern Iraq, recruiting new members.

In December 2003, the orchestra performed a joint concert with the U.S. National Symphony Orchestra and Yo-Yo Ma at the Kennedy Center in Washington, co-sponsored by the U.S. State Department. President George W. Bush and First lady Laura Bush attended the concert, and Colin Powell introduced the orchestra.

The INSO is currently managed and conducted by Karim Wasfi.

== Members ==
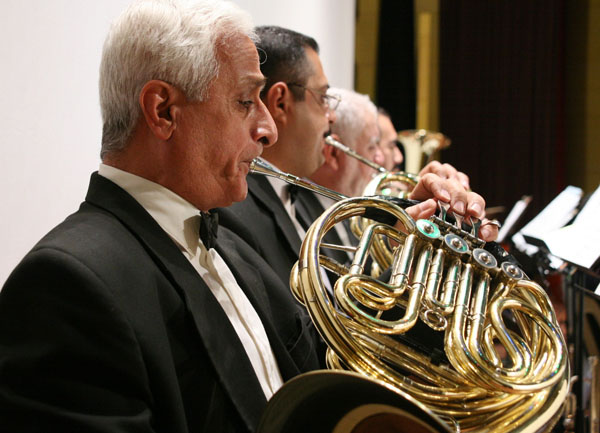
French horn players at a concert of the orchestra in 2007

The orchestra includes 90+ musicians from different religious and ethnic backgrounds like Shi'a, Sunni, Kurds, Turkoman, Armenians and Christians, as well as six women, one of whom is the first American woman to join in the history of the orchestra.

=== Famous attendees ===
- Aida Nadeem
