= Mustafa Hassan =

Iraqi-Danish footballer (born 1990)

Personal information
- Full name: Mustafa Ahmed Hassan
- Date of birth: 10 February 1990 (age 36)
- Place of birth: Najaf, Iraq
- Position: Striker

Team information
- Current team: Gjelleråsen

Youth career
- 2003–2006: FC Bornholm
- 2006–2010: Brøndby IF

Senior career*
Years	Team	Apps	(Gls)
2008–2010	Brøndby IF	2	(0)
2010–2011	HB Køge	12	(3)
2011	Kristianstads FF	0	(0)
2011–2012	Svebølle B&I	7	(5)
2012	Næstved Boldklub	11	(3)
2012	Svebølle B&I	0	(0)
2012–2013	Hobro IK	11	(2)
2013–2014	Svebølle B&I		
2014–2014	HamKam	14	(3)
2015–2019	Skeid	76	(9)
2020–	Gjelleråsen	0	(0)
- * Club domestic league appearances and goals as of 11 July 2020 ‡ National team caps and goals as of 18 September 2014

Mustafa Ahmad Hassan (Arabic: مصطفى احمد حسن; born 10 February 1990) is an Iraqi-Danish professional footballer who currently plays for Gjelleråsen.

== Early life ==
Hassan came to Denmark from Iraq at the age of thirteen, settling in Bornholm. He obtained a Danish passport in December 2008.

== Career ==
After his arrival in 2003 in Denmark, he joined the Danish football team FC Bornholm where he stayed for 3 years. He then moved to Brøndby IF in the summer 2006. He played his first professional game on 30 October 2008 in the Danish Cup against Holstebro BK, and his first league game in the Danish Superliga was on 5 October 2008 against Odense BK.

On 31 August 2010, he signed with Danish club HB Køge. On 23 February 2011 left his club HB Køge and signed with his former Brøndby IF teammate Philip Pedersen for Swedish club Kristianstads FF. His contract with the Swedish club was terminated on 19 May 2011. He didn't play a single match for the club.

On 8 September 2011 he signed a contract with Svebølle B&I in the Danish 2nd Divisions.

On 4 February 2012 he signed a contract with Næstved Boldklub. He played 11 games at Næstved, but at the end of the season the club was relegated, and Hassan returned to his former club Svebølle B&I. A month after joining Svebølle Hassan was offered a contract at Hobro IK, where he would be reunited with his former manager from Næstved, Klavs Rasmussen.

Rasmussen resigned as manager of Hobro in January 2013, and two months later Hassan decided to move back to Svebølle B&I for a third spell at the club.
