= Balai of Qenneshrin =

5th-century Syrian Christian saint

Balai of Qenneshrin (Syriac: ܒܠܝ ܕܩܢܫܪܝܢ) was a Syriac poet who lived in Qenneshrin (Chalcis) in the early fifth century. He wrote five madroshe on Bishop Acacius of Beroea (died 436) and a madrosho on a church dedication in Qenneshrin. He may also have written twelve memre on Joseph, but these are also attributed to Ephrem and scholarship remains divided.

Very little is known about his early life. It has been suggested that he might have been a native of Edessa who later moved to Qinnasrin after being ordained a monk.

A collection of sermons is attributed to him as well.
