= Tariq Hashim =

Iraqi filmmaker

T.H is an Iraqi filmmaker who was born in Baghdad. He studied theatre and film in Baghdad, and Bulgaria and he returns to an Iraq, full-fledged into war, after 23 years of exile. He tapes 16 hours of film leading to the movie 16 hours in Baghdad (2004). The film reveals the multi layered social landscape of Baghdad today. The film won the Golden Hawk Award at the 4th Arab Film Festival in Rotterdam, 2004.

His film "www.gilgamesh.21" (0) won the Silver Hawk Award at the 7th Arab Film Festival in Rotterdam, . It is about two men communicating through webcams between Cp and Baghdad, trying to virtually rehearse for a Gilgamesh play while sharing their own unhappiness, one at being stranded inside his crumbling country, the other at being stranded outside of it.

In addition to film making, his talent expands to theatre, painting, photography & music.

Tariq Hashim is based in this world.
