= Anja Al-Erhayem =

Danish filmmaker

Anja Al-Erhayem (Arabic: أنيا الإرحيم; born 1971 in Denmark) is a Danish filmmaker born to an Iraqi father and Danish mother.

Before the US-led invasion of Iraq, in 2002, Anja travelled to Iraq with her father to make a film about his family. The film titled Back to Baghdad, showed footage of everyday life in Iraq under Saddam Hussein. The film itself has won a number of international prizes. After the war started, Anja went back to make a follow-up to her first film.

== Filmography ==
- Back to Baghdad (2003)
- Wide Angle - A Woman Among Warlords (2007)
