= Jamil Bashir =

Iraqi musician (1921–1977)

Jamil Bashir (Arabic: جميل بشير; 1921 – September 24, 1977), also spelt Bachir, was an Iraqi musician and expert oud player.

== Early life and education ==
Jamil Bashir was born in Mosul, Iraq, in 1921, to an ethnic Assyrian Christian family. His father was a singer and a well-known oud player who started to teach him the oud when he was around six years old, and he was the brother of oud player Munir Bashir.

Bashir was enrolled at the Iraqi Music Institute, also known as Baghdad Conservatory, when it opened in 1936, to learn oud with Sherif Muheddin Haydar and violin with Sando Albu. He graduated with honours degrees in oud in 1943 and violin in 1946.

== Career ==
Bashir worked at the Institute as an oud and violin teacher, along with his brother Munir. Among others, he taught Rahim AlHaj.

He headed first the Baghdad Radio Orchestra, and later the Baghdad Radio Music Department.

Bashir wrote a two-volume oud method, and was also a good singer.

== Death ==
Bashir died in London on 24 September 1977.
