= Munir Bashir =

Munir Bashir منير بشير ܡܘܢܝܪ ܒܫܝܪ
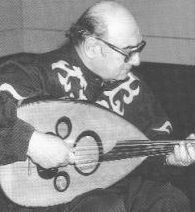

Background information
- Born: 1930
- Origin: Mosul, Iraq
- Died: September 1997 (aged 66–67) Budapest, Hungary
- Genre: Middle Eastern music
- Occupation: Musician
- Instruments: lute, oud
- Years active: 1953–97

Munir Bashir (Arabic: منير بشير; Syriac: ܡܘܢܝܪ ܒܫܝܪ; 1930 – September 28, 1997) was an Iraqi-Assyrian oudist. Bashir is considered one of the foremost virtuosos of the Arabic oud, and is widely renowned as one of the most important figures in 20th century Middle Eastern music.

Bashir is widely regarded both for his extensive mastery of the Arabic modal system of maqam and his virtuosity in the improvisational tradition of Arabic taqsim. He is credited as being the first major figure to elevate the Arabic oud to the realm of solo concert performance, and was among the first Middle Eastern instrumentalists to gain recognition in the United States and Europe. His music is characterized by a unique style of improvisation that sometimes saw his native traditional Arabic music fused with Indian and European musical influences. Bashir also pioneered many techniques on the oud which have since become standard practice.

Bashir is the father of oudist Omar Bashir, who later received acclaim as a master oudist in his own right, and with whom he recorded several albums. He is also the brother of oudist Jamil Bashir. Although Bashir was born in Iraq, the tumultuous political landscape of violent coups and wars during his lifetime eventually led to his seeking refuge in Europe. He first gained prominence in Hungary, where he would maintain a permanent residence throughout most of his adult years.

== Life ==
=== Early life ===
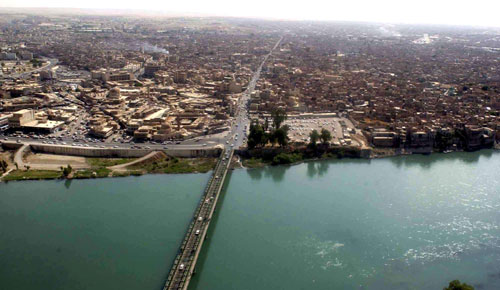
Mosul with its Tigris bridge

Munir Bashir was born in Mosul, in northern Iraq, to an Assyrian Christian family. His exact birth year is debated, with sources suggesting a range from 1928 to 1930.

His father, Abd al-Aziz, and his brother, Jamil, were well-regarded oud soloists and vocalists; Jamil also authored an important textbook on the oud. The family began educating young Bashir in music at the age of five, with his father teaching him and Jamil the basics of the oud. Abd al-Aziz, who was also a poet, believed that the pure and historic tradition of Arab music had declined in Baghdad, which he wanted to preserve.

Bashir initially learned to play the violoncello, a European instrument that had become popular as a bass instrument in Arabic music towards the end of the 19th century. Simultaneously, he was taught to play the oud. In Arabic music, the oud holds a similar role to the piano in European music, being the instrument used to impart essential theoretical aspects of music.

Northern Iraq has a rich musical history due to the blend of various styles and traditions. In this milieu, Bashir encountered Byzantine, Kurdish, Assyrian, Turkish, Persian, and traditional Abbasid music.

=== Moving to Baghdad ===
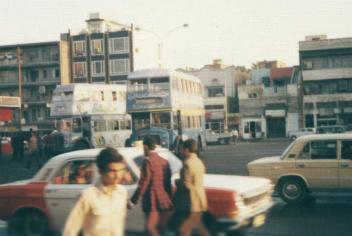
Baghdad in the 1970s

At the age of six, Bashir was sent to the Baghdad Conservatory, which was founded in 1936 by Hanna Petros.

Bashir was intensely focused during his studies, and especially after earning his degree, on documenting and preserving the traditional musical styles of his country. These styles had been increasingly overshadowed by "Western" influences, particularly commercial ones, due to Iraq's turbulent history and other factors.

In 1951, Bashir accepted a teaching position at the newly founded Académie des Beaux-Arts in Baghdad. In addition to his teaching duties, he worked as an editor for Iraqi broadcasting.

=== Exploring outside of Iraq ===
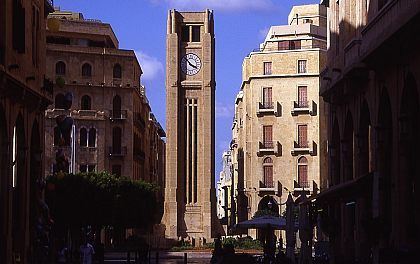
Beirut, Place de l'Étoile

Iraq experienced intense political instability during most of Bashir's lifetime, leading Bashir to have an ambivalent relationship with his homeland. The 1950s and 1960s, in particular, marked the final years of the Hashemite monarchy, leading to the fall of Faisal II and a series of military coups shortly thereafter. Thus, although Bashir felt deeply rooted in the rich cultural heritage of Mesopotamia, this event ultimately forced him to leave Iraq and work abroad in 1958.

Bashir traveled first to Beirut. His reputation had preceded him by the time he'd arrived; he was promptly hired as an accompanist and "star soloist" for the legendary Lebanese singer Fairuz in 1953. During this time, he became acquainted with American and Latin American popular music, and started to become interested in fusing these styles with traditional Arabic music. He became intensely interested in musicology, which would eventually earn him teaching positions at conservatories in both Beirut and Baghdad.

The years 1953 and 1954 were pivotal in Bashir’s development as a virtuoso instrumentalist. His first concert as a soloist was held in Istanbul in 1953. The following year, at age 24, Bashir was first featured on Iraqi television. By 1957, he had embarked on several tours across most European countries. However, the difficult political situation in his country, and the resulting challenges it posed for working musicians, ultimately forced him to leave Iraq permanently.

=== Budapest ===
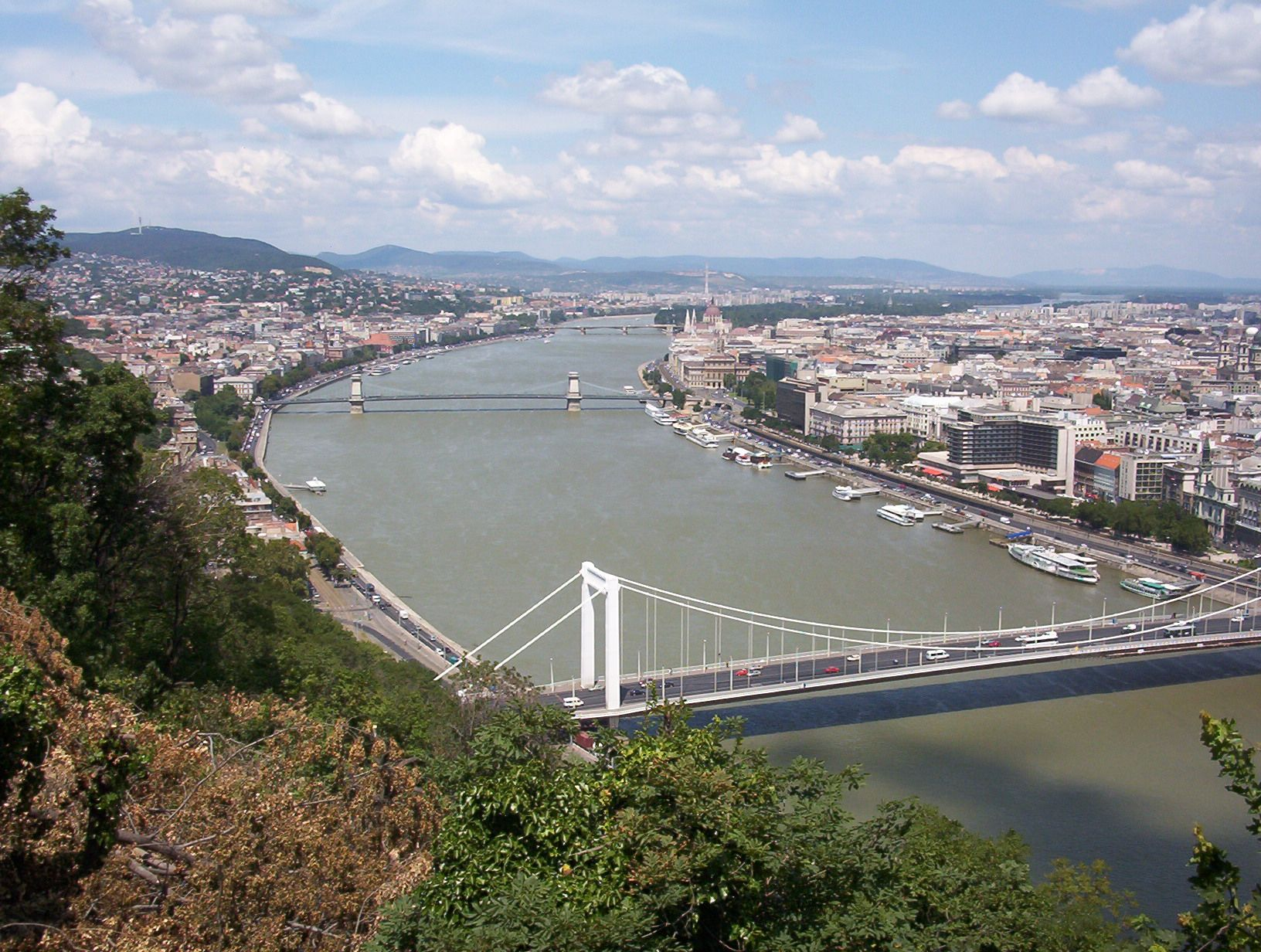
Budapest seen from the Gellért Hill

In the early 1960s, following a brief stay in Beirut, Bashir settled in Budapest, which he would call home for the rest of his life. He married a Hungarian woman, and in 1970, their son Omar was born in the Hungarian capital. Omar would later follow in his father's footsteps, recording many duets with his father and becoming a renowned oudist in his own right.

Bashir was particularly attracted to Budapest not only for its status as a European musical metropolis, but also for the opportunity to study at the renowned Franz Liszt Conservatory under the supervision of Zoltán Kodály. Kodály was famous for his collaboration with Béla Bartók in preserving traditional Hungarian folk songs, and shared Bashir's commitment to safeguarding indigenous musical heritage. Bashir studied at the conservatory and completed his doctorate in musicology in 1965.

Following Kodály's passing in 1967, Bashir briefly returned to Beirut. However, he found himself disillusioned by the evolution of Arabian music, which he perceived as deteriorating and becoming increasingly commercialized due to the mishandling of Western influences. Dismayed by these trends, which he attributed to popular singers, Bashir declined to accept engagements from them.

=== Ambassador of Iraqi music ===
In 1973, the Iraqi Ministry of Information appointed Bashir to its culture committee. This was at a transitional time in Iraqi history, as the regime of the Ba'ath party was not yet firmly established. The party saw Bashir as a unifying cultural figure who could appeal to and integrate the Christian minority. Bashir presented himself as apolitical, and owing to his international popularity, he was deemed a suitable representative for the diverse ethnic, religious, and political groups of Iraq. Bashir enjoyed this position even throughout the shifting political landscape: for instance, in 1981, even when Saddam Hussein was in power and the influence was shifting towards the Sunnis, the government still supported the establishment of Bashir's Iraqi Traditional Music Group, which was dedicated to showcasing the diversity of Iraqi culture.

During the 1980s, he taught at the Baghdad Conservatory, with one of his students being renowned oud player and composer Rahim AlHaj.

In 1987, during the Iran–Iraq War, Bashir realized a lifelong dream: he organized the inaugural Babylon International Festival of dance, music, and theatre. which he led for several years.

However, Bashir rarely spent time in Baghdad and ultimately left Iraq after the First Gulf War in 1991. His guest performances, primarily in Europe, provided a broad and receptive audience, thereby offering an excellent platform for showcasing his highly original and mature style of improvisation and composition. Most of his recordings were also made in Europe.

In his final years, he focused on establishing his son Omar as his musical successor. The two made several duo recordings together, including the particularly acclaimed *Duo de 'ûd* album with Omar in February 1994, which is considered a classic of Bashir’s oeuvre due to its exemplary blend of traditional folk material with extensive improvisation. Omar later became established as a virtuoso oudist in his own right.

Munir Bashir died from heart failure in 1997 in Budapest at the age of 68, shortly before his scheduled departure for a tour in Mexico.

== Instrumental style ==
=== General characteristics ===
Bashir is universally regarded as one of the most important oudists of the 20th century, as well as in the general history of the instrument. Bashir pioneered a distinctive sound on the oud, diverging sharply from the urban "showmanship" seen in the typical "Egyptian" style of Farid Al-Atrash, as well as the heavily jazz-influenced music of Lebanese artist Rabih Abou-Khalil, who enjoyed considerable popularity in Europe. Bashir instead pursued a more emotionally intimate style, which would eventually become his signature sound.

Bashir was particularly renowned for his mastery of solo improvisation (taqsīm) over the traditional modes (maqāmat) of Arabic music. His peers regarded him as an unparalleled virtuoso in this domain. Bashir was the first person to perform solo concerts featuring only the oud, which had previously been relegated to the realm of background accompaniment. Bashir's pioneering role in this regard elevated the status of the oud to being one of the primary lead instruments of Middle Eastern music, and paved the way for many contemporary oudists to follow.

Throughout his musical journey, Bashir consistently challenged the stereotype that the oud was merely the Arabic version of the western "campfire guitar". His efforts elevated the instrument's status and expanded its musical possibilities.

=== Tunings ===
In many musical traditions, stringed instruments often employ various tunings to suit specific pieces. Bashir, following this practice, experimented extensively with different tunings. The standard tuning for the Arabic oud – distinct from its Turkish counterpart, which has a slightly different history – is typically:

audio sample

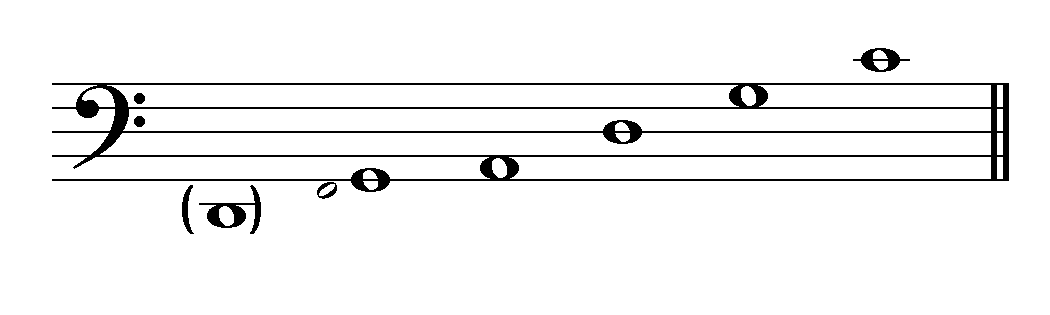

Building on older traditions of the Iraqi oud school, including that of his elder brother, Munir Bashir developed a signature tuning that bears his name:

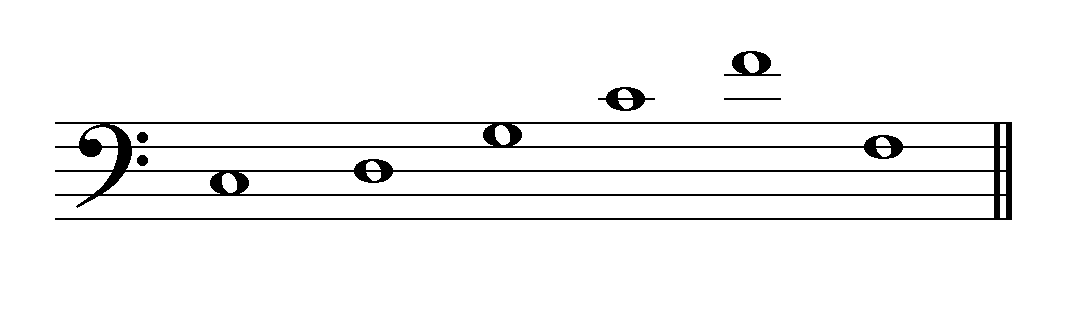

A notable feature of this tuning is the duplication of the highest course in F with an additional course tuned an octave lower. This innovation creates a rich, full sound in the high melody course, aligning with Bashir's focus on melodic forms.

The Bashir school further developed another tuning variation that incorporates an F-course on the bass strings, which tuned an octave lower than in the previous example. Optionally, two F-strings can be added, tuned an octave apart. This arrangement frames the melody course in the fingerboard's center with bass courses, resulting in a remarkably full sound and enabling unique melodies. However, this complex tuning system demands exceptional picking technique from the musician.

=== Picking technique ===
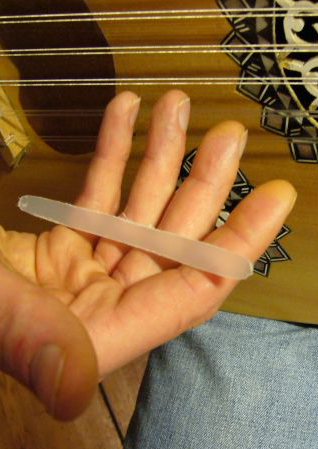
A risha

Like other lute-family instruments (such as the mandolin and sitar), the oud is played by plucking the strings with a plectrum (pick). In Arabic, this pick is called a risha, which historically was crafted from the pin feather of an eagle. Bashir was particularly known for having meticulous picking technique with the risha, emphasizing a clean and nimble technique, in contrast to the "heavier" approach favored by many other oud players at the time.

Bashir was particularly known for his ability to perform rapid, asymmetrically accented melodies on the instrument in a precise and fluid manner. Such melodies and complex rhythms are commonplace within traditional Arabic music, which places greater emphasis on such complex rhythmic patterns than European music. However, prior to Bashir, such virtuosity was rarely seen on the oud, due in part to the limitations of traditional technique: the location of the risha in the palm and the doubled strings can lead to considerable difficulty in playing such parts cleanly on the instrument. Bashir's innovative technique made it possible to play these kinds of lines on the oud, to the extent that such ability today is often seen as a hallmark of virtuosity in modern oud playing. Bashir's exceptional picking skills are especially evident in his ability to perform these techniques in fast, complex meters like 10/8 metre with seemingly effortless virtuosity, hiding the significant challenges in this method.

The ability to play such melodic lines on the instrument is Bashir's approach to foreign musical forms is also reflected in his experimentation with alternative picking techniques. He incorporated fingerpicking, a technique cultivated in guitar playing – especially in flamenco – as a key element of his mature style. However, after brief experimentation, he abandoned the use of a thumb-plectrum (mezrab), a technique he encountered during his studies of the Indian sitar.

=== Improvisation ===
Bashir's improvisations were steeped in the Arabic tradition of taqsim, or musical improvisation within the Arabic maqam modal system. In taqsim, the musician creatively brings out the sound of one or mote maqams by playing a sequence of structured melodic lines that bring out the important sub-chords or "ajnas" of the maqam and establish its unique characteristic sound. The taqsim typically follows certain thematic guidelines of development, within which the musician is free to explore or sometimes depart if they so wish. One may draw a comparison to traditional jazz improvisation, which also takes place within the guidelines of traditional jazz standards, song forms, and so on. The criteria of taqsim are different from other musical traditions, but just as artful.

Bashir was known for having a certain "vocabulary" of melodic phrases he would tend to play, sometimes referred to as bashirisms. Part of the art of taqsim also involves embellishment of traditional melodies or familiar melodic fragments, also commonplace in jazz improvisation and referred to as quoting. Within this tradition, these "bashirisms" have become commonplace and recognizable to Arabic musicians, and are sometimes quoted, in the same way that Western jazz musicians are easily able to recognize and quote melodic ideas characteristic of Charlie Parker or Louis Armstrong.

=== Extended Playing Techniques ===
The oud belongs to the family of short-scale lutes. The widest interval that can be played between the open string and the end of the oud fingerboard is a fifth (quint), although it is possible to play higher intervals on the same string by playing harmonics or flageolets on the open strings. Bashir introduced the use of harmonics into oud technique, which later become standard practice on the instrument.

Although the use of harmonics is fairly common in string instruments, it was not in common use as a standard part of oud technique. While Bashir did not invent this slightly unorthodox technique, he was known for integrating it into his style exceptionally well, expanding the expressive range of the oud.

=== Foreign Influences ===
Bashir, despite being a fierce advocate for the preservation of traditional Arabic music, was also highly interested in incorporating ideas from other musical traditions of the world into his own compositions. Bashir was known for having a comprehensive knowledge of ethnomusicology, with a particular emphasis on (Northern Indian music), European music, and particularly Spanish Flamenco music, elements of which he sought to include in his own music. Bashir sought above all else to avoid merging these styles in a superficial or disjointed way, eschewing simple "quotations" of foreign melodies in favor of a deeper approach that would fuse the tonalities involved in a natural and coherent way.

A noted example of Bashir's innovative approach to musical fusion is his composition Al-Amira al-Andaluciyya ("The Princess of Andalusia"), which can be heard on a duo recording with his son Omar. The piece opens with a motif that would be highly unusual in traditional Arabic music:

audio sample

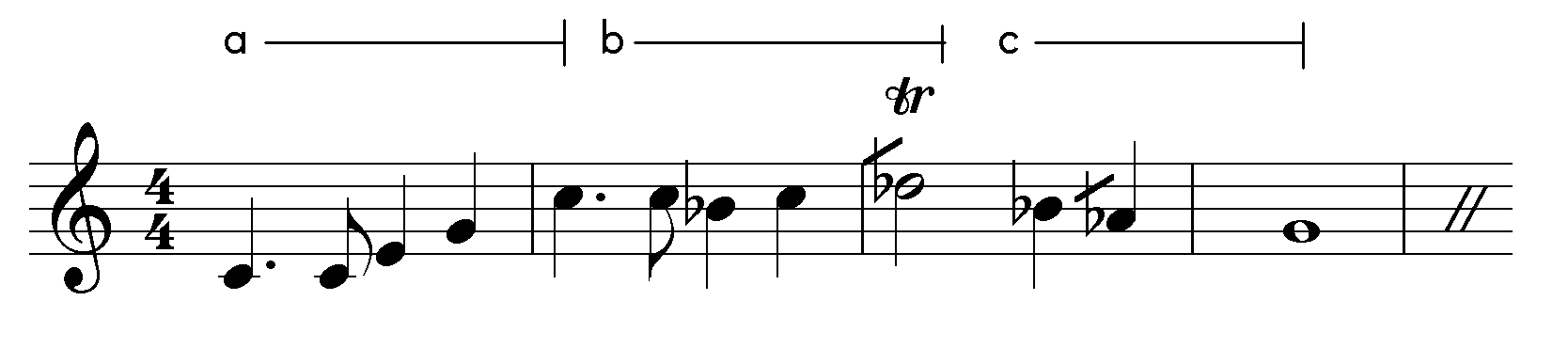

The opening C-major arpeggio (motif a) would be unremarkable in European music, but on the oud it represents an extraordinary musical gesture, as such major triads are not typically used in Arabic music. The subsequent play around the note C (motif b) alludes to the musical connotation of Andalusia (for centuries a province of the caliphate and the birthplace of flamenco) that Bashir intended.

With just two notes (D♭ and B♭), the major triad transforms into the Phrygian mode, which is fairly characteristic within Spanish flamenco music. The tremolo-like ornamentation of the leading D♭ further enhances this effect. The descending line to G (motif c) then establishes the key for the following improvisation, which is set in a traditional Arabic maqam called Hijaz Kar Kurd. This maqam has the following (simplified) structure:

audio sample

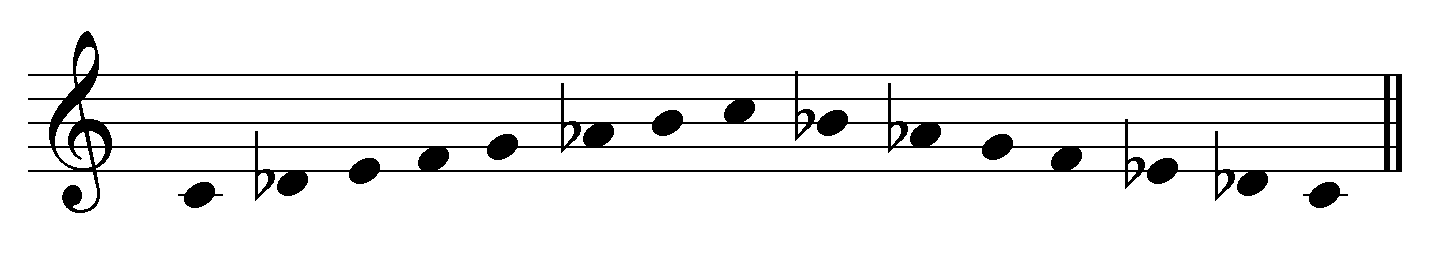

The highly asymmetric structure of this scale is less common in European music - but familiar to Arabic music, where it necessitates a approach to building ascending and descending melody lines. It's well-suited for flamenco-like improvisations, as the flamenco style is characterized by an ambivalent and unstable relationship to major/minor tonality - which, in turn, is foreign idea to Arabic music, which doesn't have triadic harmony. Bashir's dovetailing of these two styles is characteristic of his compositions around this time.

As the improvisation progresses, Bashir further fuses the styles by playing numerous chords, or "rasgueados". These are an indispensable stylistic element of flamenco guitar - but very rare on oud, which is fretless and thus challenging to play with the correct intonation - limitations which Bashir again sought to surpass in his fusion of the two styles.

== Influences and Reception ==
=== Relevance to Arabic Music ===
Munir Bashir emerged on the scene at a particularly difficult time in the history of Arabic music. Due to his professional experiences, he was more aware of these difficulties than many of his colleagues, who often tended to accept their working conditions with resignation. British historian Bernard Lewis refers to Bashir as an example of a Middle Eastern musician who understood how to engage with Western culture on the basis of equal collaboration. Bashir sought and found new possibilities of musical expression by upholding the traditions of Arabic music and by exploring older forms.

On a more technical level, Bashir contextualized his improvisations within maqamat, some of which were never used outside of Iraq or had fallen into obscurity during the 20th century.

=== Criticism ===
Bashir's integration of foreign stylistic elements led to misunderstandings and criticism from traditionalists. Music journalist Sami Asmar reported that Bashir was accused of pandering to his Western audience by preferentially using simpler maqamat. Specifically, it was claimed that Bashir misused maqam Rast and Shadd Araban in this way.

Maqam Rast audio sample

Maqam Shadd Araban audio sample

It is true that maqam Rast is a fundamental scale in Arabic music, perhaps taking a similar role to the major scale in Western music. However, the intonation of Rast is very unfamiliar to Western listeners, being essentially the major scale with the E and B notes flattened by a quarter tone - or the Dorian mode with the Eb and Bb raised by a quarter tone. This scale, and the use of these quarter-tone alterations in particular, make this scale sound highly unusual to Western ears. A similar situation holds for Shadd Araban, which features the use of two augmented second intervals, which is also very rare within Western music.

Thus, many feel these criticisms are not well-founded and unsupported by Bashir's recordings or live performances, which do not show much preference for the two aforementioned scales. Instead, Bashir often preferred scales that allowed for significant melodic freedom and tonal ambivalence, which can be challenging for European ears accustomed to harmony—such as the Hijaz Kar Kurd, as mentioned earlier.

== Honours ==
Bashir, especially in his latter years, received international honors for his musical opus and his engagement for the dialog of cultures. Amongst others he was vice president of the UNESCO International Music Council, knight of the French Legion of Honour, and secretary general of the Arabian music academy in Baghdad.

== Discography ==
- Récital a Genève – Solo de Luth "Oud"
- Munir Bashir & the Iraqi Traditional Music Group
- Maqamat
- En Concert a Paris (Live in Paris)
- Meditations
- Flamenco Roots
- Concert in Budapest
- Raga Roots
- Oud Around the Arab World
- The Stockholm Recordings
- Duo de 'Ud (with Omar Bashir)
- L'Art du 'Ud (The Art of the Ud)

== Literature ==
- Sami Asmar: The Musical Legacies Of Sayyid Makkawi, Munir Bashir and Walid Akel. in: Al-Jadid. A Review and Record of Arab culture and arts. Los Angeles 4.1998, H 23.
- Habib Hassan Touma (1996). The Music of the Arabs, trans. Laurie Schwartz. Portland, Oregon: Amadeus Press. ISBN 0-931340-88-8.

== See also ==
- Omar Bashir
- Jamil Bachir
