= List of awards and nominations received by Iggy Azalea =

Iggy Azalea awards and nominations
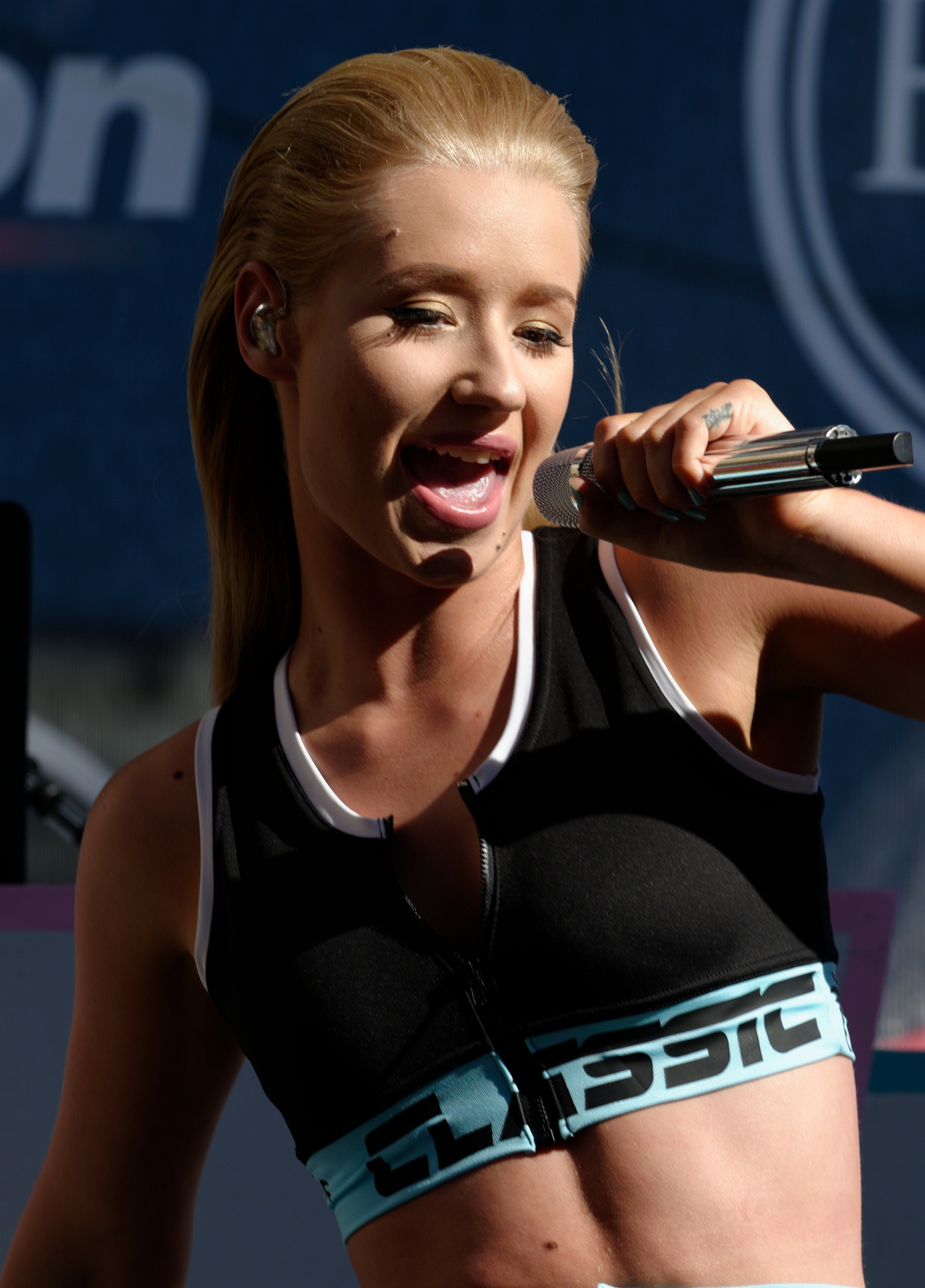
- Azalea performing on ESPY Awards
Awards and nominations
Award	Wins	Nominations
American Music Awards	2	6
ARIA	1	5
Billboard	3	12
Grammy	0	4
MTV Europe	1	8
MTV VMA	1	9
People's Choice	1	2
Teen Choice	4	13

Totals (Note: Certain award groups do not simply award one winner. They acknowledge several different recipients, have runners-up, and have third place. Since this is a specific recognition and is different from losing an award, runner-up mentions are considered wins in this award tally. For simplification and to avoid errors, each award in this list has been presumed to have had a prior nomination.)
- Wins: 40
- Nominations: 131

Iggy Azalea is an Australian rapper. Her debut studio album The New Classic was released in April 2014. Azalea has been nominated for numerous major music awards including the Grammy Awards, MTV Video Music Awards, Billboard Music Awards, BET Awards, American Music Awards and including one Guinness World Record.

Azalea was included on the XXL's Top 10 Freshmen for 2012 by winning a competition for the tenth spot, becoming the first female, and first non-American rapper to be featured on the list. Azalea's first notable nomination was in 2013 by the MTV Video Music Awards where she was up for Artist To Watch for her debut single "Work". 2014 proved to be Azalea's mainstream breakthrough year as she was nominated for several awards from various events. Azalea won her first award from the American Music Awards taking home Favorite Rap/Hip-Hop Artist and Favorite Rap/Hip-Hop Album, while being the most nominated artist of the event in six categories. Azalea was nominated for MTV Video Music Awards, also making her the most nominated artist in the 2014 edition of that event, and won an award with Ariana Grande for Best Pop Video for the single "Problem". Azalea has been nominated for multiple awards in the Australian music industry such as the ARIA Music Awards including a win for Breakthrough Artist.

In 2015, Azalea received four nominations at the 57th Annual Grammy Awards for Best New Artist, Record of the Year and Best Pop Duo/Group Performance for "Fancy" and Best Rap Album for The New Classic. She won Favorite Hip-Hop Artist at the 41st People's Choice Awards. Azalea also led the 2015 iHeartRadio Music Awards nominations with five. She received twelve nominations at the 2015 Billboard Music Awards and won three awards. In 2016, Azalea was presented with the Woman of the Year award by GQ Australia. In 2017, Azalea was nominated for 'Most Buzz worthy International Artist' at the MuchMusic Video Awards for her single Mo Bounce.

== American Music Awards ==
The American Music Awards is an annual music awards ceremony and one of several major American music awards shows. Azalea has received six nominations and two wins.

Year	Nominee / work	Award	Result
2014	Iggy Azalea	Artist of The Year	Nominated
2014	Iggy Azalea	New Artist of The Year	Nominated
2014	Iggy Azalea	Favorite Female Artist - Pop/Rock	Nominated
2014	Iggy Azalea	Favorite Artist - Rap/Hip-Hop	Won
2014	"Fancy" (feat. Charli XCX)	Single of The Year	Nominated
2014	The New Classic	Favorite Album - Rap/Hip-Hop	Won

== ARIA Music Awards ==
The Australian Recording Industry Association Music Awards, commonly known as ARIA Music Awards are held to recognise excellence and innovation and achievement across all genres of Australian music. The inaugural ARIA Awards took place in 1987. Azalea has been nominated five times and won once.

Year	Nominee / work	Award	Result
2014	Iggy Azalea	Best Female Artist	Nominated
2014	The New Classic	Breakthrough Artist - Release	Won
2014	The New Classic	Best Urban Album	Nominated
2014	"Fancy" (feat. Charli XCX)	Song of the Year	Nominated
2015	"Trouble" (feat. Jennifer Hudson)	Song of the Year	Nominated

== ASCAP ==
The American Society of Composers, Authors and Publishers (ASCAP) is a not-for-profit performance rights organization that protects its members' musical copyrights by monitoring public performances of their music, whether via a broadcast or live performance, and compensating them accordingly.

=== ASCAP Pop Music Awards ===
Year	Nominee / work	Award	Result
2015	"Fancy" (feat. Charli XCX)	Most Performed Songs	Won
2015	"Problem" (Ariana Grande feat. Iggy Azalea)	Most Performed Songs	Won
2015	"Black Widow" (feat. Rita Ora)	Most Performed Songs	Won

=== ASCAP Rhythm & Soul Music Awards ===
Year	Nominee / work	Award	Result
2015	"Fancy" (feat. Charli XCX)	Award Winning R&B/Hip-Hop Songs	Won
2015	"No Mediocre" (T.I. feat. Iggy Azalea)	Award Winning R&B/Hip-Hop Songs	Won
2015	"No Mediocre" (T.I. feat. Iggy Azalea)	Award Winning Rap Songs	Won
2015	"Fancy" (feat. Charli XCX)	Award Winning Rap Songs	Won

=== ASCAP Rhythm & Soul Music Awards ===
Year	Nominee / work	Award	Result
2016	Classic Man	Award Winning R&B/Hip-Hop and Rap Songs	Won

== Attitude Magazine Awards ==
The Attitude Magazine Awards have been presented annually by British gay lifestyle magazine Attitude since 2012. Azalea has been nominated once and won.

Year	Nominee / work	Award	Result
2013	Iggy Azalea	Breakthrough Artist	Won

== BBC Radio 1Xtra Hot Summer Awards ==
BBC Radio 1Xtra Hot Summer Awards have been handed out since 2013 by BBC Radio 1Xtra, a British digital radio station by the British Broadcasting Corporation (BBC) specialising in urban music. Azalea has received one win from one nomination.

Year	Nominee / work	Award	Result
2013	Iggy Azalea	Hottie of the Summer	Won

== BET ==
=== BET Awards ===
The BET Awards were established in 2001 by the Black Entertainment Television network. Azalea was nominated twice.

Year	Nominee / work	Award	Result
2014	Iggy Azalea	Best Female Hip-Hop Artist	Nominated
2015	Iggy Azalea	Best Female Hip-Hop Artist	Nominated

=== BET Hip-Hop Awards ===
The BET Hip-Hop Awards are hosted annually by the Black Entertainment Television network for hip-hop performers, producers and music video directors. Azalea has been nominated for three awards and won once.

Year	Nominee / work	Award	Result
2014	"Fancy" (feat. Charli XCX)	Best Hip-Hop Video	Nominated
2014	"Fancy" (feat. Charli XCX)	People's Champ Award	Nominated
2014	Iggy Azalea	Who Blew Up Award	Won

== Billboard ==
=== Billboard.com Mid-Year Awards ===
People can cast their votes for the annual Billboard.com's Mid-Year Music Awards after the first half of a calendar year is complete. Winners are announced at the beginning of July.

Year	Nominee / work	Award	Result
2014	Iggy Azalea	First Half MVP	Nominated
2014	Iggy Azalea	Breakout Star	Won
2014	Iggy Azalea	Best Style	Nominated
2014	"Fancy" (feat. Charli XCX)	Favorite No. 1 Hot 100 Song	Won
2014	"Fancy" (feat. Charli XCX)	Best Music Video	Won
2014	"Problem" (Ariana Grande feat. Iggy Azalea) (At Billboard Music Awards 2014)	Best Music Video	Nominated
2014	"Problem" (Ariana Grande feat. Iggy Azalea) (At Billboard Music Awards 2014)	Best Televised Performance	Won
2015	Iggy Azalea and Nick Young	Hottest Couple	Nominated
2015	Britney Spears and Iggy Azalea Debut "Pretty Girls" Single	Most Buzzed-About Moment	Nominated

=== Billboard Music Awards ===
The Billboard Music Award is an honor given by Billboard magazine, a publication and music popularity chart covering the music business. Azalea received twelve nominations and won three in 2015.

Year	Nominee / work	Award	Result
2015	Iggy Azalea	Top New Artist	Nominated
2015	Iggy Azalea	Top Female Artist	Nominated
2015	Iggy Azalea	Top Hot 100 Artist	Nominated
2015	Iggy Azalea	Top Digital Songs Artist	Nominated
2015	Iggy Azalea	Top Streaming Artist	Won
2015	Iggy Azalea	Top Rap Artist	Won
2015	Iggy Azalea	Billboard Chart Achievement Award	Nominated
2015	The New Classic	Top Rap Album	Nominated
2015	"Fancy" (feat. Charli XCX)	Top Hot 100 Song	Nominated
2015	"Fancy" (feat. Charli XCX)	Top Streaming Song (Audio)	Nominated
2015	"Fancy" (feat. Charli XCX)	Top Rap Song	Won
2015	"Black Widow" (feat. Rita Ora)	Top Rap Song	Nominated

=== Billboard Women in Music Awards ===
The Billboard Women in Music Awards is an annual awards ceremony presented by Billboard magazine. Azalea was honored with an award on its 9th edition.

Year	Nominee / work	Award	Result
2014	Iggy Azalea	Chart-Topper	Won

== Capricho Awards ==
The Capricho Awards are an annual award show with categories consisting of music, television, film, internet, among others, created by popular Brazilian magazine Capricho, with voting open on Editora Abril's official website. Azalea has been nominated five times and she has won two times.

Year	Recipient / Nominated work	Award	Result
2014	"Fancy" (Iggy Azalea feat. Charli XCX)	Best International Video	Nominated
2014	"Fancy" (Iggy Azalea feat. Charli XCX)	Best International Hit	Nominated
2014	"Problem" (Ariana Grande feat. Iggy Azalea)	Best International Hit	Won
2014	"Problem" (Ariana Grande feat. Iggy Azalea)	Best Collaboration	Won
2014	Iggy Azalea	International Breakthrough Act	Nominated

== Channel V Australia ==
The [V] Oz Artist of the Year award is chosen by the Australian public, and presented annually by Channel V Australia. Azalea has been nominated twice.

Year	Nominee / work	Award	Result
2013	Iggy Azalea	V Oz Artist of the Year	Nominated
2014	Iggy Azalea	V Oz Artist of the Year	Nominated

== Cosmopolitan Fun Fearless Female Awards ==
The Cosmopolitan Fun Fearless Female Awards is an annual awards show presented by Cosmopolitan magazine to celebrate Australian women. Azalea has been nominated once.

Year	Nominee / work	Award	Result
2014	Iggy Azalea	Favourite Singer	Nominated

== Glamour Women of the Year Awards ==
The Glamour Women of the Year is an annual award ceremony presented by English magazine Glamour. Azalea has received two nominations.

Year	Nominee / work	Award	Result
2015	Iggy Azalea	International Musician/Solo Artist	Nominated
2015	Iggy Azalea	NEXT Breakthrough	Nominated

== GQ Australia Men of the Year Awards ==
The GQ Men of the Year Awards are awarded annually by men's magazine GQ. Azalea won the Woman of the Year award presented by its Australian publication in 2016.

Year	Nominee / work	Award	Result
2016	Iggy Azalea	Woman of the Year	Won

== Grammy Awards ==
The Grammy Awards are awarded annually by the National Academy of Recording Arts and Sciences of the United States. Azalea received four nominations in 2015, including Best New Artist and Record of the Year.

Year	Nominee / work	Award	Result
2015	Iggy Azalea	Best New Artist	Nominated
2015	"Fancy" (featuring Charli XCX)	Record of the Year	Nominated
2015	"Fancy" (featuring Charli XCX)	Best Pop Duo/Group Performance	Nominated
2015	The New Classic	Best Rap Album	Nominated

== Guinness World Records ==
The Guinness World Records, known from its inception from 1955 until 2000 as The Guinness Book of Records and in previous United States editions as The Guinness Book of World Records, is a reference work published annually, listing world record both of human achievements and the extremes of the natural world. Azalea currently holds one record.

Year	Nominee / work	Award	Result	Ref.
2014	"Fancy"	Most weeks at No.1 on the US singles chart for a rap single by a female artist	Won	

== iHeartRadio Music Awards ==
The iHeartRadio Music Awards is an international music awards show founded by iHeartRadio in 2014 to celebrate the year's top artists and music played across iHeartMedia's network. Azalea received five nominations in 2015.

Year	Nominee / work	Award	Result
2015	Iggy Azalea	Artist of the Year	Nominated
2015	Iggy Azalea	Best New Artist	Nominated
2015	Iggy Azalea	Renegade	Nominated
2015	"Fancy" (feat. Charli XCX)	Best Collaboration	Nominated
2015	"Problem" (Ariana Grande feat. Iggy Azalea)	Best Collaboration	Nominated

== International Dance Music Awards ==
The International Dance Music Awards (IDMA) is an annual awards ceremony presented at the Winter Music Conference which is held every March since 1985 in Miami Beach, Florida.

Year	Nominee / work	Award	Result
2015	"Fancy" (feat. Charli XCX)	Best Rap/Hip Hop/Trap Dance Track	Nominated
2015	"Booty" (Jennifer Lopez feat. Iggy Azalea)	Best Commercial/Pop Dance Track	Nominated

== MOBO Awards ==
The MOBO Awards (an acronym for Music of Black Origin) were established in 1996 by Kanya King and are held annually in the United Kingdom to recognize artists of any race or nationality performing music of black origin. Azalea has been nominated twice.

Year	Nominee / work	Award	Result
2013	Iggy Azalea	Best International Act	Nominated
2014	Iggy Azalea	Best International Act	Nominated

== MP3 Music Awards ==
The MP3 Music Awards (MMA) were established in 2007 to honour popular artists and quality MP3 players and retailers. Azalea has won one award.

Year	Nominee / work	Award	Result
2014	"Booty" (Jennifer Lopez feat. Iggy Azalea)	The BFV Award Best / Female / Vocalist	Won

== MTV Awards ==
=== MTV Europe Music Awards ===
The MTV Europe Music Awards (EMA) were established in 1994 by MTV Networks Europe. Azalea has been nominated eight times and won once.

Year	Recipient	Award	Result
2013	Iggy Azalea	Best Push Act	Nominated
2013	Iggy Azalea	Best Australian Act	Nominated
2014	Iggy Azalea	Best Australian Act	Nominated
2014	"Problem" (Ariana Grande feat. Iggy Azalea)	Best Song	Won
2014	"Black Widow" (feat. Rita Ora)	Best Video	Nominated
2014	Iggy Azalea	Best Hip Hop	Nominated
2014	Iggy Azalea	Best Look	Nominated
2015	Iggy Azalea (Wireless Festival, London, UK 2014)	Best World Stage	Nominated

=== MTV Italia Awards ===
The MTV Awards are an annual show established by MTV Italia to celebrate the most popular music and events in Italy.

Year	Nominee / work	Award	Result
2015	Iggy Azalea	Best Artist From The World	Nominated

=== MTV Millennial Awards ===
The MTV Millennial Awards were established in 2013 by MTV Latino.

Year	Nominee / work	Award	Result
2014	"Problem" (Ariana Grande feat. Iggy Azalea)	Hit of the Year	Nominated

=== MTV Video Music Awards ===
The MTV Video Music Awards were established in 1984 by MTV to celebrate the top music videos of the year. Azalea has been nominated nine times and won once.

Year	Nominee / work	Award	Result
2013	"Work"	Artist To Watch	Nominated
2014	"Fancy" (feat. Charli XCX)	Video of the Year	Nominated
2014	"Fancy" (feat. Charli XCX)	Best Female Video	Nominated
2014	"Fancy" (feat. Charli XCX)	Best Art Direction	Nominated
2014	"Fancy" (feat. Charli XCX)	Best Pop Video	Nominated
2014	"Problem" (Ariana Grande feat. Iggy Azalea)	Best Pop Video	Won
2014	"Problem" (Ariana Grande feat. Iggy Azalea)	Best Collaboration	Nominated
2014	"Problem" (Ariana Grande feat. Iggy Azalea)	Best Female Video	Nominated
2014	"Problem" (Ariana Grande feat. Iggy Azalea)	Best Lyric Video	Nominated

=== MTV Video Music Awards Japan ===
The MTV Video Music Awards Japan are the Japanese version of the MTV Video Music Awards established in 2002.

Year	Nominee / work	Award	Result
2015	"Problem" (Ariana Grande feat. Iggy Azalea)	Best Female Video – International	Won

=== mtvU Woodie Awards ===
The Woodie Awards were established by MTV in 2004 to recognise the best in music as voted for by college students. Azalea has been nominated twice.

Year	Nominee / work	Award	Result
2012	Iggy Azalea	Breakthrough Woodie	Nominated
2014	"Bounce"	Best Video Woodie	Nominated

== MuchMusic Video Awards ==
The MuchMusic Video Awards is an annual awards ceremony presented by the Canadian music video channel MuchMusic. Azalea has received three nominations.

Year	Nominee / work	Award	Result
2014	"Fancy" (feat. Charli XCX)	International Video of the Year	Nominated
2015	"Black Widow" (feat. Rita Ora)	Most Buzzworthy International Artist or Group	Nominated
2017	"Mo Bounce"	Most Buzzworthy International Artist or Group	Nominated

== NewNowNext Awards ==
The NewNowNext Awards is an American annual entertainment awards show, presented by the lesbian, gay, bisexual and transgender-themed channel Logo. Launched in 2008, awards are presented both for LGBT-specific and general interest achievements in entertainment and pop culture. Azalea has been nominated once in 2014.

Year	Nominee / work	Award	Result
2014	Iggy Azalea	Best New Female Musician	Nominated

== Nickelodeon Kids' Choice Awards ==
The Nickelodeon Kids' Choice Awards, also known as the KCAs or Kids Choice Awards, is an annual awards show that airs on the Nickelodeon cable channel, that honors the year's biggest entertainment acts, as voted by Nickelodeon viewers.

Year	Nominee / work	Award	Result
2015	"Fancy" (feat. Charli XCX)	Favorite Song of the Year	Nominated
2015	"Problem" (Ariana Grande feat. Iggy Azalea)	Favorite Song of the Year	Nominated
2015	Iggy Azalea	Favorite New Artist	Nominated
2015	Iggy Azalea	Favorite Aussie/Kiwi Music Act	Nominated

== NME Awards ==
The NME Awards are an annual music awards show founded by British weekly music publication NME. Azalea has been nominated once and won in 2015.

Year	Nominee / work	Award	Result
2015	"Fancy" (feat. Charli XCX)	Dancefloor Filler	Won

== NRJ Music Awards ==
The NRJ Music Awards were created in 2000 by French radio station NRJ in partnership with the television network TF1. Azalea has received two nominations.

Year	Nominee / work	Award	Result
2014	Iggy Azalea	International Breakthrough of the Year	Nominated
2014	"Problem" (Ariana Grande feat. Iggy Azalea)	International Song of the Year	Nominated

== O Music Awards ==
The O Music Awards are one of the major annual awards established by Viacom to honor the art, creativity, personality and technology of music into the digital space. Azalea has been nominated once in 2012.

Year	Nominee / work	Award	Result
2012	Iggy Azalea	Best Web-Born Artist	Nominated

== People's Choice Awards ==
The People's Choice Awards is an American awards show established in 1974 that recognizes the people and the work of popular culture and is voted on by the general public. Azalea has received two nominations and won once.

Year	Nominee / work	Award	Result
2015	Iggy Azalea	Favorite Female Artist	Nominated
2015	Iggy Azalea	Favorite Hip-Hop Artist	Won

== Radio Disney Music Awards ==
The Radio Disney Music Awards (RDMA) is an annual awards show which is operated and governed by Radio Disney, an American radio network, and televised on Disney Channel.

Year	Nominee / work	Award	Result
2015	"Problem" (Ariana Grande feat. Iggy Azalea)	Song Of The Year	Won

== Rolling Stone Australia Awards ==
The Rolling Stone Australia Awards are awarded annually in January or February by the Australian edition of Rolling Stone magazine for outstanding contributions to popular culture in the previous year.

Year	Nominee / work	Award	Result	Ref.
2023	Iggy Azalea	Rolling Stone Global Award	Nominated	

== RTHK International Pop Poll Awards ==
The RTHK International Pop Poll Awards is an annual award show presented at RTHK Studio 1 that honors the best in international and national music established in 1989. Azalea has received one award. (Note: At this award show, runners-up are considered winners in spite of being in second or third place.)

Year	Nominee / work	Award	Result	Ref.
2016	"Fast And Furious 7"	Best Selling OST	Won	

== Soul Train Music Awards ==
The Soul Train Music Awards is an annual award show aired in national broadcast syndication that honors the best in African American music and entertainment established in 1987. Azalea has been nominated two times in 2014.

Year	Nominee / work	Award	Result
2014	"Fancy" (feat. Charli XCX)	Best Hip-Hop Song of The Year	Nominated
2014	"No Mediocre" (T.I. feat. Iggy Azalea)	Best Hip-Hop Song of The Year	Nominated

== Teen Choice Awards ==
The Teen Choice Awards were established in 1999 to honor the year's biggest achievements in music, movies, sports and television, being voted by young people aged between 13 and 19. Azalea has won four awards from thirteen nominations.

Year	Nominee / work	Award	Result
2014	Iggy Azalea	Choice R&B/Hip-Hop Artist	Won
2014	Iggy Azalea	Candie's Choice Style Icon	Nominated
2014	Iggy Azalea	Choice Summer Music Star: Female	Nominated
2014	"Fancy" (feat. Charli XCX)	Choice Summer Song	Nominated
2014	"Fancy" (feat. Charli XCX)	Choice R&B/Hip-Hop Song	Won
2014	"Fancy" (feat. Charli XCX)	Choice Single Female Artist	Nominated
2014	"Problem" (Ariana Grande feat. Iggy Azalea)	Choice Single Female Artist	Won
2015	Iggy Azalea	Choice Female Artist	Nominated
2015	Iggy Azalea	Choice R&B/Hip-Hop Artist	Nominated
2015	Choice Movie Action	"Fast And Furious"	Won
2015	Choice Song: Female & Choice Music: Collaboration	"Pretty Girls" (Britney Spears & Iggy Azalea)	Nominated
2016	Iggy Azalea	Choice R&B/Hip-Hop Artist	Nominated
2016	"Team"	Choice R&B/Hip-Hop Song	Nominated

== The Boombox Fan Choice Awards ==
The Boombox Fan Choice Awards are presented by American hip-hop online publication The Boombox since 2014. Azalea has received four nominations and won once.

Year	Recipient / Nominated work	Award	Result
2014	"Change Your Life" (Iggy Azalea feat. T.I)	Hip-Hop Video of the Year	Won
2015^{[67]}	"Fancy" (Iggy Azalea feat. Charli XCX)	Hip-Hop Video of the Year	Nominated
2015^{[67]}	"Fancy" (Iggy Azalea feat. Charli XCX)	Hip-Hop Song of the Year	Nominated
2015^{[67]}	"Booty" (Jennifer Lopez feat. Iggy Azalea)	R&B Video of the Year	Nominated

== The Streamer Awards ==
The Streamer Awards are an annual awards show dedicated to live streamers.

Year	Recipient / Nominated work	Award	Result
2026	Iggy Azalea and N3on	Best Mainstream Collab	Pending

== UK Music Video Awards ==
The UK Music Video Awards are organised by two of the key members of the team behind bug www.bugvideos.co.uk, the bfi southbank's highly successful music video strand. Azalea has been nominated four times.

Year	Recipient	Award	Result
2013	"Work"	Best Urban Video	Nominated
2013	"Work"	Best Styling in a Video	Nominated
2014	"Change Your Life" (feat. T.I.)	Best Urban Video	Nominated
2014	"Fancy" (feat. Charli XCX)	Best Styling in a Video	Nominated

== Urban Music Awards ==
The Urban Music Awards (UMA) is a hip-hop, R&B, dance and soul music awards ceremony launched by Jordan Kensington in 2003 and now held in six countries annually by the Invincible Media Group. Azalea has been nominated once.

Year	Recipient	Award	Result
2014	Iggy Azalea	Best International Artist	Nominated

== Young Hollywood Awards ==
The Young Hollywood Awards are presented annually honouring the years' biggest achievements in pop music, movies, sports, television, fashion and more, as voted on by teenagers aged 13–19 and young adults. Azalea has won one award from three nominations.

Year	Nominee / work	Award	Result
2014	Iggy Azalea	Hottest Music Artist	Nominated
2014	"Fancy" (feat. Charli XCX)	Song of the Summer/DJ Replay	Won
2014	"Problem" (Ariana Grande feat. Iggy Azalea)	Song of the Summer/DJ Replay	Nominated

== 4Music Video Honours ==
4Music Video Honours is an end of year fan voted award show presented by 4Music, a music and entertainment channel in the United Kingdom and available on some digital television providers in the Republic of Ireland launched in 2008, with the results being revealed on an annual TV special program.

Year	Nominee / work	Award	Result
2013	Iggy Azalea	Best Breakthrough	Nominated
2014	Iggy Azalea	Best Girl	Nominated
