= People's Choice Award for Favorite Hip Hop Artist =

Annual pop culture award

People's Choice Award for Favorite Hip-Hop Artist
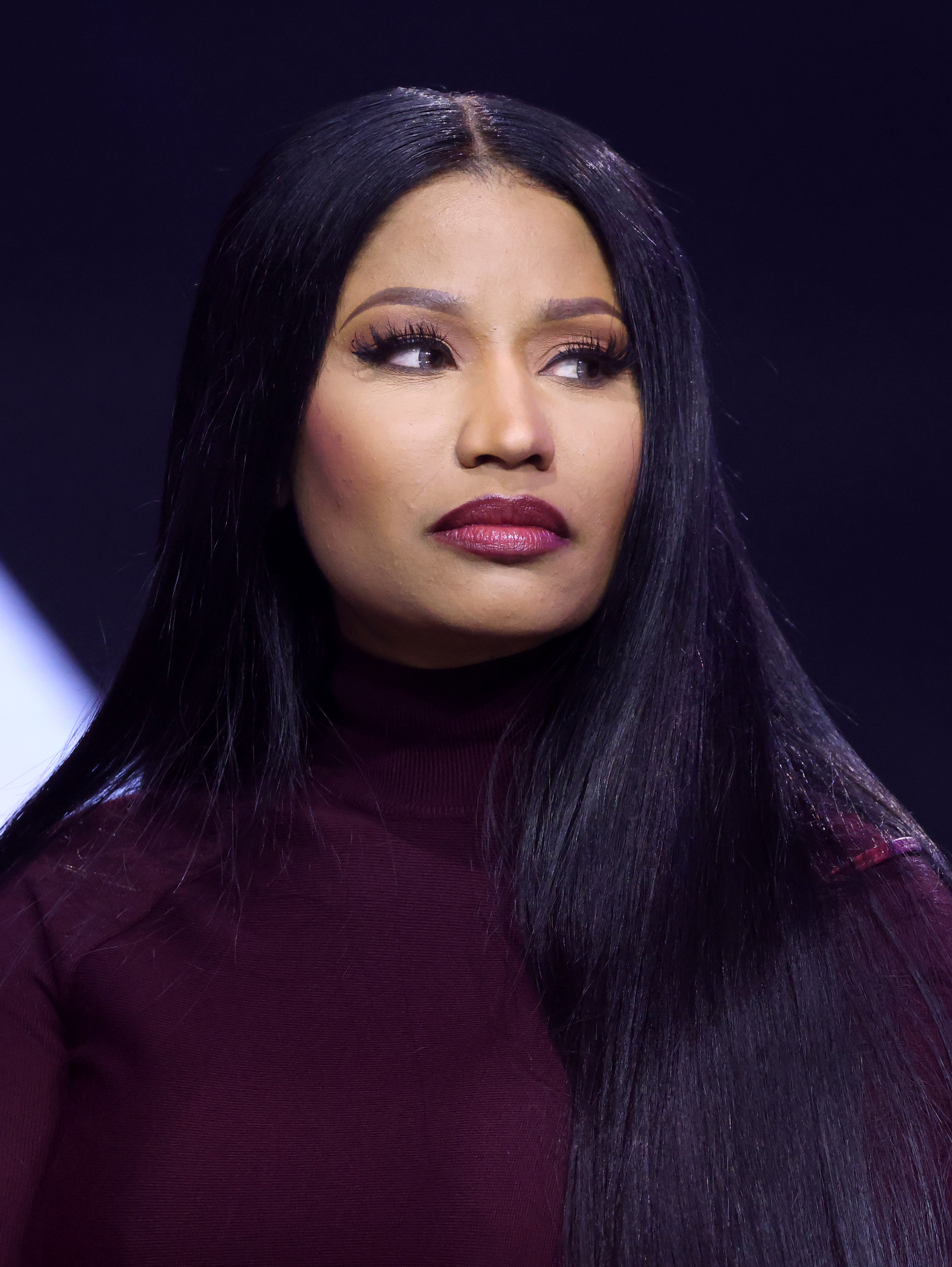
- Nicki Minaj is the most recent recipient
- Country: United States
- Presented by: People's Choice Awards
- First award: Eminem (2010)
- Currently held by: Nicki Minaj (2024)

Highlights
- Most wins: Eminem; Nicki Minaj (3 each)
- Most nominations: Drake; Jay-Z (6 each)

The People's Choice Award for Favorite Hip-Hop Artist is one of the awards handed out at the yearly People's Choice Awards. It was first awarded in 2010 and presented to American rapper Eminem. After seven consecutive years, it was shortly discontinued in 2018 and did not return until 2024 where Trinidadian rapper Nicki Minaj became the latest recipient to hold the award. Both artists holds the record for the most wins (3) with rappers Drake and Jay-Z having the most nominations each (6).

== Winners and nominees ==
Year (Note: Each year is linked to the article about the People's Choice Awards held that year.)	Artists	Ref.
2010
2010	Eminem	
2010	Flo Rida	
2010	Jay-Z	
2010	Lil' Wayne	
2010	T.I.	
2011
2011	Eminem	
2011	Drake	
2011	Ludacris	
2011	Jay-Z	
2011	Snoop Dogg	
2012
2012	Eminem	
2012	B.o.B	
2012	Pitbull	
2012	Jay-Z	
2012	Nicki Minaj	
2013
2013	Nicki Minaj	
2013	Drake	
2013	Flo Rida	
2013	Jay-Z	
2013	Pitbull	
2014
2014	Macklemore & Ryan Lewis	
2014	Drake	
2014	Jay-Z	
2014	Kanye West	
2014	Lil Wayne	
2015
2015	Iggy Azalea	
2015	Drake	
2015	Jay-Z	
2015	Nicki Minaj	
2015	T.I.	
2016
2016	Nicki Minaj	
2016	Drake	
2016	Kendrick Lamar	
2016	Big Sean	
2016	Wiz Khalifa	
2017
2017	G-Eazy	
2017	DJ Khaled	
2017	Kendrick Lamar	
2017	Kanye West	
2017	Wiz Khalifa	
2024
2024	Nicki Minaj	
2024	Cardi B	
2024	Drake	
2024	Future	
2024	Jack Harlow	
2024	Latto	
2024	Post Malone	
2024	Travis Scott	

== Artists with multiple nominations ==
6 nominations

- Drake
- Jay-Z

5 nominations

- Nicki Minaj

3 nominations

- Eminem

2 nominations

- Flo Rida
- Kanye West
- Pitbull
- T.I.
- Wiz Khalifa
