= Enrique Iglesias and Pitbull Live =

2017 co-headlining concert tour

Enrique Iglesias and Pitbull Live!
- Continental tour by Enrique Iglesias and Pitbull
- Promotional poster for the tour
- Location: North America
- Start date: June 3, 2017
- End date: November 22, 2017
- Legs: 2
- No. of shows: 35 in North America
Enrique Iglesias tour chronology
Sex and Love Tour (2014–2017)	Enrique Iglesias and Pitbull Live! (2017)	All the Hits Live (2018–2019)
Pitbull tour chronology
The Bad Man Tour (2016)	Enrique Iglesias and Pitbull Live! (2017)	I Feel Good Tour (2021)

Enrique Iglesias and Pitbull Live! was a co-headlining concert tour by Spanish singer Enrique Iglesias and American rapper Pitbull. This is the second time Iglesias and Pitbull tour together, following their 2014-15 joint tour. Latin boy group CNCO was announced as the opening act for most of the American dates.

The tour played nearly 40 shows in the United States and Canada. It placed 24th on Pollstar's annual "Top 200 North American Tours", earning $42.8 million with 422,959 tickets sold.

== Critical reception ==
Suzette Fernandez from Billboard magazine highlighted Iglesias set, writing that he "does not need extras to impress". Furthermore, she wrote: "His musicians, a good repertoire and the audience chanting his songs are more than enough to make a good evening." Regarding to Pitbull, the writer said that he "heated up the night with a great repertoire" where "dance is mandatory".

== Setlist ==
The following setlists were obtained from the concert held on October 6, 2017; at the Xcel Energy Center in Saint Paul, Minnesota. It does not represent all concerts for the duration of the tour.

Pitbull
1. "Feel This Moment"
2. "Hey Baby (Drop It to the Floor)"
3. "International Love"
4. "The Anthem"
5. "Don't Stop the Party"
6. "Rain Over Me"
7. "Hey Ma"
8. "Shake Señora"
9. "Bailar"
10. "Bon, Bon"
11. "Go Girl"
12. "Hotel Room Service"
13. "Fireball"
14. "Shake"
15. "Culo"
16. "I Know You Want Me (Calle Ocho)"
17. "Time of Our Lives"
18. "Timber"
19. "Give Me Everything"
Enrique Iglesias
1. "Súbeme la Radio"
2. "I'm a Freak"
3. "I Like How It Feels"
4. "Duele el Corazón"
5. "Bailamos"
6. "Loco"
7. "Knockin' on Heaven's Door"
8. "Be With You"
9. "Escape"
10. "Seven Nation Army"
11. "Tonight (I'm Lovin' You)"
12. "Hero"
13. "El Perdón"
14. "Bailando"
15. "I Like It"

== Tour dates ==
List of concerts, showing date, city, country, venue, opening act, tickets sold, number of available tickets and amount of gross revenue
Date	City	Country	Venue	Opening act	Attendance	Revenue
June 3, 2017	Rosemont	United States	Allstate Arena	CNCO	13,185 / 13,185	$1,334,060
June 6, 2017	Denver	United States	Pepsi Center	CNCO	10,908 / 10,908	$883,351
June 8, 2017	Sacramento	United States	Golden 1 Center	CNCO	13,197 / 13,197	$1,208,829
June 9, 2017	San Jose	United States	SAP Center	CNCO	13,109 / 13,109	$1,366,988
June 10, 2017	Los Angeles	United States	Staples Center	CNCO	14,523 / 14,523	$1,804,583
June 14, 2017	Phoenix	United States	Talking Stick Resort Arena	CNCO	12,993 / 12,993	$1,183,861
June 16, 2017	Dallas	United States	American Airlines Center	CNCO	13,631 / 13,631	$1,372,890
June 17, 2017	San Antonio	United States	AT&T Center	CNCO	14,241 / 14,241	$1,237,338
June 18, 2017	Houston	United States	Toyota Center	CNCO	12,062 / 12,062	$1,234,434
June 22, 2017	Tampa	United States	Amalie Arena	CNCO	10,341 / 10,341	$779,137
June 23, 2017	Miami	United States	American Airlines Arena	CNCO	12,396 / 12,396	$1,322,095
June 25, 2017	Duluth	United States	Infinite Energy Arena	CNCO	9,964 / 9,964	$892,678
June 28, 2017	Auburn Hills	United States	The Palace of Auburn Hills	CNCO	11,787 / 11,787	$846,989
June 30, 2017	New York City	United States	Madison Square Garden	CNCO	25,118 / 25,118	$2,686,998
July 1, 2017	New York City	United States	Madison Square Garden	CNCO	25,118 / 25,118	$2,686,998
October 3, 2017	Washington, D.C.	United States	Capital One Arena	CNCO	12,699 / 12,699	$1,138,965
October 6, 2017	Saint Paul	United States	Xcel Energy Center	CNCO	13,056 / 13,056	$971,180
October 7, 2017	Rosemont	United States	Allstate Arena	CNCO	13,091 / 13,091	$1,242,275
October 9, 2017	Montreal	Canada	Bell Centre	CNCO	15,939 / 15,939	$1,310,360
October 10, 2017	Newark	United States	Prudential Center	CNCO	10,312 / 10,312	$852,821
October 12, 2017	Boston	United States	TD Garden	CNCO	10,535 / 10,535	$1,032,208
October 13, 2017	Philadelphia	United States	Wells Fargo Center	CNCO	9,978 / 9,978	$783,981
October 14, 2017	Toronto	Canada	Air Canada Centre	CNCO	27,605 / 27,605	$2,486,400
October 15, 2017	Toronto	Canada	Air Canada Centre	CNCO	27,605 / 27,605	$2,486,400
October 20, 2017	Fresno	United States	Save Mart Center	CNCO	11,122 / 11,122	$1,098,436
October 21, 2017	Anaheim	United States	Honda Center	CNCO	11,566 / 11,566	$1,195,639
October 22, 2017	San Diego	United States	Valley View Casino Center	CNCO	9,433 / 9,433	$909,694
October 27, 2017	Inglewood	United States	The Forum	CNCO	11,597 / 11,597	$1,172,169
October 28, 2017	Oakland	United States	Oracle Arena	CNCO	12,226 / 12,226	$1,059,990
November 11, 2017	Miami	United States	American Airlines Arena	Becky G	11,105 / 11,105	$1,101,217
November 14, 2017	Orlando	United States	Amway Center	Becky G	10,172 / 10,172	$777,907
November 16, 2017	Houston	United States	Toyota Center	Becky G	10,046 / 10,046	$721,291
November 19, 2017	Corpus Christi	United States	American Bank Center	Angeles	8,495 / 8,495	$597,800
November 21, 2017	Laredo	United States	Laredo Energy Arena	Angeles	8,750 / 8,750	$794,152
November 22, 2017	Austin	United States	Frank Erwin Center	Angeles	9,775 / 9,775	$605,386
Total					414,957 / 414,957	$38,006,035

Cancellations and rescheduled shows

July 5, 2017	Montreal, Canada	Bell Centre	Rescheduled to October 9, 2017
July 6, 2017	Toronto, Canada	Air Canada Centre	Rescheduled to October 15, 2017
September 22, 2017	Dallas, Texas	American Airlines Center	Rescheduled to November 16, 2017
September 23, 2017	Laredo, Texas	Laredo Energy Arena	Rescheduled to November 21, 2017
September 24, 2017	Austin, Texas	Frank Erwin Center	Rescheduled to November 22, 2017
September 26, 2017	Corpus Christi, Texas	American Bank Center	Rescheduled to November 19, 2017
September 29, 2017	Orlando, Florida	Amway Center	Rescheduled to November 14, 2017
September 30, 2017	Miami, Florida	American Airlines Arena	Rescheduled to November 11, 2017

== Personnel ==
Production companies

- Lighting: Christie Lites
- Video: PRG Nocturne
- Video Content: Travis Shirley Live Design, Lightborne, Blink, Gravity
- Staging: All Access Staging & Productions
- Pyro: Pyrotek Special Effects
- Lasers: ER Productions

Pitbull

- Tour Producer: Macarena Moreno
- Tour Manager: Frida Karlsson
- Production Manager: Ernesto Corti
- Production Coordinator: Sara Parsons
- Stage Manager: Raymundo "Lefty" Barajas
- Lighting Designer: Tom Sutherland/DX7 Design Ltd.
- Lighting Director & Programmer: Craig Caserta
- Media Server Programmer: Nick Hanson
- Video Director: Brian "Bubba" Ress
- Video Creative Director: Brian Burke
- Hippo Tech: Jeffery Cady
- Laser Programmer: Lawrence Wright
- Laser Operator: John Borschelding

Enrique Iglesias

- Production & Show Director: Travis Shirley
- Production Manager: Andres Restrepo
- Tour Manager: Abel Tabuyo
- Production Coordinator: Misty Roberts
- Production Assistant: Gala Santos
- Stage Manager: Leonardo Roman
- Lighting Director: Cassady Miller-Halloran
- Associate Lighting Designer: Trevor Ahlstrand
- Lighting Programmer: Nate Alves, Trevor Ahlstrand
- Lighting Crew Chief: Brandon Leedham
- Lighting Techs: Marc Durning, Jacob Alexander, Kyle Lovan, Oliver DeKegel, Austin Bloomfield, David Schmieder, Jon Drlicka
- Video Director: Jorge Toro
- Video Engineer: Brian "Bubba" Ress
- Video Techs: Kenny Ackerman, Taylor Espitee, Tom Cesano, Johnny Martinez, DJ Stokes, Steve Haskins, Martin Jimenez
- LED Lead: Taylor Espitee
- LED Tech/Camera Operator: Johnny Martinez, Tommy Cesano
- Projection Lead: Dino "DJ" Stokes
- Catalyst Programmer: Tyler Munson
- Laser Tech: Luis Alfredo "Koach" Collazo
- Pyro Techs: Gregg Pearson, Amy Stein, Paul Cusato, Dave Harkness
- Riggers: Kenneth Mitchell, Jeremy Caldwell
- Carpenters: Chuwe Asp, Daniela MacCallum, Deonte Matthews, Jesus Arroyo, Kyle Duarte, Dyland Levely
