= I Feel Good Tour =

2021 concert tour by Pitbull

- National tour by Pitbull
- Promotional poster for the tour
- Location: U.S., North America
- Start date: August 20, 2021
- End date: October 13, 2021
- No. of shows: 32
- Box office: $20.3 million
Pitbull tour chronology
Enrique Iglesias and Pitbull Live! (2016)	I Feel Good Tour (2021)	Can't Stop Us Now Tour (2022)

The I Feel Good Tour was a concert tour by American rapper Pitbull. This is the sixth tour Pitbull has done, following his 2017 joint tour with Enrique Iglesias titled "Enrique Iglesias and Pitbull Live!. Australian rapper Iggy Azalea was announced as the opening act for the tour.

The duo played shows in 32 cities in the United States. It placed 25th on Pollstar's annual "Top 200 North American Tours", and 26th worldwide earning $20.3 million with 424,545 tickets sold.

== Critical reception ==
Claude Sawyer from 315 Music stated "The man never stopped smiling. For over ninety minutes he danced, jumped, and ran across the amphitheater stage, never staying in one place too long. An enormous video wall and steel staircase took up the center of the stage, and as the dancers would emerge from atop this staircase and descend onto the stage, Pitbull would ascend the stairs to the platform on top where he could get a bird’s eye view of the sizable crowd. During several songs, he would sing duets with singers on the video wall. Christina Aguilera appeared for “Feel This Moment”, Ke$ha for “Timber”, and Jennifer Lopez for “On the Floor.” Cryo jets sent pillars of fog high into the air, adding an interesting effect when paired with the next level lighting production. During “Fireball” the pyro effects were set off toward the back of the stage, but could be felt in the front row." Will Loschiavo of "Out In Jersey" commented on Iggy Azaleas set stating "Iggy Azalea’s opening act lasts for approximately fifty minutes and consists of a 14-track setlist. Iggy’s vocals are on point, radiating old-school R&B vibes, and her choreography is solid. Standouts include “Team” and “Black Widow,” which are performed within the first 15 minutes, so make sure to arrive on time, if not early. “Kream,” Pretty Girls,” and an epic finale with “Fancy,” one of the biggest songs of the last decade, highlight the second half of the setlist. All in all, Iggy Azalea is the perfect opening act to get the party started in anticipation of Mr. 305."

== Tour Dates ==
Date	City	Country	Venue
August 20, 2021	Clarkston	United States	DTE Energy Music Theatre
August 22, 2021	Tinley Park	United States	Hollywood Casino Amphitheatre
August 27, 2021	Syracuse	United States	St. Joseph's Health Amphitheater
August 28, 2021	Mansfield	United States	Xfinity Center
August 29, 2021	Gilford	United States	Bank of New Hampshire Pavilion
August 31, 2021	Virginia Beach	United States	Veterans United Home Loans Amphitheater
September 2, 2021	Columbia	United States	Merriweather Post Pavilion
September 3, 2021	Bethel	United States	Bethel Woods Center for the Arts
September 4, 2021	Wantagh	United States	Jones Beach Theater
September 5, 2021	Holmdel Township	United States	PNC Bank Arts Center
September 8, 2021	Rogers	United States	Walmart Arkansas Music Pavilion
September 10, 2021	The Woodlands	United States	Cynthia Woods Mitchell Pavilion
September 11, 2021	Dallas	United States	Dos Equis Pavilion
September 12, 2021	Austin	United States	Germania Insurance Amphitheater
September 16, 2021	Albuquerque	United States	Isleta Amphitheater
September 17, 2021	Phoenix	United States	Ak-Chin Pavilion
September 18, 2021	Las Vegas	United States	Zappos Theater
September 19, 2021	Chula Vista	United States	North Island Credit Union Amphitheatre
September 22, 2021	Inglewood	United States	YouTube Theater
September 24, 2021	Irvine	United States	FivePoint Amphitheater
September 25, 2021	Fresno	United States	Save Mart Center
September 26, 2021	Mountain View	United States	Shoreline Amphitheatre
September 28, 2021	Auburn	United States	White River Amphitheatre
September 29, 2021	Kennewick	United States	Toyota Center
October 1, 2021	Denver	United States	Ball Arena
October 2, 2021	West Valley City	United States	USANA Amphitheatre
October 6, 2021	Kansas City	United States	Starlight Theatre
October 7, 2021	Nashville	United States	Bridgestone Arena
October 9, 2021	Charlotte	United States	PNC Music Pavilion
October 10, 2021	Alpharetta	United States	Ameris Bank Amphitheatre
October 12, 2021	Jacksonville	United States	Daily's Place
October 13, 2021	Tampa	United States	MidFlorida Credit Union Amphitheatre
