= Pussy (Iggy Azalea song) =

"Pu$$y"

Song by Iggy Azalea

from the album Ignorant Art
- Released: 31 August 2011
- Recorded: 2011
- Genre: Hip hop; dirty rap
- Length: 2:43
- Label: Self-released
- Lyricist: Iggy Azalea
- Producers: Chordz 3D and Fuego from D.R.U.G.S.

"Pussy" (stylized as "Pu$$y") is a song by Australian rapper Iggy Azalea, taken from her debut mixtape, Ignorant Art (2011). The song is a hip-hop and dirty rap song produced by Chordz 3D and Fuego from D.R.U.G.S., and was recorded in 2011. Azalea uploaded the song's music video on YouTube in August 2011, where it went viral, helping to propel the young rapper to prominence. The song would later be released on Ignorant Art on the 27th of September, as the fourth track of the project. Azalea has performed the track regularly since its release as a part of her live shows setlist, including on her 2014 concert tour The New Classic Tour.

== Background and development ==
"Pu$$y" was recorded in Los Angeles in 2011, where Azalea had been residing since 2010 after migrating from Australia to Miami in prior years to pursue her rap career, and was produced by Chordz 3D and Fuego from D.R.U.G.S., the production team behind her debut mixtape Ignorant Art. The intro of the track, featured on the mixtape and Azalea's original self-released video version, contains a dialogue between Eddie Murphy and Grace Jones from their 1992 romantic comedy film Boomerang.

In October 2011, Chordz 3D, a member of D.R.U.G.S., said of the song: "I knew Iggy was a star from the moment I met her. When we did 'Pu$$y', I knew we were on to something, and it would be just a matter of time before the world see's [sic] what I saw. I’m grateful that the response has been positive so far." Azalea talked about the attention received by the release: "I definitely have a plan but I didn't contrive to put out 'Pu$$y' and think that people would super hate it, or that it would open up these doors, because it's so out of the box that I just didn't think that it'd really go like that. I definitely have a master-plan that I'm trying to accomplish, which by the way has nothing to do with vaginas." Explaining the concept behind it, Azalea added, "The song is pretty forward but I don't really relate what I say to my personal life ... I'm talking about that just because I, personally as a female, think that it's so ridiculous that there's this double standard where I can't say that, or if I do say it it's this or that," she reflected, "I said it because of that, and not because I'm super kinky and want everybody to know about my great vagina."

The song originated from her remix of Gucci Mane's 2011 song "Gucci Two Times." Azalea explained, "I really liked the song, but it was a remix thing. I wanted to make like a part two, I wanted to do it again, bigger and better, have a real video and so that's why I decided to do that, it was kind of an ongoing experiment." She elaborated in an earlier interview saying, "The song 'Pu$$y' comes from the Gucci Mane 'Two Times' remix that I did on my YouTube page and that was kind of just a joke we would say in the studio ... and I was like 'Someone should put that as a line on their song', and no one would ever do it," leading her to create her own version entitled "Pussy Two Times". "It's so funny to me because that song wasn't even about vaginas, it just happened to get on my crotch, but it's actually saying 'you're all pussies' ... I just did it [the video] because people obviously like vaginas, so I'll do it there but it's so weird to me to see the part two actually be about 'pussy'."

During an interview in early 2012, Azalea also talked about the perception people had of her sexually charged imagery, "So much of what I do that’s controversial in America wouldn't be a big deal back home. America is a highly sexualized society but people are afraid to admit what they like. When people tell me that I have to be sexy that’s demeaning, not powerful. To a lot of people, a powerful, sexy woman is vulgar. When I first came out people said, she only raps about her vagina. I'm not a vagina rapper! [Laughs.] I talk about many other things. The video [for 'Pu$$y'] could’ve been way more sexual. I held back because I didn’t think people could handle it. [Laughs.]" Talking about her upcoming debut album, she pointed out, "For me, the type of topics that I really like to address in my music are ones that are relevant to women – love and breakup or, I have songs like 'Pu$$y', which is like surface level stuff but really it's just kind of wanting to feel powerful as a woman."

== Critical reception ==
Matt Jost of RapReviews.com commented that "while there's a lot to be analyzed in that clip, the song 'Pu$$y' is a straight up rap tune, from the opening snippet of Grace Jones in Boomerang to a rapper talking about her private parts." HipHopDX noted "the mere title of the song is enough to catch anyone's interest, and catty content to match" and "as the musical approach sorts itself out, Iggy has steadily provided raw power, mixed with a bit of 'I don't give a fuck.'" In 2015, NME named "Pu$$y" one of Azalea's ten best songs, writing that it is "the crux of her problematic pop allure."

== Music video ==
The "Pu$$y" music video was shot in the territory of street gang Rollin 60s in Los Angeles, California, and features Azalea and her friends suggestively slurping ice creams. It was controversial for the prominent casting of a young boy while Azalea raps about her sexual prowess. After the release, she explained he's the son of a friend who was also in the video and couldn't find a babysitter, bringing him along to the set.

"I felt guilty afterwards, because it was a natural thing. I didn't plan, it wasn't contrived for me to put children in the video," she said. "The kid's mom is in the video, and she came to set – I asked her to come, everybody in the video is my friend or family in real life – and she was like 'I can't get a babysitter for [him]' and I said 'Bring [him], because he's like my little play cousin, I love that kid!'" she continued, "and so he came, and you know how kids are, they don't realize what's going on around them and he kept jumping in the video, he always wants piggybacks ... and they're like 'just leave him in the shot' and he totally swagged it ... he stayed, they picked the shots he was in. There was actually a lot of shots without [him] because [he] wasn't supposed to be in it and so when it came out like that I was like 'you know what, fuck it!'"

Azalea uploaded the video without permission from the producers in August 2011, forcing it off YouTube temporarily. Azalea's version of the video is introduced by the rapper and a friend in a nocturne rooftop setting, where she expresses frustration over having already filmed it "seven weeks ago," concluding, "So I asked myself 'what would Tupac do?' – leak the video." The ending also uses clips from another viral YouTube video called "Kittens inspired by kittens" where a little girl voices over pages from a book about cats. "Pu$$y" was directed by Falkon and produced by Blk Bart. Their final version of the video was released later in 2011 with additional post-production and does not include the intro of Azalea and her friend, the Boomerang dialogue in the opening scene nor the "Kittens inspired by kittens" sample.

During an interview at 102.7 KIIS FM in August 2013, while talking about her creative control, Azalea revealed the video was based on the 1995 American film Friday, "[That movie] made me do 'Pu$$y.' ... The ice cream truck, the cereal, all that ... just being on the porch, just the fact that Friday kind of happened just on a neighborhood, and I wanted to do with that video something that is interesting but nothing really happens, and you're at the front of a house and what could go on as you pass by, and that was from Friday."
