= Great Escape Tour =

2015 concert tour by Iggy Azalea

- Continental tour by Iggy Azalea
- Promotional poster for the tour
- Location: North America
- Associated album: The New Classic; Reclassified
- Start date: 18 September 2015
- End date: 27 October 2015
- No. of shows: 21

Iggy Azalea concert chronology
- The New Classic Tour (2014); Great Escape Tour (2015; cancelled); Bad Girls Tour (2018; cancelled)

The Great Escape Tour is the cancelled headlining concert tour by Australian rapper Iggy Azalea in support of her debut album, The New Classic (2014), its reissue, Reclassified (2014) and then-upcoming second studio album. The tour was scheduled to visit twenty-one cities across North America over the span of two months, beginning on 18 September 2015 in San Diego, California and concluding on 27 October 2015 in Glendale, Arizona. It was announced on 29 May 2015 that the entire tour was cancelled due to low sales, with a new tour to be announced with her then-upcoming, later cancelled album in 2016. It was the first of Azalea's tours to be cancelled, with her 2018 Bad Girls Tour also later cancelled.

== Background ==
On 10 December 2014, when reflecting on the year she has had and the struggles she faced in the years before, Azalea announced plans of an arena tour and a second studio album via her Twitter account. The same day, Azalea revealed the title of the tour and the concept behind it, which is Azalea picturing herself as "a musical escape artist for people." Azalea also revealed that the name of the tour goes along with the title of her upcoming second studio album, which will also be promoted on the tour.

On 15 December 2014, the North American leg of the tour was officially announced. Presented by AEG, the first leg of tour, which was set to commence on 14 April 2015 in Fresno, California, and was scheduled to visit twenty-four cities across North America during the spring of 2015 before ending on 24 May 2015 in Austin, Texas. Also revealed in the North American leg announcement was that Nick Jonas and Tinashe would be the special guests supporting Azalea on the first leg of the tour promoting their latest individual efforts, Nick Jonas (2014) and Aquarius (2014). Azalea's disc jockey, DJ Wizz Kidd, would also support Azalea throughout the tour.

Beginning on 15 December 2014, pre-sale tickets were available to all American Express cardholders through 18 December 2014. The public on-sale followed immediately after with tickets becoming available on 19 December 2014. Platinum and VIP Packages also became available for purchase on AEG's website, in which the packages included premium seating and exclusive autographed merchandise.

In an interview with GQ, Azalea began to reveal details about the tour's stage, visuals, and concept. When speaking about her main focus of the tour, Azalea stated "I want everything to be right—everything, from the tour book to what someone wears. Even the right faces for the dancers, and their attitude. Everything is equally important." While discussing stage layout, Azalea revealed that she's "trying to work on the initial stage design" and that she's "making a stage that [she can] engage with many people in an arena that big." She also noted that she was working with Jamie King, who has also worked with Madonna on her Confessions Tour (2006), which Azalea has stated is a major influence for the tour. Other influences for the tour that she's mentioned include the films Xanadu (1980) and Fantasia (1940). In regards to the visuals, Azalea has stated that the tour will include "color blocking—loud, just obnoxious-type visual things", that she also characterized as "Trippy, cool, [and] colorful." Azalea also commented on the nature of the show by saying "The traditional hip-hop arena show is more focused on a DJ. I don't think it has as many props and spectacles as perhaps a pop show, which is also what I would say my show is visually like." Overall, Azalea has stated her desire for the show is "not to be too wacky" and to be "a great experience [in which fans feel] really immersed in the whole thing."

"The whole point was to make no compromises, but nothing's changed in terms of my creative vision," Azalea told the Associated Press on 18 March 2015, backstage at a show for Samsung Galaxy during SXSW. "It's very kind of like Patrick Nagel, powerful 80s androgynous women vibe." Azalea admitted not wanting to wait until September to launch the tour, "but because the arenas are so far in advanced booked, it was kind of their next slot." She also mentioned taking advantage of the free time to finish recording her second album, "I didn't anticipate having any time to completely finish it, but now that I have kind of the time, I'd love to have an album at the end of 2015."

On 29 March 2015, Azalea told Billboard at the iHeartRadio Music Awards, the tour was now under the creative guidance of a new production designer, Baz Halpin, who'd been seasoning the show with a post-apocalyptic vibe, "It's going to be maybe a bit like Blade Runner, full of dark and '80s ridiculous fare but not in a cliché way," also revealing she had parted ways with former tour producer AEG Live over creative differences earlier that month. "It's been great working with a new person who really understands my vision," Azalea said of Halpin, who had also fashioned the set for her performance of "Trouble" with Jennifer Hudson both at the iHeartRadio Awards and Nickelodeon Kids' Choice Awards on the previous day. "It's taken some of the workload off me that he's able to understand what I'm trying to achieve instead of battling it, or it being lost in translation," Azalea continued. "Some things just work. With Baz, I really don't have to say it; he's thinking what I'm thinking, and it's great. I'm super-excited about the tour," she said.

== Rescheduling and cancellation ==
On 10 March 2015, it was announced the tour was being rescheduled "due to tour production delays", according to a statement from Def Jam Recordings. After reports surfaced that the tour was to be cancelled due to lack of promotion and conflict between her and management, Def Jam announced the decision "to accommodate for creative team availability and tour productions, it was determined that the tour will not be ready this spring." They continued, "It's important to Iggy that she delivers the show she envisaged to share with her fans and that requires more time in development." The spring tour was rescheduled to the fall, kicking off on September 18 in San Diego, California. A rep for Azalea also added that "there's no truth to the rumor that there's any conflict between her and her management." The press release issued by AEG Live also noted tickets for dates on the tour would be valid for the new dates in the fall, with the exception of the Baltimore, Las Vegas and Sacramento shows being canceled altogether, also indicating that the opening acts for the spring tour, Nick Jonas and Tinashe, would be replaced. Shortly after the announcement, a message was also posted from Azalea's official Twitter account: "The tour getting pushed back only means that it'll be way more amazing than it would've been in April. Good things take time."

On 29 May 2015, it was announced that the entire tour had been cancelled, with ticket holders receiving an email that stated "The Iggy Azalea Great Escape Tour scheduled for this fall has been cancelled and refunds are available at point of purchase. There will be a new tour planned around Iggy's new record to be released in 2016 and we apologize for any inconvenience." Azalea stated, "I'm sad and sorry to let my fans down," confirming plans to "be back on the road when the next album is done." She later issued a statement clarifying the cancellation saying she "had a different creative change of heart," in addition to being unable to find new opening acts available for the new dates she thought that would be a good fit for the tour and announcing she would also be taking a break to figure out the progression she wanted for her sound and visuals.

The tour promoter, AEG Live's senior VP Debra Rathwell, stated they never put its full marketing support behind the tour, explaining, "As we were not able to fill the support slots on the tour in the fall, due to so many artists already having commitments and working this summer, we had not advertised or promoted the new shows since last winter." She added, "The dates were selling well and were going to do fine,” standing by Azalea's creative decision to take a break and not exploring a move to smaller venues by clarifying, "there was no reason to do so. AEG LIVE is committed to her and will be working with her on her new tour." Azalea's booking agency, CAA, also issued a statement, "The lines of communication between Iggy, myself, and her [Turn First] managers Sarah [Stennett] and Nadia [Khan] have always been open. Iggy is an incredibly talented and creative artist with a clear vision, which she continuously shares with myself and her management team."

== Commercial performance ==
After the tickets for the tour became available to the public for purchase on 19 December 2014, Forbes reported positive news for ticket sales on the primary and secondary markets. On 7 January 2015, a list compiled by TiqIQ revealed that tickets for Azalea's tour were ranked fourteenth for most expensive concert tickets of the year as of that month. On the secondary market, the average ticket price for Azalea's tour totals in about $167, therefore making the tickets some of the most expensive tickets available on the secondary market. Ticket prices for the tour managed to top artists such as the Foo Fighters, but paled in comparison to artists such as Fleetwood Mac, Maroon 5, and Taylor Swift.

== Scheduled tour dates ==
Date	City	Country	Venue
North America
18 September 2015	San Diego	United States	Valley View Casino Center
20 September 2015	Fresno	United States	Save Mart Center
24 September 2015	Oakland	United States	Oracle Arena
25 September 2015	Los Angeles	United States	Staples Center
29 September 2015	Denver	United States	Pepsi Center
1 October 2015	Minneapolis	United States	Target Center
2 October 2015	Rosemont	United States	Allstate Arena
3 October 2015	Auburn Hills	United States	The Palace of Auburn Hills
5 October 2015	Washington, D.C.	United States	Verizon Center
6 October 2015	Boston	United States	TD Garden
8 October 2015	Toronto	Canada	Air Canada Centre
10 October 2015	Philadelphia	United States	Wells Fargo Center
11 October 2015	Brooklyn	United States	Barclays Center
12 October 2015	Newark	United States	Prudential Center
15 October 2015	Atlanta	United States	Philips Arena
17 October 2015	Miami	United States	American Airlines Arena
18 October 2015	Orlando	United States	Amway Center
22 October 2015	Houston	United States	Toyota Center
23 October 2015	Austin	United States	Frank Erwin Center
25 October 2015	Dallas	United States	American Airlines Center
27 October 2015	Glendale	United States	Gila River Arena
