= Ignorant Art =

Mixtape by Iggy Azalea
- Released: September 27, 2011
- Genres: Hip hop, electronic
- Length: 26:42
- Label: Self-released

Iggy Azalea chronology
Ignorant Art (2011)	Glory (2012)

Ignorant Art is the debut mixtape by Australian rapper Iggy Azalea, who released it as a free digital download on 27 September 2011, and is widely recognized as the work that launched her music career. The mixtape includes production by Los Angeles–based production team D.R.U.G.S., with their member Chordz 3D having executive produced the project, along with Azalea and Stix as co-executive producers, as noted on the mixtape's back cover credits. It also features guest appearances from YG, Problem, Joe Moses and Chevy Jones.

== Background and release ==
Ignorant Art is Iggy Azalea's debut music release and the project generally credited as Azalea's career breakthrough. The strength of the release contributed to XXL's decision to list Azalea amongst the magazine's 2012 Freshmen list, the magazine stating that Azalea is "the first female MC to grace the cover on the strength of her track "Pu$$y" and breakthrough mixtape Ignorant Art". XXL's decision proved controversial, particularly with rapper Azealia Banks who started a public feud with Azalea. The mixtape is further credited for giving Azalea enough exposure to convince rapper T.I. to sign her to his Grand Hustle label. Prior to the release of the mixtape, Azalea had shared several home videos on her YouTube channel as an underground rapper, including remixes of Gucci Mane's "Gucci Two Times," and Kendrick Lamar's "Look Out for Detox," as her "Pussy Two Times" and "Look Out for D.R.U.G.S." versions, respectively. Her "Two Times" remix originated a part two that was included on this mixtape and used as the first promotional track, "Pu$$y." During an interview at 102.7 KIIS FM in August 2013, Azalea revealed the title of her first mixtape was originally going to be called "Coming to America," named after the 1988 comedy film of the same name.

The MOBO Awards, who nominated Azalea for Best International Act in their 2013 award ceremony, stated that "Ignorant Art was a superb introduction to the amazing talents of Iggy Azalea. It felt more like a mini-album and she delivered as she promised she would." MOBO called the mixtape an instant "cult classic", and MTV agreed, stating that Azalea "made waves" with the release. On signing to Mercury Records in the UK in early 2013, the label's president stated that "Ignorant Art catapulted her into the limelight in 2011," adding that Azalea is "incredibly exciting and forward-thinking" as well as "utterly unique."

Ignorant Art was released as a free digital download on 27 September 2011. In December 2011, Azalea shared an a cappella version of the project for DJs and remixers. Azalea also released accompanying visuals for three tracks of the mixtape, including "Pu$$y," which was first uploaded on her YouTube channel in the Summer of 2011. "My World," directed by Alex/2tone, was released in November 2011, and featured a cameo appearance from character actor and former wrestler Tiny Lister, which earned her more attention due to its rising popularity online. "It's supposed to have like, all the ridiculousness of a big-budget '90s video, but then chopped and screwed," said Azalea, of the video. In January 2012, a 40's glam/surrealistic inspired-music video for "The Last Song," directed by Bell Soto, premiered online. Soto said the video "was very inspired on Surrealism and the old school process of Photography (red darkroom, contact sheets, 4×5 cameras). But we did not go vintage, we kept everything very polished and modern."

== Concept ==
Azalea has claimed on numerous occasions that the title of Ignorant Art is a direct reference to Jean-Michel Basquiat. Azalea stated: "I like how the stuff he did was crude and wasn't super polished, I wanted to do my music like that too." She says that the title is a direct quote from Basquiat, who, on meeting Andy Warhol, asked Warhol if he would like "to buy some ignorant art." Azalea claims that Basquiat felt misunderstood and disliked being labelled a "black artist", mirroring Azalea's own feelings, with her stating "I identify with that because people are always like, 'You're a white rapper.' I'm like, 'Why do I have to be that? Why can't I just be a rapper?" She further explains that she "made Ignorant Art with the intent to make people question and redefine old ideals." The cover of the mixtape is a further reference to the Warhol/Basquiat connection, being a remake of a poster the two artists made for a 1985 art exhibition in New York.

Azalea also addresses perceptions in hip hop about "what makes rap art or not", stating "I'd hear people in rap talk about what "real" rap is ... I wanted to change that so on that tape I used a lot of samples and made my own version of a rap record. I wanted it to be purposely ignorant." Elsewhere, Azalea states "If I tell a story, then that's real rap, but if I talk about vaginas, then that's not art anymore. What is real rap? What is art?"

Despite referencing Basquiat's "crude" approach, Ignorant Art was followed by more commercial works, Azalea allegedly having "decided to ease off her raunchy style and capture a more mainstream audience."

== Recording and production ==
Ignorant Art was recorded in Los Angeles, California, where Azalea was residing since 2010 after migrating from Australia to Miami in prior years. It was produced by D.R.U.G.S., an acronym that stands for Directing Reality Undermining Governed Systems, to which Azalea and Problem, who is also featured on the track "Drop That," were members, along with the executive producer of the mixtape Chordz 3D, and being described as "a group of artists, producers and musicians from all over. We've come together to save the world from mediocrity." The intro track, "Dirt in your Pussy Ass B!tch", consists of a skit on which a male voice loftily recites a poem about "young girls dropping their panties in hotel rooms, ignoring calls from their moms", Azalea explained, "It's a parody of Kanye West's song "Blame Game"," which famously ends with a serious verse by a woman called Chloe Mitchell. "She's my friend, and we thought: let's get together and write a poem that is the most ignorant shit ever but is actually really well-written. We wanted to see what's rap and what's not," she said.

Azalea replaces her speaking Australian accent by a southern drawl throughout the project. When she first moved to America, Azalea was involved in the Southern hip hop scene of Miami and later Atlanta, which made it easy for her to cultivate the Southern influence in her music: "I lived in the South for five years; you pick up things from your surroundings and teachers. The people who taught me to rap are all from the South and so was the music I had listened to as a teen."

During an interview with Complex a few months after the release of the mixtape, Azalea talked about the perception people had of her sexually charged imagery, "So much of what I do that's controversial in America wouldn't be a big deal back home. America is a highly sexualized society but people are afraid to admit what they like. When people tell me that I have to be sexy that's demeaning, not powerful...to a lot of people, a powerful, sexy woman is vulgar. When I first came out people said, 'She only raps about her vagina.' I'm not a vagina rapper! [Laughs]. I talk about many other things."

== Critical reception ==
The Los Angeles Times wrote about Azalea's "flow" on Ignorant Art, calling it "brash" and "aggressive," whilst Complex stated you should "let Ms. Azalea's machine gun flow win you over. Yup, she's that nice." MTV Base wrote that "the 2011 mixtape ... was the kind of impressive, raw statement one expects from an unknown with no pressure on her." Rap Reads gave it four and a half out of five stars, saying "Iggy chose eccentric, eclectic, intriguing production to rhyme over. The unique soundscapes that she chose do nothing but accentuate her very unique style," concluding it's "a very clean, concise listen."

The Guardian called the mixtape "forward thinking" whilst HNHH noted that "Azalea's musical situation is improving with every new release, and Ignorant Art will most definitely help the cause." RapReviews.com were more sceptical, stating in their review of the mixtape that "'ignorant' probably isn't the right word. But neither is 'intelligent'." In a chart of Azalea's best songs published in 2015, the NME rated "Pu$$y" at number ten, writing that "her debut mixtape's title, Ignorant Art, seemed amusingly perceptive to haters ... and 'Pu$$y' ... is the crux of her problematic pop allure."

== Track listing ==
Note: No detailed credits and personnel were ever officially published for the project.

Official YouTube playlist.

No.	Title	Length
1.	"Dirt In Your P***y Ass B!tch (Intro)"	1:17
2.	"Hello" (featuring Joe Moses)	3:49
3.	"My World"	3:19
4.	"Pu$$y"	2:43
5.	"You" (featuring YG)	2:51
6.	"Backseat" (featuring Chevy Jones)	3:00
7.	"Treasure Island"	3:18
8.	"Drop That Shit" (featuring Problem)	3:09
9.	"The Last Song"	3:16
Total length:		26:42

Sample credits

Information adapted from WhoSampled.

- "My World" contains a sample of "Astronomia" performed by Tony Igy.
- "You" contains a sample of "Crash Into Me" performed by Dave Matthews Band.
- "Backseat" contains samples of "Last Night" performed by Niki & The Dove and "Backseat" performed by STAYGOLD featuring Spank Rock, Damian Adore, and Lady Tigra.
- "Treasure Island" contains a sample of "Waste" performed by Foster The People.
