= The New Classic Tour =

2014 concert tour by Iggy Azalea

- Tour by Iggy Azalea
- Promotional poster for the tour
- Location: North America; Europe
- Associated album: The New Classic
- Start date: 23 April 2014
- End date: 24 October 2014
- Legs: 3
- No. of shows: 48 in North America; 5 in Europe; 53 in total

Iggy Azalea concert chronology
- The New Classic Tour (2014); The Great Escape Tour (2015; cancelled)

The New Classic Tour is the debut and only concert tour by Australian rapper Iggy Azalea. The tour promoted her debut studio album, The New Classic (2014). Beginning April 2014, the tour played 15 concerts in North America, with plans to perform at various music festivals in Europe during the summer.

== Background ==
Initially, Azalea was set to tour and release her album in September 2013. During an interview with Billboard, Azalea stated she was working on stage and costume design. However, an invitation to open shows (in Asia and Australia) for American recording artist, Beyoncé on her 2013 tour, delayed both projects. Shortly after the release of her fourth single, tour details were finalized.

The tour is sponsored by Monster Energy and promoted by Live Nation. Monster Energy is teaming up with consulting firm, Idol Roc Entertainment, to present the "Monster Energy Hip Hop Outbreak"; a music event to help promote emerging performers in the hip-hop industry. Thus, the tour is officially known as the Monster Energy Outbreak Tour presents: Iggy Azalea—The New Classic Tour.

== Set list ==
The following set list is representative of the show on 19 October 2014. It is not representative of all concerts for the duration of the tour.

1. "Beat Down"
2. "Fuck Love"
3. "Bounce"
4. "My World"
5. "Rolex"
6. "Don't Need Y'all"
7. "Change Your Life"
8. "Lady Patra"
9. "Pussy"
10. "Murda Bizness"
11. "Drop That Shit"
12. "Fancy"
13. "Flexin’ & Finessin’"
14. "Quicktime"
15. "Black Widow"
16. "Work"

== Shows ==
Date	City	Country	Venue	Festival / Concert
North America
23 April 2014	Boston	United States	House of Blues	—N/a
24 April 2014	Montreal	Canada	Théâtre Corona Virgin Mobile	—N/a
25 April 2014	Toronto	Canada	Danforth Music Hall	—N/a
26 April 2014	Detroit	United States	Saint Andrew's Hall	—N/a
27 April 2014	Chicago	United States	House of Blues	—N/a
2 May 2014	Silver Spring	United States	The Fillmore Silver Spring	—N/a
3 May 2014	Philadelphia	United States	Theatre of Living Arts	—N/a
4 May 2014	New York City	United States	Music Hall of Williamsburg	Steve Madden Music Summer Concert Series
5 May 2014	New York City	United States	Irving Plaza	—N/a
7 May 2014	Atlanta	United States	Center Stage Theater	—N/a
9 May 2014	Los Angeles	United States	Redbull Sound Space	Amp Radio Live
14 May 2014	Santa Ana	United States	The Observatory	—N/a
16 May 2014	Los Angeles	United States	Wiltern Theatre	—N/a
17 May 2014	Anaheim	United States	Honda Center	Powerhouse 2014
17 May 2014	San Diego	United States	House of Blues	—N/a
18 May 2014	San Francisco	United States	The Fillmore	—N/a
21 May 2014	Vancouver	Canada	Commodore Ballroom	—N/a
22 May 2014	Seattle	United States	Neptune Theatre	—N/a
24 May 2014	Las Vegas	United States	The Bank Nightclub	Power 106 Takeover
30 May 2014	Philadelphia	United States	Festival Pier at Penn's Landing	Wired Fest
1 June 2014	East Rutherford	United States	MetLife Stadium	Hot 97 Summer Jam
6 June 2014	Greenwood Village	United States	Fiddler's Green Amphitheatre	KS1075 Summer Jam XVII
14 June 2014	Bridgeview	United States	Toyota Park	B96 Pepsi SummerBash
15 June 2014	Foxborough	United States	Gillette Stadium	103.3 AMP Radio Birthday Bash
Europe
21 June 2014	London	England	Wembley Stadium	Summertime Ball
North America
27 June 2014	Miami	United States	Fontainebleau Miami Beach	iHeartRadio Ultimate Pool Party
Europe
4 July 2014	London	England	Finsbury Park	Wireless Festival
6 July 2014	Birmingham	England	Perry Park	Wireless Festival
11 July 2014	Frauenfeld	Switzerland	Openairgelände Festivalgelände	Openair Frauenfeld
North America
12 July 2014	Edmonton	Canada	Shaw Conference Centre	—N/a
26 July 2014	Las Vegas	United States	Boulevard Pool	—N/a
1 August 2014	Chicago	United States	Grant Park	Lollapalooza
2 August 2014	Toronto	Canada	Downsview Park	Veld Music Festival
6 August 2014	Columbus	United States	LC Pavilion	—N/a
15 August 2014	Montreal	Canada	Parc Jean-Drapeau	Île Soniq
30 August 2014	Los Angeles	United States	Grand Park	Budweiser Made in America Festival
12 September 2014	Rochester Hills	United States	Meadow Brook Theatre	—N/a
Europe
17 September 2014	London	England	Shepherd's Bush Empire	—N/a
North America
19 September 2014	Atlanta	United States	Piedmont Park	Music Midtown
20 September 2014	Las Vegas	United States	The Lot	iHeartRadio Music Festival
20 September 2014	Las Vegas	United States	MGM Grand Garden Arena	iHeartRadio Music Festival
25 September 2014	Baltimore	United States	Pier Six Pavilion	—N/a
26 September 2014	New York City	United States	Pier 97, Hudson River Park	—N/a
27 September 2014	Kingston	United States	Ryan Center	—N/a
28 September 2014	Mashantucket	United States	Grand Theater at Foxwoods	—N/a
3 October 2014	Houston	United States	Bayou Music Center	—N/a
4 October 2014	Austin	United States	Zilker Park	Austin City Limits Music Festival
8 October 2014	Santa Monica	United States	Barker Hangar	VevoCERTIFIED
9 October 2014	Nashville	United States	Memorial Gymnasium	Commodore Quake
11 October 2014	Austin	United States	Zilker Park	Austin City Limits
17 October 2014	Minneapolis	United States	TCF Bank Stadium	—N/a
18 October 2014	Normal	United States	Braden Auditorium	—N/a
19 October 2014	Milwaukee	United States	The Rave / Eagles Club	—N/a
24 October 2014	Los Angeles	United States	Hollywood Bowl	We Can Survive!

Cancellations and rescheduled shows

24 April 2014	Montreal, Canada	Théâtre Telus	Moved to the Théâtre Corona Virgin Mobile
