= Iggy Azalea =

Australian former rapper and songwriter (born 1990)

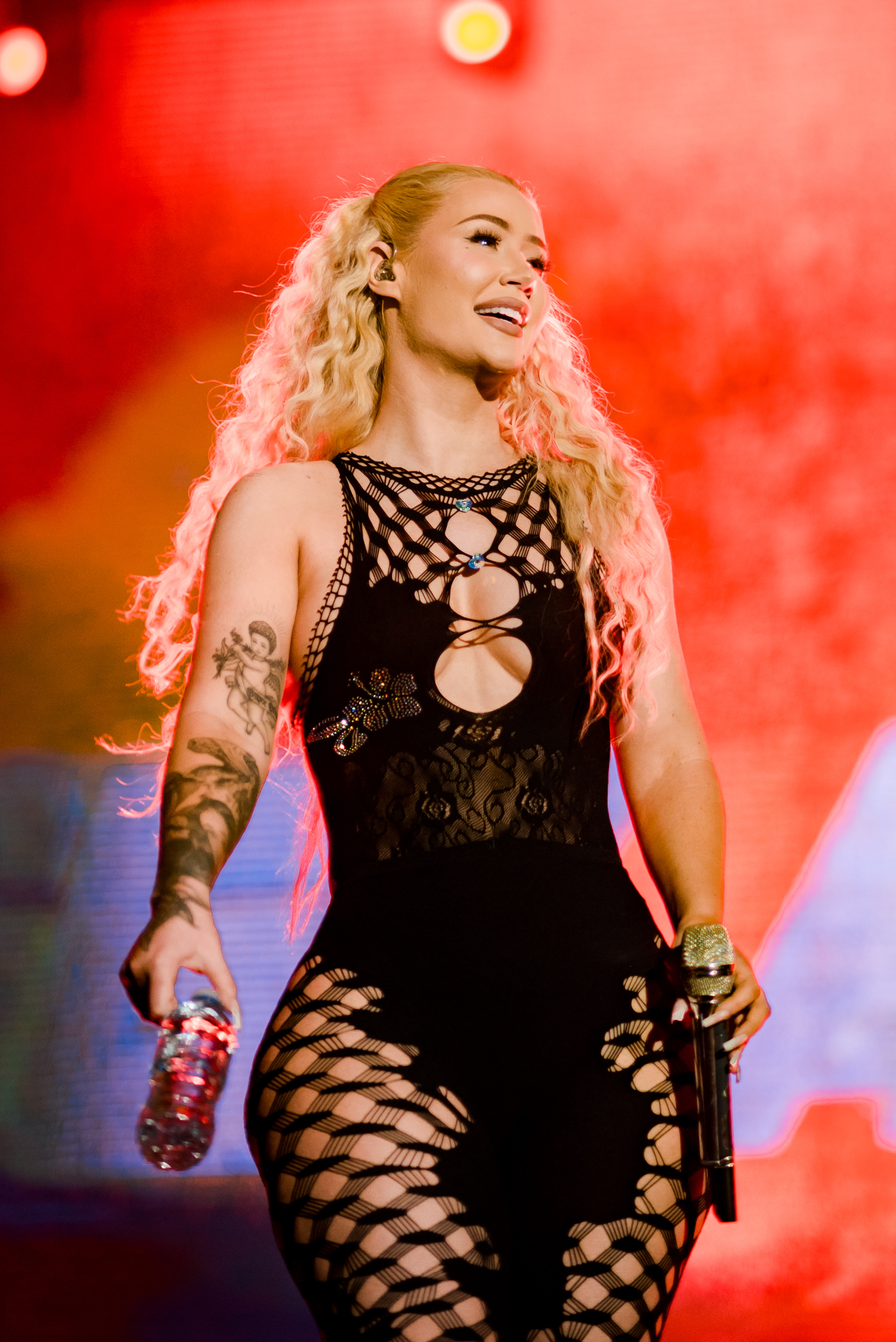
- Azalea performing at EXIT Festival in 2022
- Born: Amethyst Amelia Kelly; 7 June 1990 (age 36); Sydney, New South Wales, Australia
- Occupations: Rapper; songwriter; model; businesswoman
- Years active: 2011–2024
- Works: Discography; songs; videography
- Awards: Full list
- Musical career
- Genres: Australian hip-hop; pop-rap
- Labels: Bad Dreams; Empire; Island; Virgin EMI; Def Jam; Grand Hustle; Mercury
- Formerly of: Hustle Gang

Amethyst Amelia Kelly (born 7 June 1990), known professionally as Iggy Azalea (/əˈzeɪliə/ ə-ZAY-lee-ə), is an Australian model, businesswoman and former rapper. Born in Sydney, Azalea moved to the United States at age 16 to pursue a career in music. She gained recognition on YouTube with the music videos for her 2011 songs "Pussy" and "Two Times", before self-releasing her debut mixtape Ignorant Art (2011) and signing with American rapper T.I.'s Grand Hustle Records.

Azalea's debut studio album, The New Classic (2014), peaked within the top five of several charts worldwide and later topped the Billboard Top R&B/Hip-Hop Albums chart, making her the first non-American female rapper to achieve the feat. The album's lead single, "Fancy" (featuring Charli XCX), was a major commercial success, topping the U.S. Billboard Hot 100 and earning a nomination for Record of the Year at the 2015 Grammy Awards. Azalea also featured on Ariana Grande's 2014 single "Problem", which peaked at number two behind "Fancy", making her only the second act after the Beatles to hold the top two positions on the chart simultaneously with debut entries. A further single from the album, "Black Widow" (featuring Rita Ora), also reached the top ten.

Following her debut album, Azalea released several singles intended for a planned second album, Digital Distortion. However, ongoing conflicts with her record label, compounded by personal difficulties, led to the project's cancellation. She subsequently signed with Island Records, releasing her fourth extended play, Survive the Summer (2018). Further disputes with the label prompted Azalea to self-release her second studio album, In My Defense (2019), followed by the EP Wicked Lips (2019) and her third studio album, The End of an Era (2021). In 2024, Azalea announced her retirement from music via social media, as reported by Billboard.

Azalea is one of the best-selling female rappers in the world. Her accolades include two American Music Awards, three Billboard Music Awards, an MTV Video Music Award, a People's Choice Award and four Teen Choice Awards, as well as four Grammy Awards nominations. Her YouTube channel, together with collaborators, has accumulated over 7 billion views, and 15 of her music videos have surpassed 100 million views on Vevo.

== Early life ==
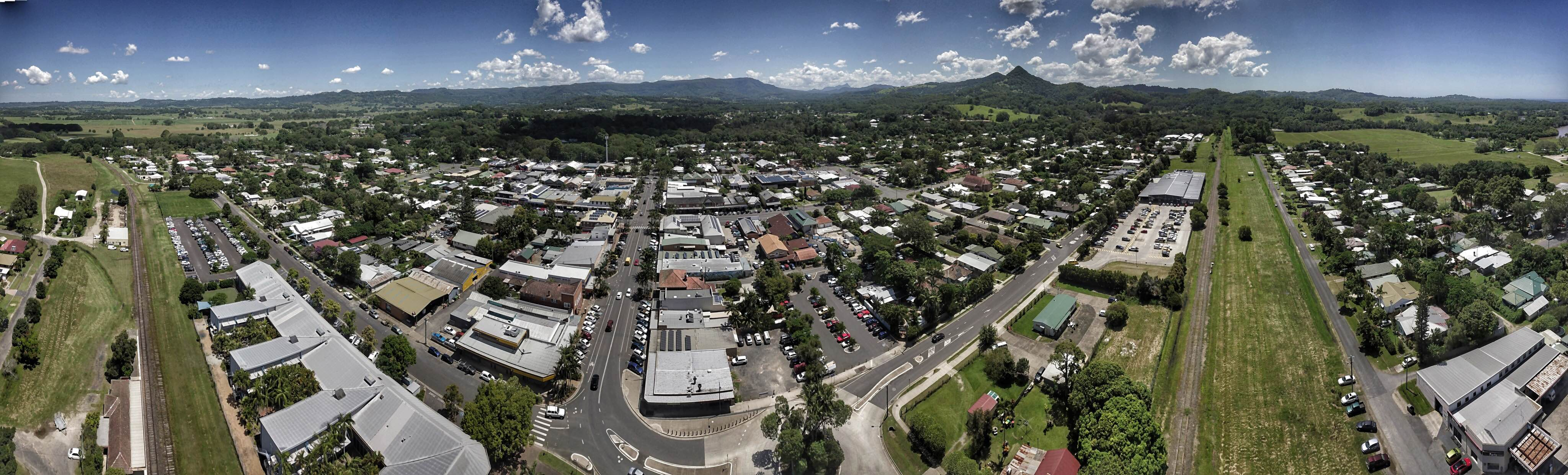
An aerial perspective of Mullumbimby, New South Wales, Australia, where Azalea grew up

Amethyst Amelia Kelly was born in Sydney and grew up in Mullumbimby. Her father, Brendan Kelly, was a painter and comic artist, while her mother, Tanya, cleaned holiday houses and hotels. Azalea lived in a house that her father built by hand from mud-bricks, surrounded by 5 hectares (12 acres) of land. She has two siblings named Mathias and Emerald Kelly. Azalea has also said that her father "made her look at [art] as a teenager", which has always influenced her life and work. She began rapping at age 14. Before embarking on a solo career, Azalea formed a group with two other girls from her neighborhood: "I was like, I could be the rapper. This could be like TLC. I'll be Left Eye." Azalea eventually decided to disband the group because the other girls were not taking it seriously: "I take everything I do serious [sic]. I'm too competitive."

In pursuit of her desire to move to America, Azalea dropped out of high school. She worked and saved the money she earned by cleaning hotel rooms and holiday houses with her mother. She claims to have hated school, which, apart from art class, only made her miserable. She also said she had no friends and was teased for her homemade outfits. Azalea traveled to the United States in 2006, shortly before she turned 16. She told her parents she was going "on a holiday" with a friend, but eventually decided to stay and shortly afterward told them she was not coming back home:

"I was drawn to America because I felt like an outsider in my own country, I was in love with hip hop, and America is the birthplace of that, so I figured the closer I was to the music, the happier I'd be. I was right."

She recalled, "My mum was crying, saying, 'Just be safe.' I was thinking, 'I'm going by myself. I'm fucking crazy!'" After she arrived in the US, she received her General Educational Development (GED), and resided in the country on a visa waiver for six years, returning to Australia every three months to renew it. Azalea worked in the US illegally until February 2013 when she was granted a five-year O visa. In 2018, Azalea was approved as a permanent U.S. resident.

== Career ==
=== 2006–2012: Early musical work ===
When she first arrived in the United States in 2006, she stayed in Miami, Florida, and afterward lived briefly in Houston, Texas. Azalea settled for a few years in Atlanta, Georgia, working with a member of the rap collective Dungeon Family named Backbone. During that period, she met future collaborators FKi 1st and Natalie Sims. She said people would laugh at her because "they thought my raps sucked", but having grown up getting laughed at, she was able to shrug it off. Meanwhile, she had met someone from Interscope Records who encouraged her move to Los Angeles during the summer of 2010. Interscope would eventually go on to manage her for a brief period of time. It was during this time that she adopted her stage name, which she created from the name of her childhood dog, Iggy, and the street she grew up on, Azalea Street, where her family still lives. Regarding her decision to combine the names to form her stage name, Azalea credited her grandfather, who reportedly worked in television. "He told me this theory, and it made perfect mathematical sense about syllables and stage names -- they have to have a certain amount of syllables and mine was wrong."

She also started making stop motion animated videos with freestyle rap because she felt like she had found her sound.

On 27 September 2011, Azalea released her first full-length project, a mixtape titled Ignorant Art, saying she made it "with the intent to make people question and redefine old ideals." Her song "Pussy" was included on the mixtape, alongside guest appearances from YG, Joe Moses, Chevy Jones, and Problem. In November 2011, she released a music video for her song "My World", directed by Alex/2tone. The video features a cameo appearance from character actor and former wrestler Tiny Lister, which earned her more attention due to its rising popularity online. "It's supposed to have like, all the ridiculousness of a big-budget '90s video, but then chopped and screwed", said Azalea, of the video. In December 2011, Azalea revealed she would release her debut studio album, The New Classic, as soon as she signed a major record label deal: "Once that's sorted out and I establish an overall sound and direction for the album, I will be able to know what artists would make for a dynamic collaboration." On 11 January 2012, Azalea released the music video for "The Last Song", her third video from Ignorant Art. In an interview with Billboard, released on 27 January, Azalea hinted at an Interscope Records signing, while also revealing hopes of releasing The New Classic in June, and for her debut single to precede it in March.

"I'm working with a different production company for my album than what I did for my mixtape Ignorant Art, and I don't know who yet. I'm still looking. T.I.'s gonna be helping me with it, kinda like A&Ring, kinda like executive-producing. He called me up and was like, 'Yo.' And I was like, 'Definitely. You're Tip. I love you, of course.' So he's gonna be kinda helping me out, like just kinda reaching out to people and helping me find production and pointing me in the direction of things that I might like. We're gonna start on that next week together. I'll probably fly out to Atlanta and we'll do it in between there because he's weird with traveling and stuff. I understand. We're in touch with each other. I have legal issues, he has legal issues. I get it. So hopefully that will be really dynamic and it'll help speed things along."

— Azalea speaking on her phone call and decision to work with T.I.

Azalea reached out to rapper T.I., for the direction of her debut album. T.I. was set to executive produce The New Classic, soon after a phone call the two had. At the time, Azalea was eyeing a summer release for The New Classic: "Hopefully if all goes to plan, my album will be out in June and I'll have it recorded by the end of the month." However, after Interscope did not allow T.I. to be an ongoing part of her deal, Azalea opted not to sign with the major label and stay independently signed to Grand Hustle Records, until the release of her first album, which had then been postponed. In early 2012, Azalea was featured on the cover of XXL, as part of its annual "Top 10 Freshman List", along with fellow up-and-coming rappers French Montana, Machine Gun Kelly, Danny Brown, Hopsin, and Roscoe Dash. On 1 March 2012, T.I. announced he signed Azalea to Grand Hustle Records, along with rappers Chip and Trae tha Truth. On 26 March 2012, Azalea posted "Murda Bizness", the intended lead single for The New Classic, on her YouTube account. The song was produced by Bei Maejor and features a verse from her Grand Hustle label-boss T.I.

In April 2012, via her Twitter feed, Azalea announced plans to release an extended play (EP) entitled Glory, later in May: "I'm just onto something right now, the last two weeks and it's glory. Azaleans need something new." Also in April, Azalea starred alongside Grammy-nominated producer Diplo and FKi in the world's first fully interactive shoppable music video for Canadian fashion retailer, SSENSE. In May 2012, it was confirmed by T.I. on MTV's HipHopPov that Azalea had not yet secured distribution for her deal with Grand Hustle Records, and was described by T.I. as a "free agent". It was later revealed in the interview that she was in negotiation with labels other than Interscope, possibly Def Jam Recordings (wherein Bu Thiam, whom of which originally placed a bid to sign her is VP of A&R). Azalea was also featured on Steve Aoki and Angger Dimas' collaborative electronic track "Beat Down", which was released on 31 May 2012.

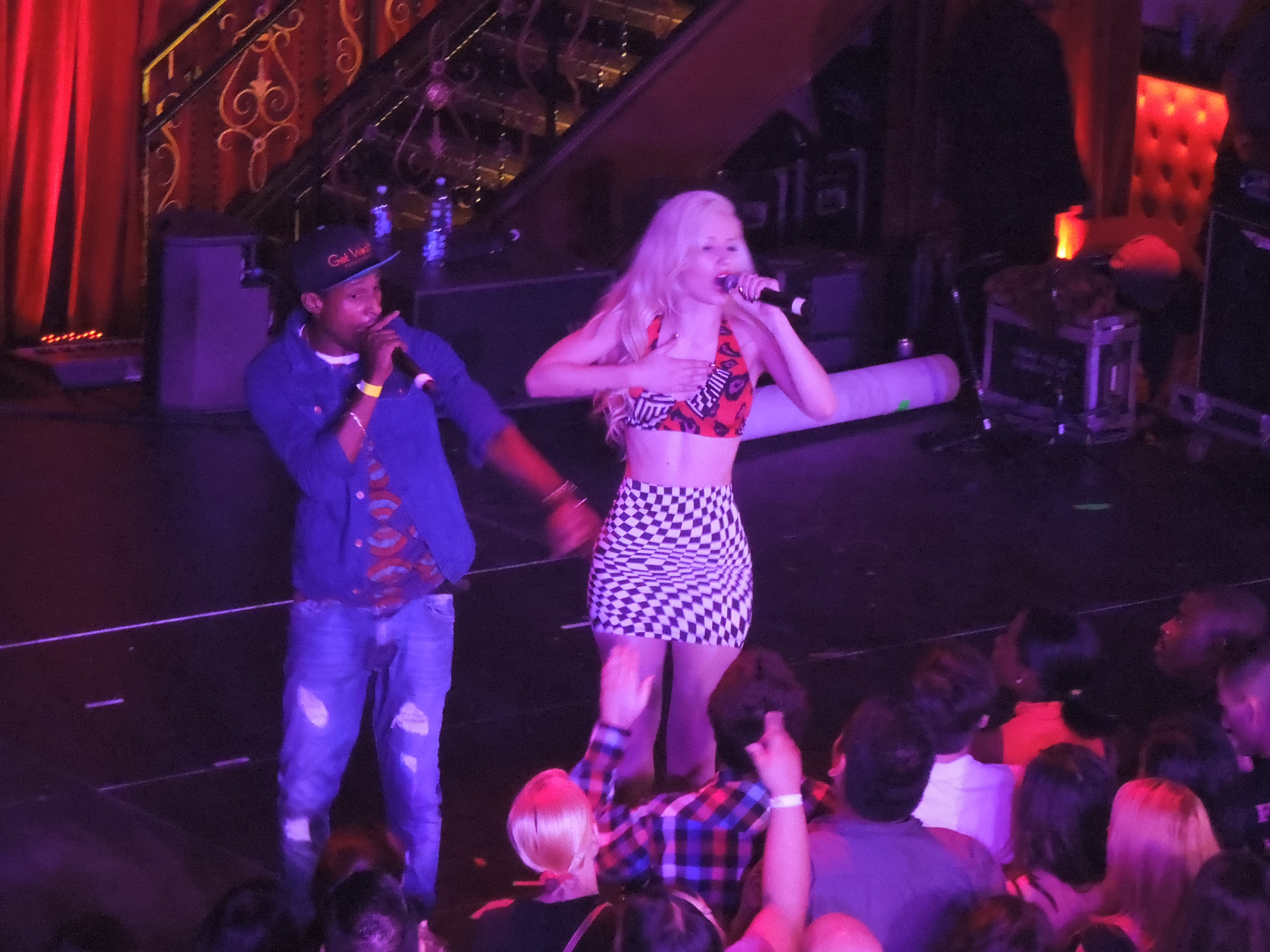
Azalea performing in 2012

On 24 June 2012, Azalea released "Millionaire Misfits", the second offering from her EP Glory; the first being "Murda Bizness". On 21 July, the official music video for "Murda Bizness" was released online. Glory, although not released in May, as it was originally scheduled, was released 30 July 2012. Azalea was also one of the acts on MTV's 2012 Closer to My Dreams Tour, along with Tyga and Kirko Bangz. On 28 September 2012, Azalea announced she would be releasing her second mixtape on 11 October 2012. Titling it TrapGold, the mixtape was produced entirely by Diplo and FKi. She later premiered teaser visuals for the track "Bac 2 Tha Future (My Time)", On 9 October 2012, Azalea made her US national television debut, appearing alongside T.I., B.o.B and other Grand Hustle artists in a cypher at the 2012 BET Hip Hop Awards. Later that month, she embarked on yet another North American mini-concert tour with Roc Nation singer-songwriter Rita Ora, on her Ora Tour. Azalea then headlined a tour in Europe to support TrapGold. On 16 December 2012, Azalea performed live alongside Natasha Bedingfield and Bootsy Collins, covering Deee-Lite's 1990 hit disco song "Groove Is in the Heart", on the annual television series VH1 Divas.

=== 2013–2014: Breakthrough and The New Classic ===
In January and February 2013, Azalea worked on tour while still working on her upcoming singles and summer release of The New Classic. She was the opening act for Rita Ora's Radioactive Tour, in the United Kingdom. As part of her set for Ora's Radioactive Tour, Azalea premiered her commercial debut single "Work", which also serves as the lead single for her debut album. The single premiered on BBC Radio 1Xtra on 11 February 2013. On 13 February 2013, it was announced Azalea had signed a record deal with Mercury Records. The music video for her debut single "Work", was directed by Jonas & François and released 13 March 2013. In March 2013, Azalea also joined renowned rapper Nas, on the European leg of his Life Is Good Tour. On 15 April 2013, Vevo announced Azalea as its second LIFT artist of 2013 and that she would film live festival performances, fashion and style pieces and behind-the-scenes interviews as part of the eight-week-long campaign. It was also revealed that the music video for her second single, "Bounce", would premiere on Vevo at the end of the month. On 16 March 2013, it was announced that Azalea would perform in the benefit concert "Chime for Change", scheduled to take place on 1 June in London, alongside Beyoncé, Jennifer Lopez and others. On 23 April 2013, Azalea announced that she had signed a solo record deal with Island Def Jam. On 26 April 2013, "Bounce" premiered on BBC Radio 1. She also noted that the third international single taken from her debut album would be entitled "Change Your Life" and feature a verse from T.I. Azalea also confirmed that she was not signed to Grand Hustle Records, although she was heavily affiliated with the label.

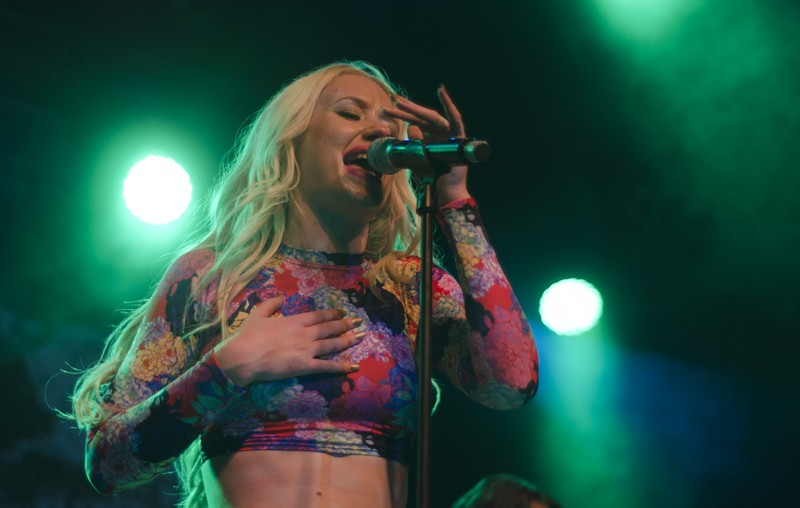
Azalea performing at Converse Get Dirty Festival in Austria, April 2013

On 25 May 2013, Azalea performed an acclaimed carnival themed set on the In New Music We Trust stage as part of Radio 1's Big Weekend in Derry, Northern Ireland. The setlist contained songs from previous EPs and album material such as "Bounce" and "Work". The show was the start of a short set of UK pre-album promotional appearances. In June 2013, Azalea confirmed that the album was nearly finished and that the release was expected in September 2013. On 29 July 2013, Azalea revealed she will be opening for Beyoncé on the 17-date Australia leg of her Mrs. Carter Show World Tour in October and November. The third single from The New Classic, titled "Change Your Life", was premiered by BBC Radio 1Xtra's MistaJam, on 19 August 2013. On 3 October 2013, Azalea made her first appearance on BET's 106 & Park, where she was interviewed and performed "Change Your Life", alongside T.I. Her debut album was slated for an October 2013 release, but in an interview with Australia's Herald Sun she revealed that due to other commitments such as supporting Beyoncé on her Mrs. Carter Show World Tour, her record label would not allow her to release The New Classic until March 2014. She said: "The official date? Fucked if I know! It's done, it's so depressing to say this but it's the beginning of March, it's so far away but I just have to accept that." She explained the reasons behind the delay: "It was supposed to be October but obviously I'm going on tour with Beyoncé and they said I'm not allowed to put an album out while I'm on tour because I'll be trapped in Australia and I won't be able to do any TV appearances and I thought that's fair enough, that's three weeks and then they said 'You can't put an album out around Christmas time, that's a bad time' and I said 'What about January?' 'Well nobody gets back off holidays and then it's the BRIT Awards, you can't release an album, it's terrible for marketing' which brings me to February."

On 10 November 2013, Azalea performed "Blurred Lines" with Robin Thicke at the 2013 MTV Europe Music Awards. On 5 December 2013, an unfinished song by Azalea titled "Leave It", allegedly produced by DJ Mustard, was leaked. Azalea later revealed the song was in fact produced by the Invisible Men and the Arcade, whom she collaborated with on the entire album. In February 2014, Azalea announced that she would be releasing a new single titled "Fancy", featuring English singer-songwriter Charli XCX. In a later interview, Azalea reflects on the fact that she had "no idea" how the collaboration with Charli XCX came about, only that the songwriters The Invisible Menthought "it would be a good idea and I found out later." The song was premiered on BBC Radio 1 Xtra at 7 pm GMT on 6 February 2014. After the song's premiere, it was revealed "Fancy" was the song that had leaked titled "Leave It". On 17 February 2014, the song was serviced to urban contemporary radio in the United Kingdom as the album's fourth single. The music video for "Fancy", inspired by the 1995 American comedy film Clueless was released on 4 March. "Fancy" went on to become Azalea's most successful single to date, becoming her first single to chart on the US Billboard Hot 100. It also reached number-one on Billboard's Hot Rap Songs chart, as well as number-one the US Dance Club Play chart. After much delay and speculation, The New Classic was finally released on 21 April 2014. Upon its release, the album debuted at number-three on the Billboard 200 chart, with first-week sales of 52,000 copies in the United States. The New Classic was the highest-charting female rap album since Nicki Minaj's Pink Friday: Roman Reloaded (2012). The New Classic also attained the highest number for a female rapper's debut album since Minaj's Pink Friday (2010), which had entered at number-two with 375,000 copies sold.

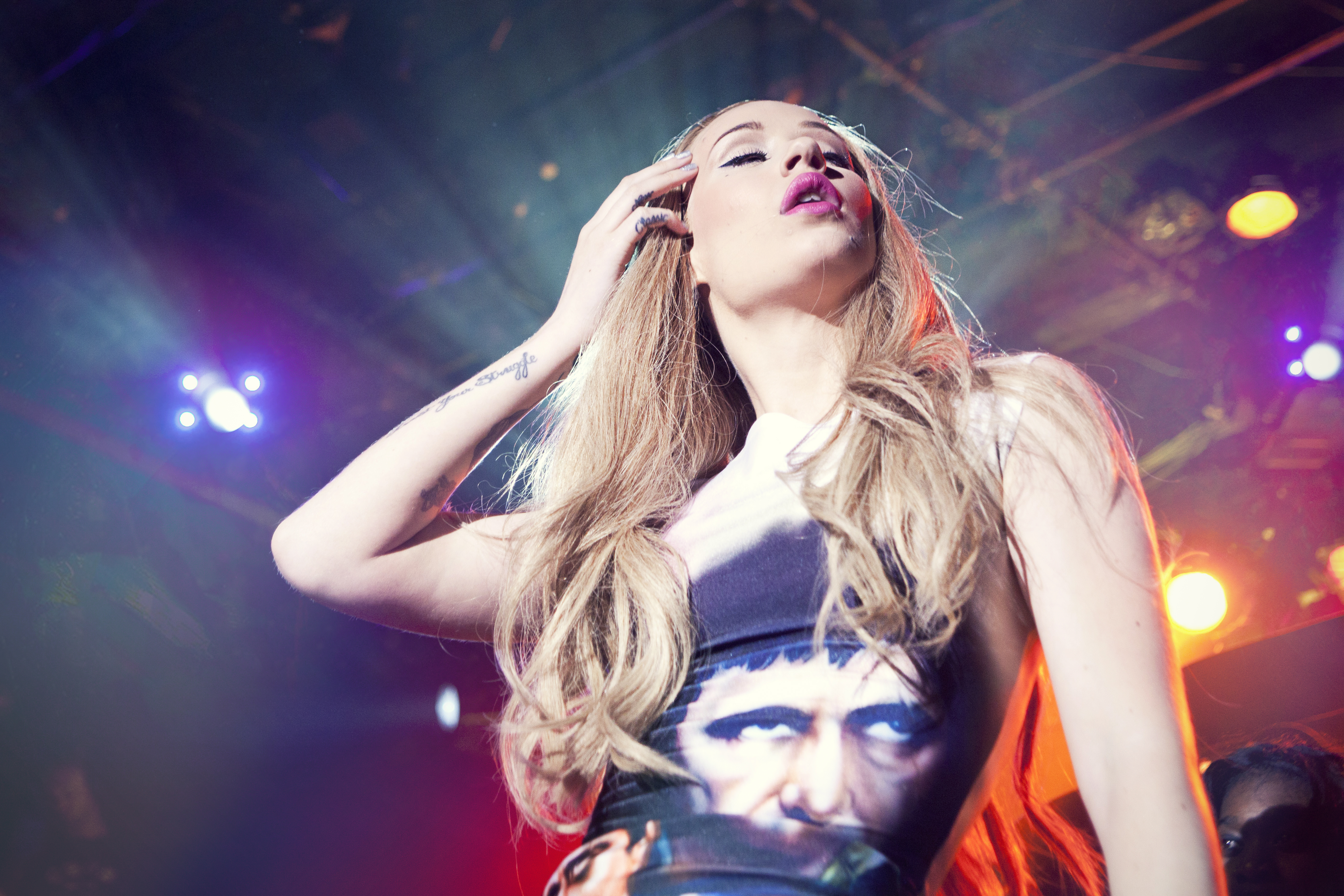
Azalea performing at Irving Plaza in New York City on her The New Classic Tour, May 2014

Azalea was next featured on American singer Ariana Grande's single "Problem", which was released on 28 April 2014. The song was released as the lead single from Grande's second studio album. On 28 May 2014, The New Classic's fourth single "Fancy", reached number-one on the US Billboard Hot 100 chart, with Azalea being the fourth solo female rapper ever to top the Hot 100. On the same day, "Problem" rose to number-two on the Hot 100, with Azalea becoming the only artist since the Beatles, to rank at numbers one and two simultaneously, with their first two respective Hot 100 entries. "Fancy" also topped the Billboard Hot R&B/Hip Hop Songs chart. On 24 June 2014, Azalea's song "Black Widow", featuring Rita Ora, was serviced to rhythmic contemporary radio, as her debut album's fifth single in the US. It eventually peaked at number three on the Billboard Hot 100. Shortly after, Azalea also appeared on Jennifer Lopez's single "Booty". The collaboration came after Azalea's feature on their song "Acting Like That" from Jennifer Lopez's A.K.A. album. The song was released on Lopez's YouTube channel on September 18, and quickly became one of the most viewed Youtube videos under 24 hours with more than 16 million views. A reissue of The New Classic, titled Reclassified, was released in November 2014; featuring five new songs, including new singles "Trouble" featuring her previous collaborator Jennifer Hudson and "Beg for It" featuring MØ. On October 25, 2014 Azalea made her debut on Saturday Night Live episode, hosted by Jim Carrey, where she performed "Black Widow" together with Rita Ora and "Beg for It" with MØ. The performance of "Beg for It" got mostly negative feedback due to MØ's execution of the chorus. Entertainment Tonight called it "one of the most cringe-worthy live moments in recent history," and highlighted that it was MØ's "nervous dancing and offbeat singing" that garnered the worst of the criticism.

On 10 December 2014, when reflecting on the year she'd had and the struggles she faced in the years before, Azalea announced plans of an arena tour for 2015 and a second studio album via her Twitter account. The same day, she revealed the title of the tour, The Great Escape Tour, and the concept behind it, which is Azalea picturing herself as "a musical escape artist for people". Azalea also stated that the name of the tour went along with the title of her upcoming second studio album, which would also be promoted on the tour.

=== 2015–2018: Career development and change of management ===
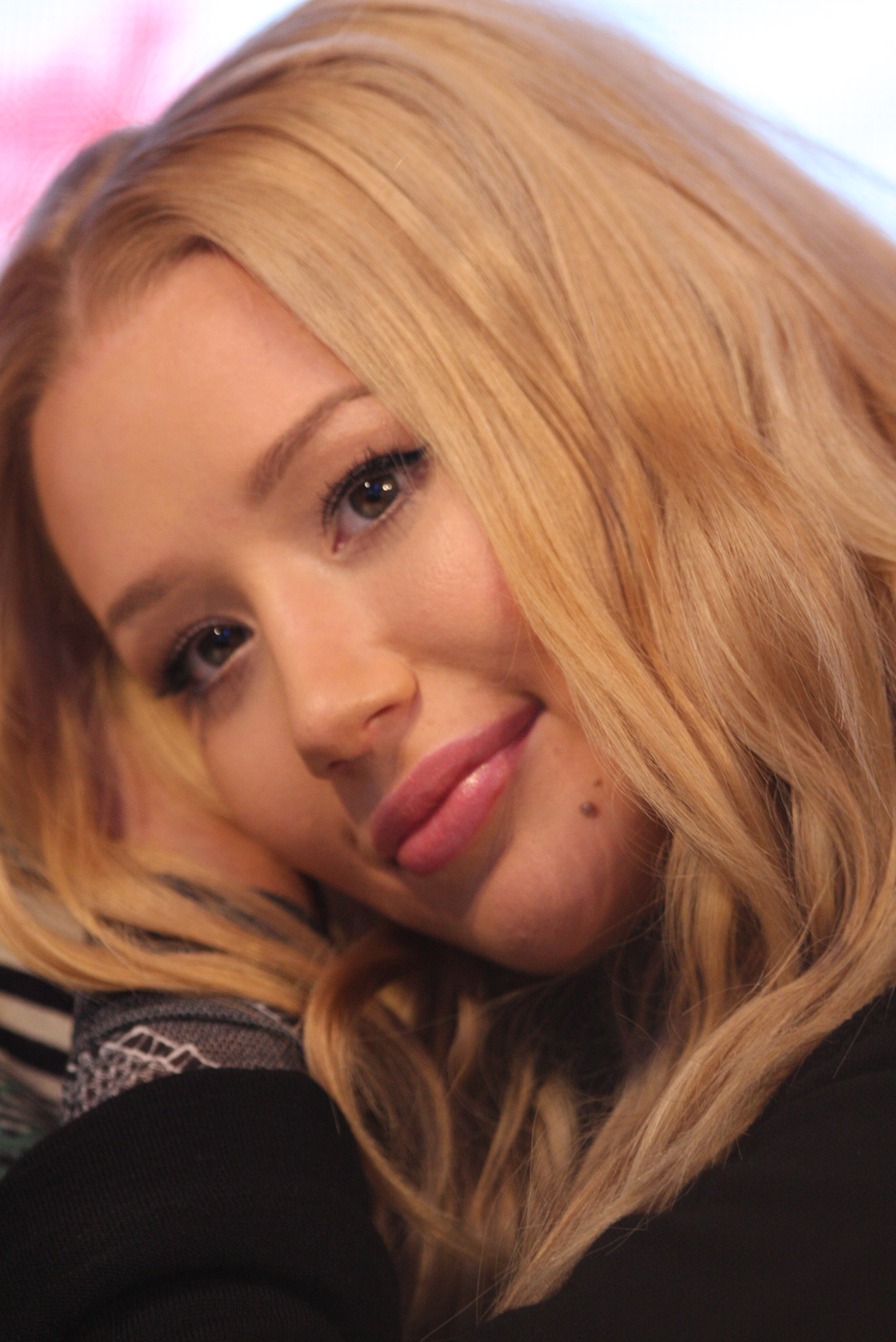
Azalea in Sydney, 2015

Azalea declared she had started to work on her second studio album in January 2015. She also closed the 41st People's Choice Awards with song "Beg for It", and where she won the award for Favorite Hip-Hop Artist. In April 2015, Azalea made her acting debut in blockbuster action film Furious 7 alongside Vin Diesel, Dwayne Johnson, Michelle Rodriguez and Paul Walker. She had a role of "Girl race driver" and also contributed in films soundtrack together with Wiz Khalifa for song "Go Hard or Go Home". On 4 May 2015, after months of speculations, she released a duet with Britney Spears titled "Pretty Girls". The song debuted and peaked at number 29 in the United States on the Billboard Hot 100. Azalea together with Spears performed live for the first time on May 17 at the 2015 Billboard Music Awards, where she was also nominated for 12 Billboard Awards, and won in 3 categorizes; Top Rap Song, Top Rap Artist and Top Streaming Artist. On 29 May 2015, it was reported that The Great Escape Tour had been canceled and there would be a new tour planned around Azalea's new album to be released in 2016. Azalea later clarified she "had a different creative change of heart" and would also be taking a break to figure out the progression she wanted for her sound and visuals. In June, when asked details on her new music, she explained she had scrapped six months of work to start from scratch. On 30 August, Azalea performed "Cool for the Summer" with Demi Lovato at the 2015 MTV Video Music Awards, after a collaboration between the two was announced for Lovato's fifth studio album, Confident (2015).

In October 2015, Azalea revealed the initial title of her second album to be Digital Distortion. A buzz track off the album, "Azillion", was made available for free streaming on SoundCloud on 9 January 2016. The project's lead single, "Team", was released on 18 March 2016 along with a dance video. It debuted and peaked at number 42 on the US Billboard Hot 100, staying on the chart for eight weeks, and was certified Gold by the Recording Industry Association of America (RIAA) later that year. An accompanying music video premiered on 31 March. In March 2016, Azalea revealed she had started a production company, having "bought the rights to a couple of books that I really like, and also some television shows from Australia that I really believed in and was a fan of when I was a kid, and I had some ideas to rework [them]." In July 2016, she announced that her company, Azalea Street Productions, had signed a deal to create original content for NBCUniversal. In February 2017, it was announced the company optioned the book Bad Girls Gone for a film that Azalea would produce but nothing materialized.

On 12 June 2016, Seven Network revealed that Azalea had signed on to be a judge replacing Chris Isaak on The X Factor Australia for its eighth season, broadcast from October to November 2016. In September 2016, Azalea explained she was delaying the release of her album to 2017, despite it initially being set for July 2016, after ending the relationship with her fiancé Nick Young, stating: "[I] just needed to have some me time to get my life in order and process the changes that are happening in my private life." She also mentioned wanting to record new songs that reflected her mindset: "when I wrote [my album] I was about to get married ... I don't want to go and promote my album and get asked about my relationship that has just crumbled."

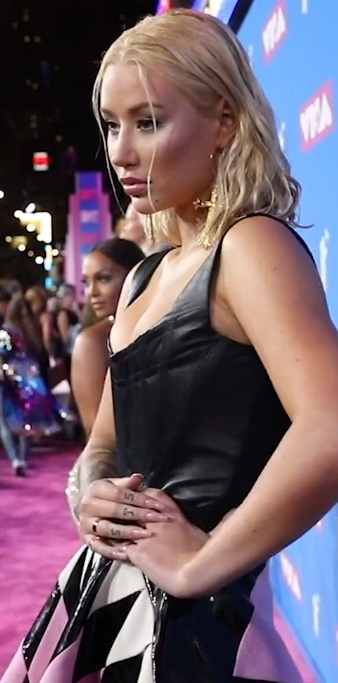
Azalea at 2018 MTV Video Music Awards

Azalea released two singles, "Mo Bounce" and "Switch", on 24 March 2017 and 19 May 2017 respectively. The latter track features Brazilian singer Anitta. Azalea promoted "Switch" through a performance on the 2017 iHeartRadio Much Music Video Awards. On 7 November 2017, Azalea stated that she was not allowed to release music until January 2018, as she signed with a new label. She additionally announced the new title of her second album, Surviving the Summer, and released four new tracks for free download via WeTransfer. The media has dubbed the songs as a four-track mixtape or EP called 4 My Ratz. In January 2018, Azalea announced the title of the lead single from Surviving the Summer, "Savior" featuring Quavo, which was released on 2 February 2018. On 20 March 2018, Azalea performed "Savior" on The Late Late Show with James Corden.

On 8 June 2018, the rapper revealed that Survive the Summer would be an EP. She also stated that the reason behind the postponed release date—originally for 2 June, then 30 June release—was the change of president of her record label, Island Records. On 5 July, Azalea released two tracks from the EP: "Tokyo Snow Trip" and "Kream", the latter featuring Tyga. "Kream" debuted at number 96 on the Billboard Hot 100, and it became Azalea's first entry on the Hot 100 since her 2016 song "Team". It was certified Platinum by the Recording Industry Association of America (RIAA) in February 2019. Survive the Summer was released on 3 August 2018, and debuted at number 144 on the Billboard 200. On 3 November 2018, Azalea tweeted that she had left Island Records, which she had signed to in 2017, and established her own record label, which was then named New Classic Records. Two weeks later, she announced she had signed a $2.7 million dollar distribution deal with an unidentified company. She stated that she would be an independent artist, be able to sign other artists, and own all her masters, with the exception of her music licensed under Universal. On 20 November 2018, it was announced that she had signed a partnership deal with Empire Distribution. She would later rename her record label Bad Dreams in January 2019. On 28 December 2018, Azalea performed on Maracanã Stadium in Rio de Janeiro when one of her dancers suffered a seizure onstage. Despite calling for ambulance mid performance, she continued singing which sparked online criticism. She later revealed that she kept singing because she thought the dancer just fell down or twisted an ankle, and expressed her feelings of being constantly under public pressure.

=== 2019: In My Defense ===
Azalea announced in early February 2019 that she had completed work on her second studio album, In My Defense. She further stated her plans to release it in the spring of that year. On 27 February, Azalea announced that "Sally Walker" would be the first single off of the album. On the same day, her previous single, "Kream", was certified gold for selling 500,000 copies in the US. At the end of March 2019, 14 days after Azalea's new single was released, "Sally Walker" had accumulated over 38 million views on YouTube had a combined total sales of over 82,000 copies sold on all platforms and had debuted on Billboard's Hot 100 Chart at number 62, making it the highest-charting single from Azalea on the Billboard charts since "Team" released in 2016, which had charted at number 42. Azalea promoted the song with a performance on Jimmy Kimmel Live! during his Las Vegas shows. On 3 May 2019, Azalea released the album's official second single, "Started", along with its official music video. Shortly afterward, a collaboration with VVAVES titled "Boys Like You" was released.

On 24 June 2019, Azalea announced via Twitter that her album In My Defense would be released on 19 July 2019. Pre-orders for the album began on 28 June 2019. Azalea appeared on the cover of Cosmopolitan in August. On 27 September 2019, Azalea announced she would be releasing a new extended play. In an interview with Entertainment Weekly, Azalea stated she was not sure if she would tour to promote the record but that she plans to begin recording new material in September, with hopes of putting it out next year. She later announced on her Twitter that she planned on releasing a new extended play on 15 November 2019 entitled Wicked Lips following the release of its lead single, "Lola". Following a few minor delays, the EP was released on 2 December. The EP was written primarily by Azalea with Noah Cyrus co-writing "The Girls", which featured Pabllo Vittar.

=== 2020–2024: The End of an Era, music retirement and business ventures ===
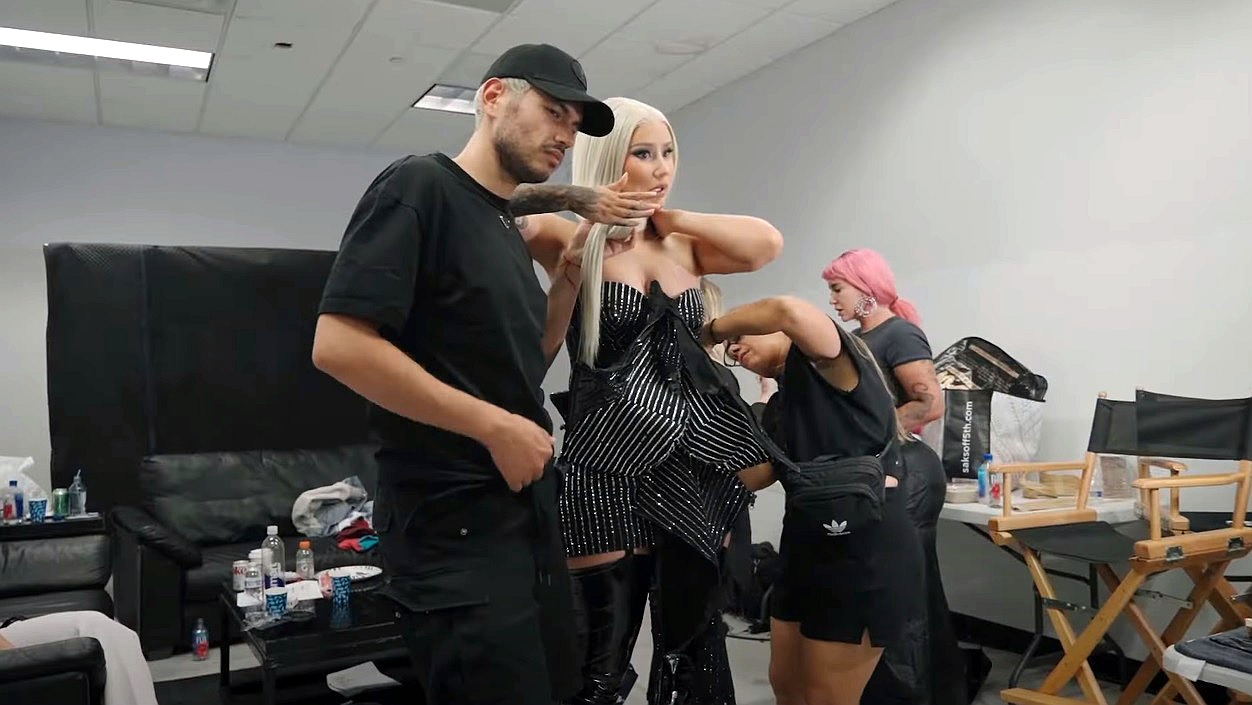
Azalea behind the scenes on her "Money Come" music video

In the summer of 2020, Azalea announced her third studio album, The End of an Era. On 20 August 2020, Azalea released the original lead single, "Dance Like Nobody's Watching", a collaboration with Tinashe. Following its underperformance, Azalea scrapped the song from The End of an Era and released the album's new lead single "Sip It" with Tyga in April 2021. In June 2021, Azalea tweeted that The End of an Era would be released in August of the same year. Later in June, Pitbull announced his I Feel Good Tour with Azalea as an opening act. On 15 July 2021, Azalea announced that she would take a hiatus from music after the release of The End of an Era.

On 8 August 2022, Azalea announced that she would resume her musical activity, and in August 2023, she released a music video for her single "Money Come", directed by herself and Christian Breslauer. In 2022, Azalea sold her music catalog to Domain Capital in an eight-figure deal, which includes Azalea's share of her music and future revenue from master recordings. Also in 2022, she announced her upcoming fourth album would be produced by Canadian singer and rapper Tory Lanez. However, due to his involvement in the shooting of fellow rapper Megan Thee Stallion, the project was put on hold. In 2023, during the sentencing phase of Lanez's trial for shooting Megan Thee Stallion, Azalea wrote a letter to the judge requesting a reduced sentence for Lanez. When the letter became public, she explained: "[…] I am not in support of throwing away ANY ones [sic] life if we can give reasonable punishments that are rehabilitative instead. I support prison reform. Period."

In January 2023, Azalea opened an OnlyFans account in promotion for her fourth album, Hotter Than Hell. In early January 2024, Azalea announced she would not continue working on the album and would instead focus on other creative projects aside from music, dispelling rumors that she was "bullied away from music" and explaining she felt "more passionately about design and creative direction than [about] songwriting". In 2024, Azalea launched $MOTHER, a memecoin on the Solana blockchain. Azalea launched Unreal Mobile, a non-contract telecommunication service, and crowdfunding platform "Dream Vault".

== Artistry ==
=== Musical style and influences ===
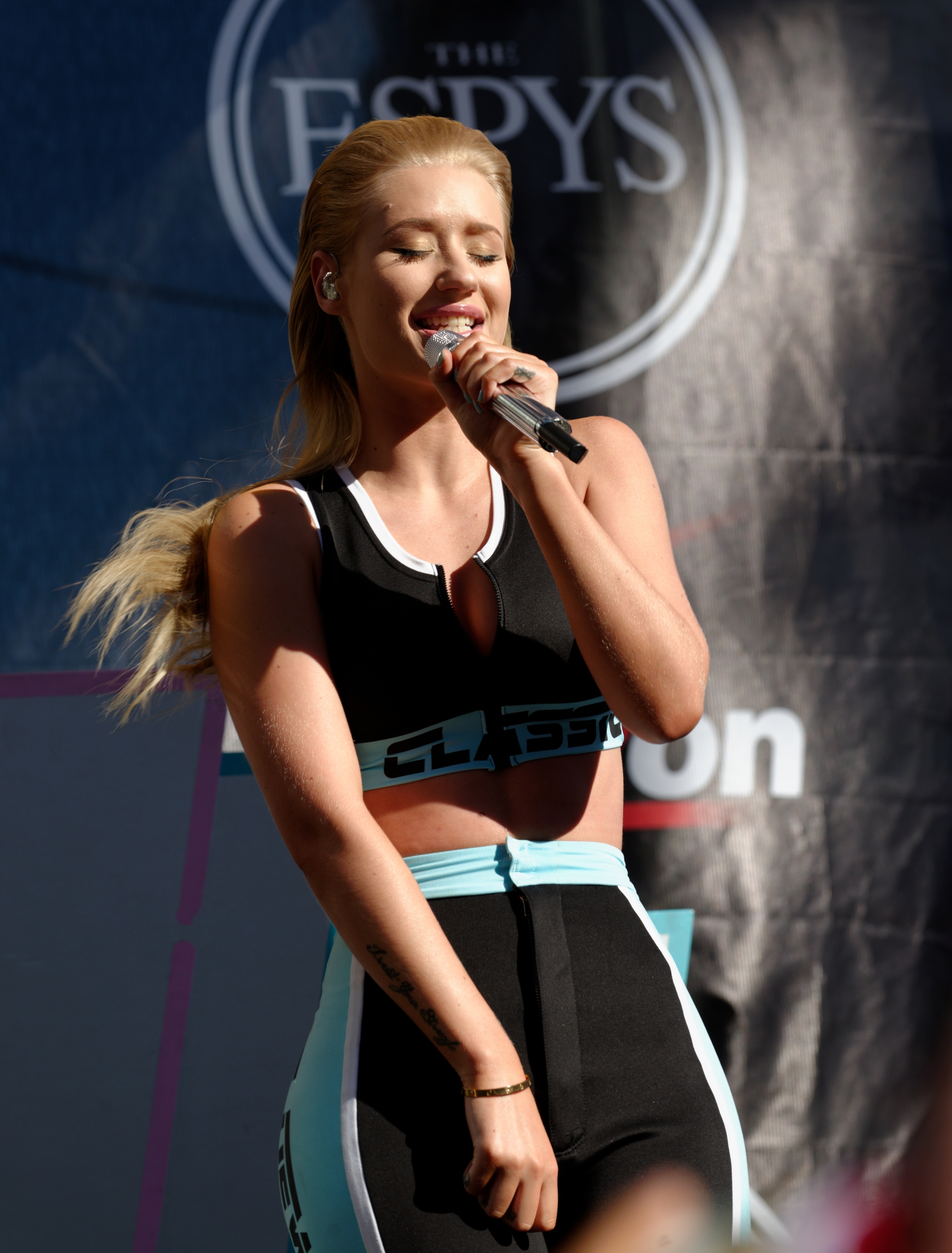
Azalea at the ESPYs in 2014

Although Azalea is Australian, she raps with an American accent. When she first moved to America, she was involved in the Southern hip hop scene of Miami and later Atlanta, which made it easy for her to cultivate the Southern influence in her music: "I lived in the South for five years; you pick up things from your surroundings and teachers. The people who taught me to rap are all from the South and so was the music I had listened to as a teen." While Azalea's debut extended play, Glory, was intended to focus on hardcore rap, the EP also touched up on other genres including electronic dance music. Music critics have defined her singles "Fancy" and "Team" as electro-hop.

At the age of 11, Azalea was infatuated with hip hop when she heard Tupac Shakur's "Baby Don't Cry (Keep Ya Head Up II)": "It was the song that made me fall in love with music and also what sparked my Tupac fascination. That would later make me pick up my own pen and write songs." In her early interviews, Azalea regularly mentioned Shakur's influence: "I was sickly obsessed. I had every picture of Tupac ever printed on my wall." She has credited Beyoncé as an influence and Missy Elliott as the female rapper who she is influenced by and admires the most. Outside of music, her fashion sense is influenced by Grace Kelly, Lil' Kim, Gwen Stefani, Fran Drescher, Eve, Trina, Fergie, Christina Aguilera, and the Spice Girls, with Azalea stating that Mel B and Victoria Beckham are her favorite Spice Girls.

=== Music videos ===
Azalea is often noted for her cinema-quality music videos which are often comedic and contain satire. Azalea has paid homage to a number of cult films from the 1990s and early 2000s in her music videos, among the most notable examples being Priscilla, Queen of the Desert (1994) in "Work" (2013), Showgirls (1995) in "Change Your Life" (2013), Clueless (1995) in "Fancy" (2014), Kill Bill (2003) in "Black Widow" (2014), Earth Girls Are Easy (1988) in "Pretty Girls" (2015), and Romy and Michele's High School Reunion (1997) in "Fuck It Up" (2019), among others. Alongside those film references, eras of cinema are referenced in several other videos including the Bollywood-themed video for "Bounce" (2013) and the 1980s cop comedy-inspired video for "Trouble" (2015). Additionally, the video for "Murda Bizness" (2012) is reminiscent of the pageant culture shown in reality series Toddlers & Tiaras.

Azalea has also been credited as a director for some of her music videos and often mentions the importance she attributes to them: "For me, visuals are as important as the music, I just love escapism and giving people something to escape to. To me, that's what art is."

== Public image ==
After initially resisting suggestions to try modeling, Azalea signed with talent agency Wilhelmina Models in 2012. She featured in promotional ads for Los Angeles-based lifestyle brand Dim Mak's 2012 fall/winter collection. Also in 2012, Azalea was the face of Levi's "Go Forth" campaign. Azalea also appeared in House of Holland's first eyewear collection campaign. In July 2014, MTV announced that Azalea would be the host of the revived House of Style, where she interviewed Jennifer Lopez, Rita Ora, Dennis Rodman and Jeremy Scott. Azalea partnered with Steve Madden and their shoe collection was unveiled in February 2015. In October 2014, Azalea and her boyfriend Nick Young were announced as the new faces of Forever 21's 2014 holiday campaign. In April 2015, she signed on to be the 100th-birthday ambassador of Australian underwear and clothing company Bonds. In 2018, Azalea was announced as Monster Products's new spokesperson and starred in their Super Bowl LII commercial.

=== Accusations of cultural appropriation ===
In 2012, Azalea caused controversy for her song "D.R.U.G.S", a remix of Kendrick Lamar's "Look Out for Detox", having adapted one of its lyrics to "When the relay starts, I'm a runaway slave / Master", leading her to release a letter online apologizing, stating that it was a "tacky and careless thing to say." According to the British newspaper The Guardian, there have been "accusations of racism against Azalea focused on her... insensitivity to the complexities of race relations and cultural appropriation." Salon writer Brittney Cooper critiqued Azalea's "co-optation and appropriation of sonic Southern Blackness, particularly the sonic Blackness of Southern Black women." Her use of an African-American English accent has been compared to blackface and part of a "broad, vague area of white people pretending to be black: those who do it culturally, rather than cosmetically" but also conversely as "wilful ignorance". Both supporters and critics of Azalea's rise to fame in the hip hop industry noted that it was important to be inclusive while acknowledging and respecting the role of African-Americans in pioneering hip hop.

After being asked to analyze and compare her speaking and rapping voice, linguistics professor David Crystal said Azalea might be doing it unconsciously to accommodate to the American rapping style, adding: "There are hardly any echoes of [Azalea's] original Australian accent in her speaking voice—just the odd word (e.g. "own", "believe") and inflection. She has developed a mixed accent (like so many people have these days) as a result of her traveling around." When asked about the validity to the criticisms leveled against her, Azalea stated: "Do you not like me because I rap with an American accent and I'm not American? Well, that's valid on some level because that's your opinion and I can't change that", continuing, "But I'm not trying to sound black—I just grew up in a country where on TV and in music and film, everyone was American or any Australian person in them put on an American accent. So I never saw it as strange at all."

In 2021, after Azalea released the music video for her song "Iam the Stripclub", some Twitter commentators accused her of blackfishing or "imitating a black female aesthetic"; Azalea called the allegations "ridiculous and baseless" and said that she had worn the same Armani foundation for the past three years "in every video since 'Sally Walker'". Her makeup artist Eros J. Gomez took to Twitter to defend and clarify that Azalea was using the same foundation in all the music video scenes.

=== Comments on racism ===
In 2016, Azalea lamented, "Many people think I still live in that bubble and that I don't understand that the United States is set up in a way that doesn't benefit minorities. I've lived here for 10 years now, and I don't want it to be that way either. I'm marrying a black man and my children will be half black—of course I care about these things." She further dismissed the legitimacy of the racial controversy, citing sexism as the true cause of criticism. In a feature covering Azalea's career, Clover Hope wrote, "Rather than seeing race as an issue, Iggy focused on the trend of women in rap being over-policed and accused of not writing their own rhymes, while in the process overlooking how artists like herself and Macklemore hold a broader industry advantage, even as they feel like outcasts in their field." She was planning to release her second album titled, Digital Distortion, explaining its concept: addressing the criticisms against her: "some of them were fair and some of them, I think, were unfair. I just think it's interesting that we live in this age of digital distortion where we're all distorting each other and distorting ourselves and our perception of who we all are, and none of it is really accurate anymore." She later credited the support she received from fellow rappers as giving her motivation facing the controversial claims in the media: "I grew up loving Missy Elliott, loving Lil' Kim or Trina and so I'm lucky I have those women I really idolized support me. So, I get a little bit confident in that, knowing the people I look up to appreciate what I'm doing."

In 2018, Azalea claimed that the history of racism in the United States causes its audiences to dismiss her, and claimed that she "grew up in a situation that didn't involve any privilege and I worked really hard", later reiterating on U.S. race relations: "I make 'black' music. I don't want people to think it's not something I care about. I want to make music for girls in the gym." She stated, "It's important for music to reflect what is going on socially and for there to be those kinds of voices within the industry. But I want to be that person you can listen to for four minutes and not think about that stuff at all, and it's important to have that too [...] I'm not here to offer that commentary, but that doesn't mean I don't care."

== Unpaid royalty claims ==
In 2025 Azalea launched claims against Universal Music Group (UMG) for unpaid royalties related to International record sales, stating: "Crazy how in my entire career I was never paid a single royalty by Universal Music Group for anything outside of the USA."

== Personal life ==
Azalea claims partial Aboriginal ancestry, stating, "My family came to Australia on the First Fleet. My family's been in that country for a long time, over 100 years. If your family's lived in Australia for a long time, everyone has a little bit of [Aboriginal blood]. I know my family does because we have an eye condition that only Aborigine people have."

In March 2015, while talking about her body shape with Vogue, Azalea revealed she had undergone breast augmentation, saying, "I did change something: Four months ago, I got bigger boobs! I'd thought about it my entire life", adding she was sick of having to sew padding into her stage costumes and wanted to be able to wear lingerie without wiring. After initially resolving never to discuss it publicly as she did not want other girls to feel bad about their bodies, she concluded, "But then, I decided I wasn't into secret-keeping." In August 2015, she talked about having a rhinoplasty, or nose job with Seventeen magazine, adding, "Your perception of yourself can change a lot over time, so I think it's important to wait and make sure it's the right choice. Plastic surgery is an emotional journey. ... There are things that I didn't like about myself that I changed through surgery. There are other things I dislike but I've learned to accept. It's important to remember you can't change everything. You can never be perfect."

In March 2018, Azalea was approved for permanent residence in the United States.

Azalea has a chronic wound on her leg following an infection.

=== Relationships ===
In late 2011, Azalea began dating American rapper ASAP Rocky, whom she met through American record producer Chase N. Cashe. She confirmed that they were dating in a January 2012 interview with Vibe and, around this time, got the title of Rocky's breakout mixtape Live. Love. ASAP tattooed on her fingers. She claimed she and Rocky both had tattoos dedicated to the relationship, but his tattoos were not visible. In July 2012, Rocky stated they were no longer dating, with Azalea later removing her tattoo after years with the word A$AP crossed out.

In November 2013, Azalea began a relationship with Los Angeles Lakers basketball player Nick Young. Azalea and Young were featured in the March 2014 issue of GQ magazine. They lived together in Tarzana, California. On 1 June 2015, they announced their engagement. On 19 June 2016, Azalea announced that she and Young had split after a video leaked on the internet showing Young bragging about cheating on Azalea.

In late 2018, Azalea began dating American rapper Playboi Carti. The couple reportedly split in December 2019. In June 2020, Azalea announced she had given birth to a son with Carti. That October, she released a statement saying, "I'm raising my son alone & I'm not in a relationship." Later in December, Azalea revealed that Carti had cheated on her and missed their son's birth. He later refused to sign their son's birth certificate. In July 2024, she stated that she was "very much the only parent" to the child.

== Discography ==
- The New Classic (2014)
- In My Defense (2019)
- The End of an Era (2021)

== Tours ==
=== Headlining ===
- The New Classic Tour (2014)

Cancelled tours

- Great Escape Tour (2015)
- Bad Girls Tour (2018)

=== Opening act ===
- XXL Freshmen Live Tour (2012)
- Tyga – MTV Jams Presents: Closer to My Dreams Tour (2012)
- Rita Ora – Ora Tour (2012)
- Rita Ora – Radioactive Tour (2013)
- Nas – Life Is Good Tour (2013)
- Beyoncé – The Mrs. Carter Show World Tour (2013)
- Pitbull – I Feel Good Tour (2021)
- Pitbull – Can't Stop Us Now Summer Tour (2022)

== Awards and nominations ==
Iggy Azalea has been nominated for numerous major music awards. Azalea was the first female and first non-American rapper to be featured on XXL's "Top 10 Freshman List". In 2014, she received two American Music Awards in the Rap/Hip-Hop categories, along with four more nominations, and one MTV Video Music Award for her collaboration with Ariana Grande, along with seven more nominations, making her the most nominated artist at these respective award show editions. She has also won three Teen Choice Awards and one MTV Europe Music Award. Azalea won the 2014 ARIA Award for Breakthrough Artist and the 2015 People's Choice Award for Favorite Hip-Hop Artist.

In November 2014, she was placed at number-one on the Maxim Hot 100 list in Australia because "few Aussies, female or otherwise, have had a bigger 2014 than Iggy." Azalea also ranked at number 46 on the 2014 edition of the AMID (Australasian Music Industry Directory) Power 50, a list that compiles the most influential figures in the Australasian music world. Azalea received four nominations at the 57th Annual Grammy Awards, including Best New Artist, Record of the Year and Best Pop Duo/Group Performance for "Fancy" and Best Rap Album for The New Classic. Azalea joined the list of the 9th Annual Billboard Women in Music honorees as a chart-topper. In late 2014, it was announced she was placed at number-one on Billboard Year-End's Top New Artists chart. In 2015, Azalea also led the 2015 iHeartRadio Music Awards nominations with five. She received twelve nominations at the 2015 Billboard Music Awards. In 2016, Azalea was presented with the Woman of the Year award by GQ Australia. In 2020, Iggy Azalea was listed at number 50 in Rolling Stone Australia's "50 Greatest Australian Artists of All Time" issue.

== See also ==
- List of artists who reached number one in the United States

Preceded by Hozier	Saturday Night Live musical guest 25 October 2014	Succeeded by Prince
