= 41st People's Choice Awards =

Pop culture award show held in 2015

- Date: January 7, 2015
- Location: Nokia Theatre, Los Angeles, California
- Hosted by: Anna Faris and Allison Janney

Television/radio coverage
- Network: CBS

The 41st People's Choice Awards, honoring the best in popular culture for 2014, were held January 7, 2015, at the Nokia Theatre in Los Angeles, California, and were broadcast live on CBS at 9:00 pm EST. The ceremony was hosted by Mom stars Anna Faris and Allison Janney. Nominations were announced on November 4, 2014.

Shailene Woodley led the movie nominees with four, including Favorite Movie Duo, in which she was nominated twice for her films Divergent and The Fault in Our Stars. In the television categories, Grey's Anatomy, Supernatural and The Vampire Diaries led the nominees with five each. Sam Smith had four music nominations.

== Performances ==
- Lady Antebellum – "Freestyle"
- Fall Out Boy – "Centuries"
- Iggy Azalea – "Beg for It"

== Presenters ==
- Kaley Cuoco
- Josh Gad
- Kevin Hart
- Dax Shepard
- Anthony Anderson
- Olivia Munn
- Monica Potter
- Katharine McPhee
- The Band Perry
- Ellen DeGeneres
- Beth Behrs
- Kat Dennings
- Patricia Arquette
- Thomas Lennon
- Cote de Pablo
- Lisa Edelstein
- Dave Annable
- Amy Adams
- Kevin Connolly
- Adrian Grenier
- Jerry Ferrara
- Gabrielle Union
- Portia de Rossi
- Bellamy Young
- Sarah Hyland
- Ginnifer Goodwin
- Gina Rodriguez
- Rainn Wilson

== Winners ==
The full list of nominees and winners are as follows:

=== Movies ===
Favorite Movie	Favorite Action Movie
Maleficent; 22 Jump Street; Captain America: The Winter Soldier; Guardians of the Galaxy; X-Men: Days of Future Past	Divergent; The Amazing Spider-Man 2; Captain America: The Winter Soldier; Guardians of the Galaxy; X-Men: Days of Future Past
Favorite Comedic Movie	Favorite Dramatic Movie
22 Jump Street; Blended; Let's Be Cops; Neighbors; The Other Woman	The Fault in Our Stars; The Giver; Heaven Is for Real; If I Stay; Noah
Favorite Movie Actor	Favorite Movie Actress
Robert Downey Jr.; Hugh Jackman; Brad Pitt; Channing Tatum; Mark Wahlberg	Jennifer Lawrence; Scarlett Johansson; Angelina Jolie; Melissa McCarthy; Emma Stone
Favorite Action Movie Actor	Favorite Action Movie Actress
Chris Evans; Hugh Jackman; Liam Neeson; Mark Wahlberg; Denzel Washington	Jennifer Lawrence; Scarlett Johansson; Angelina Jolie; Shailene Woodley; Zoe Saldaña
Favorite Comedic Movie Actor	Favorite Comedic Movie Actress
Adam Sandler; Zac Efron; Jonah Hill; Seth Rogen; Channing Tatum	Melissa McCarthy; Drew Barrymore; Cameron Diaz; Tina Fey; Charlize Theron
Favorite Dramatic Movie Actor	Favorite Dramatic Movie Actress
Robert Downey Jr.; Ben Affleck; George Clooney; Matt Damon; Brad Pitt	Chloë Grace Moretz; Emma Stone; Meryl Streep; Reese Witherspoon; Shailene Woodley
Favorite Movie Duo	Favorite Family Movie
Shailene Woodley & Theo James (Divergent); Chris Evans & Scarlett Johansson (Captain America: The Winter Soldier); Andrew Garfield & Emma Stone (The Amazing Spider-Man 2); Jonah Hill & Channing Tatum (22 Jump Street); Shailene Woodley & Ansel Elgort (The Fault in Our Stars)	Maleficent; Alexander and the Terrible, Horrible, No Good, Very Bad Day; How to Train Your Dragon 2; The Lego Movie; Rio 2
Favorite Thriller Movie
Gone Girl; Annabelle; Dracula Untold; The Equalizer; The Purge: Anarchy

=== Television ===
Favorite TV Show	Favorite Network TV Comedy
The Big Bang Theory; Game of Thrones; NCIS; Once Upon a Time; The Walking Dead	The Big Bang Theory; 2 Broke Girls; Modern Family; Mom; New Girl
Favorite Network TV Drama	Favorite Network TV Sci-Fi/Fantasy
Grey's Anatomy; Chicago Fire; Downton Abbey; Revenge; Scandal	Beauty & the Beast; Agents of S.H.I.E.L.D.; Once Upon a Time; Supernatural; The Vampire Diaries
Favorite Comedic TV Actor	Favorite Comedic TV Actress
Chris Colfer; Ty Burrell; Jesse Tyler Ferguson; Ashton Kutcher; Jim Parsons	Kaley Cuoco-Sweeting; Zooey Deschanel; Melissa McCarthy; Amy Poehler; Sofía Vergara
Favorite Dramatic TV Actor	Favorite Dramatic TV Actress
Patrick Dempsey; Justin Chambers; Taylor Kinney; Dax Shepard; Jesse Williams	Ellen Pompeo; Alyssa Milano; Hayden Panettiere; Emily VanCamp; Kerry Washington
Favorite Sci-Fi/Fantasy TV Actor	Favorite Sci-Fi/Fantasy TV Actress
Misha Collins; Jensen Ackles; Jared Padalecki; Ian Somerhalder; Paul Wesley	Kristin Kreuk; Nina Dobrev; Ginnifer Goodwin; Jessica Lange; Jennifer Morrison
Favorite Cable TV Comedy	Favorite Cable TV Drama
Melissa & Joey; Baby Daddy; Cougar Town; Faking It; Young & Hungry	Pretty Little Liars; Bates Motel; Rizzoli & Isles; Sons of Anarchy; True Detective
Favorite Cable Sci-Fi/Fantasy TV Show	Favorite Cable TV Actor
Outlander; American Horror Story; Doctor Who; Game of Thrones; The Walking Dead	Matt Bomer; Sean Bean; Eric Dane; Charlie Hunnam; William H. Macy
Favorite Cable TV Actress	Favorite TV Dramedy
Angie Harmon; Kristen Bell; Ashley Benson; Courteney Cox; Lucy Hale	Orange Is the New Black; Awkward; Shameless; Suits; White Collar
Favorite Competition TV Show	Favorite TV Icon
The Voice; America's Got Talent; Dancing with the Stars; Hell's Kitchen; MasterChef	Betty White; Tim Allen; Mark Harmon; Katey Sagal; Tom Selleck
Favorite Daytime TV Host(s)	Favorite Late Night Talk Show Host
Ellen DeGeneres; Steve Harvey; Queen Latifah; Kelly Ripa & Michael Strahan; Rachael Ray	Jimmy Fallon; Craig Ferguson; Jimmy Kimmel; David Letterman; Conan O'Brien
Favorite TV Duo	Favorite TV Character We Miss Most
Nina Dobrev & Ian Somerhalder (The Vampire Diaries); David Boreanaz & Emily Deschanel (Bones); Ginnifer Goodwin & Josh Dallas (Once Upon a Time); Jared Padalecki & Jensen Ackles (Supernatural); Nathan Fillion & Stana Katic (Castle)	Dr. Cristina Yang (Grey's Anatomy); Lance Sweets (Bones); Hershel Greene (The Walking Dead); Leslie Shay (Chicago Fire); Neal Cassidy (Once Upon a Time)
Favorite Actor In A New TV Series	Favorite Actress In A New TV Series
David Tennant; Ben McKenzie; Dylan McDermott; Laurence Fishburne; Scott Bakula	Viola Davis; Debra Messing; Jada Pinkett Smith; Octavia Spencer; Téa Leoni
Favorite Sketch Comedy TV Show	Favorite Animated TV Show
Saturday Night Live; Drunk History; Inside Amy Schumer; Key & Peele; Kroll Show	The Simpsons; American Dad!; Bob's Burgers; Family Guy; South Park
Favorite New TV Comedy	Favorite New TV Drama
Jane the Virgin; A to Z; Bad Judge; Black-ish; Cristela; Marry Me; The McCarthys; The Mysteries of Laura; Mulaney; Selfie	The Flash; Constantine; Forever; Gotham; How to Get Away with Murder

=== Music ===
Favorite Male Artist	Favorite Female Artist
Ed Sheeran; Blake Shelton; John Legend; Pharrell Williams; Sam Smith	Taylor Swift; Beyoncé; Iggy Azalea; Katy Perry; Sia
Favorite Group/Band	Favorite Breakout Artist
Maroon 5; Coldplay; Imagine Dragons; One Direction; OneRepublic	5 Seconds of Summer; Charli XCX; Fifth Harmony; Meghan Trainor; Sam Smith
Favorite Male Country Artist	Favorite Female Country Artist
Hunter Hayes; Luke Bryan; Tim McGraw; Brad Paisley; Blake Shelton	Carrie Underwood; Faith Hill; Lucy Hale; Miranda Lambert; Dolly Parton
Favorite Country Group	Favorite Pop Artist
Lady Antebellum; The Band Perry; Florida Georgia Line; Rascal Flatts; Zac Brown Band	Taylor Swift; Beyoncé; Jennifer Lopez; Jessie J; Sia
Favorite Hip-Hop Artist	Favorite R&B Artist
Iggy Azalea; Drake; Jay-Z; Nicki Minaj; T.I.	Pharrell Williams; Chris Brown; Jennifer Hudson; John Legend; Usher
Favorite Song	Favorite Album
"Shake It Off", Taylor Swift; "All About That Bass", Meghan Trainor; "Bang Bang", Jessie J with Ariana Grande & Nicki Minaj; "Maps", Maroon 5; "Stay with Me", Sam Smith	X, Ed Sheeran; G I R L, Pharrell Williams; Ghost Stories, Coldplay; In the Lonely Hour, Sam Smith; My Everything, Ariana Grande
