= Iggy Azalea discography =

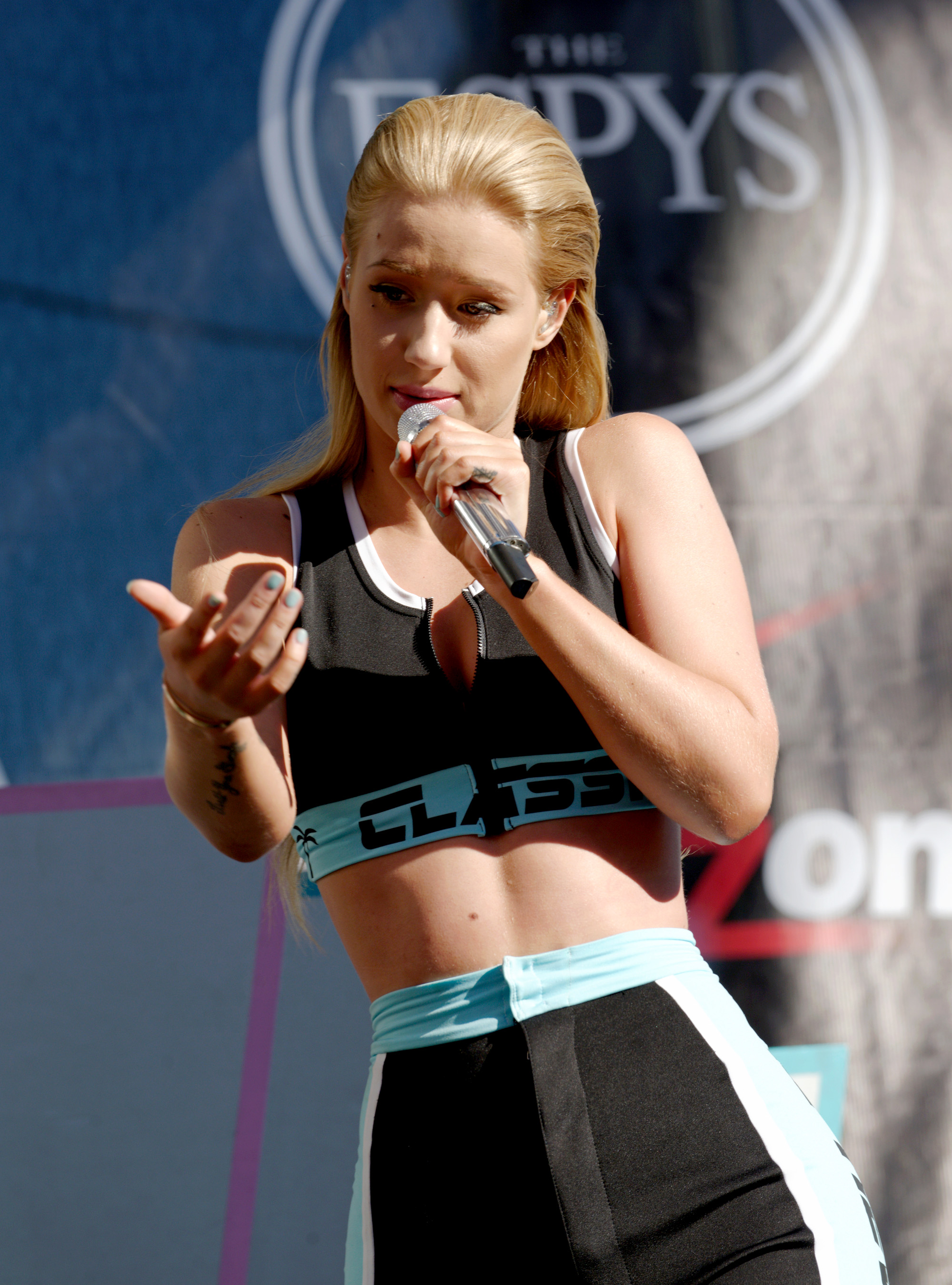
- Azalea performing in 2014
- Studio albums: 3
- Extended plays: 5
- Singles: 26
- Reissues: 1
- Mixtapes: 2
- Promotional singles: 9

Australian rapper Iggy Azalea has released three studio albums, five extended plays (EPs), two mixtapes and seventeen singles (including four as a featured artist). In September 2011, Azalea released her first mixtape, Ignorant Art. Following the release, Azalea signed a recording contract with T.I.'s record label Grand Hustle. In July 2012, she released a free EP entitled Glory, and in October of that year, Azalea released her second mixtape, TrapGold.

In April 2014, Azalea released her debut studio album, The New Classic, which peaked inside the top five on the record charts of countries including the United States, Australia and the United Kingdom. The first three singles from the album, "Work", "Bounce" and "Change Your Life" experienced moderate success. The fourth single, "Fancy" featuring Charli XCX, reached number one on the US Billboard Hot 100, reigning for seven consecutive weeks, and peaked within the top five charts of Australia and the United Kingdom. The song was one of the best-selling singles worldwide in 2014. Azalea’s newfound success was followed with "Black Widow" featuring Rita Ora, the fifth single from The New Classic, which became a top five hit in the US and the UK. During this time, Azalea was also featured on Ariana Grande's single "Problem", which peaked at number two in the United States and, likewise to ”Fancy”, became one of the top-selling singles of 2014. In November 2014, Azalea released a reissue of her debut studio album titled Reclassified, which included the singles "Beg for It" and "Trouble". Azalea achieved three top ten hits simultaneously on the Billboard Hot 100 in 2014. Her second album Digital Distortion was set to be released in the summer of 2016, but was shelved. The album had been promoted with the singles "Team", "Mo Bounce", and "Switch".

In late 2017, Azalea announced she had left Def Jam Recordings and would be releasing a new project titled Surviving the Summer under a new record label in the following year, without any of the material originally intended for Digital Distortion. Azalea then released a new single, "Savior" featuring Quavo, on 1 February through Island Records. In July 2018, it was announced that the EP Survive the Summer would be released on August 3, and feature the single "Kream". On March 1, 2019, she announced that "Sally Walker" would be the lead single for her second album, In My Defense, which was released on July 19, 2019.

In the summer of 2020, Azalea announced her third studio album, The End of an Era. On 20 August 2020, Azalea released the original lead single, "Dance Like Nobody's Watching", a collaboration with Tinashe. Following its underperformance, Azalea scrapped the song from The End of an Era and released the album's new lead single "Sip It" with Tyga in April 2021. In June 2021, Azalea tweeted that The End of an Era would be released in August of the same year. On August 25, 2023, Azalea released her new single "Money Come", her first solo release in two years.

== Studio albums ==
List of albums, with selected details, chart positions and certifications
Title	Album details	Peak chart positions										Certifications
Title	Album details	AUS	CAN	IRE	NLD	NZ	SWE	UK	US	US R&B/ HH	US Rap	Certifications
The New Classic	Released: 21 April 2014; Label: Virgin EMI, Def Jam; Format: CD, LP, digital download, streaming	2	2	13	58	3	12	5	3	1	1	ARIA: Gold; BPI: Gold; MC: Gold; RIAA: 2× Platinum; RMNZ: Platinum
In My Defense	Released: 19 July 2019; Label: Bad Dreams, Empire; Format: CD, LP, digital download, streaming, cassette	52	—	— (Note: "In My Defense" did not enter the Irish Albums Chart, but peaked at number 13 on the Irish Independent Albums Chart.)	—	—	—	— (Note: "In My Defense" did not enter the UK Albums Chart, but peaked at number seven on the UK R&B Albums Chart.)	50	25	22	
The End of an Era	Released: 13 August 2021; Label: Bad Dreams, Empire; Format: CD, LP, digital download, streaming	— (Note: "End Of An Era" did not enter the AUS, but reached number 9 on the ARIA Top 10 Australian HIP HOP/R&B Albums chart.)	—	—	—	—	—	— (Note: "End of an Era" did not enter the UK Albums Chart, but reached number 36 on the UK R&B Albums Chart.)	—	—	—	
"—" denotes a recording that did not chart or was not released in that territory.

=== Reissues ===
List of reissues, with selected details, chart positions and certifications
Title	Album details	Peak chart positions										Certifications
Title	Album details	AUS	AUS Urb.	DEN	SCO	SWE	UK	UK R&B	US	US R&B/ HH	US Rap	Certifications
Reclassified	Released: 21 November 2014; Label: Virgin EMI, Def Jam; Formats: CD, LP, digital download, streaming	32	3	31	50	32	38	4	16	6	5	BPI: Gold; RMNZ: Gold; ZPAV: Gold

== EPs ==
List of extended plays, with selected details and chart positions
Title	Details	Peak chart positions				
Title	Details	AUS Dig.	US	US Dig.	US Heat	US R&B/ HH
Glory	Released: 30 July 2012; Label: Grand Hustle; Format: Digital download	—	—	—	—	—
Change Your Life	Released: 8 October 2013; Label: Island Def Jam; Format: CD, digital download	—	—	—	33	66
iTunes Festival: London 2013	Released: 25 October 2013 (UK only); Label: Virgin EMI; Format: Digital download	—	—	—	—	—
Survive the Summer	Released: 3 August 2018; Label: Island; Format: Digital download, streaming	17	144	13	—	—
Wicked Lips	Released: 2 December 2019; Label: Bad Dreams, Empire; Format: CD, LP, digital download, streaming, cassette	—	—	—	—	— (Note: "Wicked Lips" did not enter the Top R&B/Hip-Hop Albums, but peaked at number 42 on the R&B/Hip-Hop Album Sales chart.)
"—" denotes releases that did not chart or were not released in that territory.

== Mixtapes ==
List of mixtapes, with selected details
Title	Details
Ignorant Art	Released: 27 September 2011; Label: Self-released; Format: Digital download
TrapGold	Released: 11 October 2012; Label: Self-released; Format: Digital download

== Singles ==
=== As lead artist ===
List of singles as lead artist, with selected chart positions and certifications, showing year released and album name
Title	Year	Peak chart positions										Certifications	Album
Title	Year	AUS	CAN	DEN	FRA	IRE	NLD	NZ	SWE	UK	US	Certifications	Album
"Work"	2013	79	87	—	—	42	—	—	—	17	54	ARIA: Gold; BPI: Gold; MC: Gold; RIAA: 2× Platinum; RMNZ: Gold	The New Classic
"Bounce"	2013	— (Note: "Bounce" did not enter the Australian Singles Chart, but peaked at number 18 on the Australian Urban Singles Chart.)	—	—	—	34	—	—	—	13	— (Note: "Bounce" did not enter the Billboard Hot 100, but peaked at number one on the Bubbling Under R&B/Hip-Hop Singles chart.)	RIAA: Gold	The New Classic
"Change Your Life" (featuring T.I.)	2013	44	—	—	—	28	—	38	—	10	— (Note: "Change Your Life" did not enter the Billboard Hot 100, but peaked at number 22 on the Bubbling Under Hot 100 Singles chart.)	ARIA: Gold; BPI: Silver; RIAA: Gold; RMNZ: Gold	The New Classic
"Fancy" (featuring Charli XCX)	2014	5	1	36	21	12	29	1	23	5	1	ARIA: 4× Platinum; BPI: 2× Platinum; IFPI DEN: Platinum; IFPI SWE: 2× Platinum; MC: 4× Platinum; RIAA: 9× Platinum; RMNZ: 3× Platinum	The New Classic
"Black Widow" (featuring Rita Ora)	2014	15	6	19	9	9	13	11	23	4	3	ARIA: Platinum; BPI: Platinum; IFPI DEN: Platinum; IFPI SWE: 2× Platinum; MC: 2× Platinum; RIAA: 5× Platinum; RMNZ: Platinum	The New Classic
"Beg for It" (featuring MØ)	2014	29	44	—	—	—	—	—	—	111	27	RIAA: Platinum	Reclassified
"Trouble" (featuring Jennifer Hudson)	2015	10	73	—	—	20	—	—	—	7	67	ARIA: Platinum; BPI: Platinum; RIAA: Gold; RMNZ: Gold	Reclassified
"Pretty Girls" (with Britney Spears)	2015	27	16	—	25	60	—	—	—	16	29	RIAA: Gold	Non-album singles
"Team"	2016	40	41	—	89	—	—	— (Note: "Team" did not enter the NZ Top 40 Singles Chart, but peaked at number six on the NZ Heatseekers Singles Chart.)	—	62	42	RIAA: Gold; RMNZ: Gold	Non-album singles
"Mo Bounce"	2017	63	87	—	— (Note: "Mo Bounce" did not enter the France Top Singles, but peaked at number 136 on the France Downloads chart.)	—	—	— (Note: "Mo Bounce" did not enter the NZ Top 40 Singles Chart, but peaked at number 10 on the NZ Heatseekers Singles Chart.)	—	— (Note: "Mo Bounce" did not enter the UK Singles Chart, but peaked at number 53 on the UK Singles Downloads Chart.)	— (Note: "Mo Bounce" did not enter the Billboard Hot 100, but peaked at number 17 on the Bubbling Under Hot 100 Singles chart.)		Non-album singles
"Switch" (featuring Anitta)	2017	180	— (Note: "Switch" did not enter the Canadian Hot 100, but peaked at number 39 on the Canada CHR/Top 40 chart.)	—	—	—	—	—	—	—	—		Non-album singles
"Savior" (featuring Quavo)	2018	— (Note: "Savior" did not enter the Australian Singles Chart, but peaked at number 29 on the Australian Urban Singles Chart.)	— (Note: "Savior" did not enter the Canadian Hot 100, but peaked at number 32 on the Hot Canadian Digital Songs chart.)	—	— (Note: "Savior" did not enter the France Top Singles, but peaked at number 159 on the France Downloads chart.)	—	—	— (Note: "Savior" did not enter the NZ Top 40 Singles Chart, but peaked at number eight on the NZ Heatseeker Singles Chart.)	—	—	— (Note: "Savior" did not enter the Billboard Hot 100, but peaked at number seven on the Bubbling Under Hot 100 Singles chart.)		Non-album singles
"Kream" (featuring Tyga)	2018	— (Note: "Kream" did not enter the Australian Singles Chart, but peaked at number 27 on the Australian Digital Tracks Chart.)	54	—	— (Note: "Kream" did not enter the France Top Singles, but peaked at number 148 on the France Downloads chart.)	96	—	— (Note: "Kream" did not enter the NZ Top 40 Singles Chart, but peaked at number 11 on the NZ Hot Singles Chart.)	—	—	96	RIAA: Platinum; RMNZ: Gold	Survive the Summer
"Sally Walker"	2019	— (Note: "Sally Walker" did not enter the Australian Singles Chart, but peaked at number 43 on the Australian Digital Tracks Chart.)	56	—	— (Note: "Sally Walker" did not enter the France Top Singles, but peaked at number 140 on the France Downloads chart.)	70	—	— (Note: "Sally Walker" did not enter the NZ Top 40 Singles Chart, but peaked at number nine on the NZ Hot Singles Chart.)	—	82	62	RIAA: Gold	In My Defense
"Started"	2019	— (Note: "Started" did not enter the Australian Singles Chart, but peaked at number 37 on the Australian Digital Tracks Chart.)	— (Note: "Started" did not enter the Canadian Hot 100, but peaked at number 30 on the Hot Canadian Digital Songs chart.)	—	— (Note: "Started" did not enter the France Top Singles, but peaked at number 122 on the France Downloads chart.)	73	—	— (Note: "Started" did not enter the NZ Top 40 Singles Chart, but peaked at number 11 on the NZ Hot Singles Chart.)	—	76	— (Note: "Started" did not enter the Billboard Hot 100, but peaked at number 20 on the Bubbling Under Hot 100 Singles chart.)	RIAA: Gold	In My Defense
"Fuck It Up" (featuring Kash Doll)	2019	—	—	—	—	—	—	— (Note: "Fuck It Up" did not enter the NZ Top 40 Singles Chart, but peaked at number 40 on the NZ Hot Singles Chart.)	—	—	—		In My Defense
"Lola" (with Alice Chater)	2019	—	—	—	—	—	—	— (Note: "Lola" did not enter the NZ Top 40 Singles Chart, but peaked at number 28 on the NZ Hot Singles Chart.)	—	— (Note: "Lola" did not enter the UK Singles Chart, but peaked at 84 on the UK Singles Downloads Chart.)	— (Note: "Lola" did not enter the Billboard Hot 100, but peaked at number 9 on the Rap Digital Songs chart.)		Wicked Lips
"Dance Like Nobody's Watching" (with Tinashe)	2020	—	—	—	—	—	—	—	—	—	— (Note: "Dance Like Nobody's Watching" did not enter the Billboard Hot 100, but peaked at number 33 on the Digital Songs chart.)		Non-album single
"Sip It" (with Tyga) (Note: This song is included on the deluxe edition of The End of an Era.)	2021	—	—	—	—	—	—	— (Note: "Sip It" did not enter the NZ Top 40 Singles Chart, but peaked at number 40 on the NZ Hot Singles Chart.)	—	—	—		The End of an Era
"Iam the Stripclub"	2021	—	—	—	—	—	—	—	—	—	— (Note: "I Am The Stripclub" did not enter the Billboard Hot 100, but peaked at number 15 on the Rap Digital Songs chart.)		The End of an Era
"Money Come" (solo or remix featuring Ivorian Doll and Big Boss Vette)	2023	—	—	—	—	—	—	—	—	—	— (Note: "Money Come" did not enter the Billboard Hot 100, but peaked at number 13 on the R&B/Hip-Hop Digital Songs chart.)		Non-album single
"—" denotes releases that did not chart or were not released in that territory.

=== As featured artist ===
List of singles as featured artist, with selected chart positions and certifications, showing year released and album name
Title	Year	Peak chart positions										Certifications	Album
Title	Year	AUS	CAN	DEN	FRA	IRE	NLD	NZ	SWE	UK	US	Certifications	Album
"Beat Down" (Steve Aoki and Angger Dimas featuring Iggy Azalea)	2012	—	—	—	—	—	59	—	—	44	—		Wonderland (Remixed)
"Problem" (Ariana Grande featuring Iggy Azalea)	2014	2	3	5	14	1	10	1	5	1	2	ARIA: 6× Platinum; BPI: 2× Platinum; IFPI DEN: 2× Platinum; IFPI SWE: 3× Platinum; MC: 4× Platinum; RIAA: 8× Platinum; RMNZ: 2× Platinum	My Everything
"No Mediocre" (T.I. featuring Iggy Azalea)	2014	36	59	—	35	—	—	34	—	49	33	ARIA: Gold; MC: Gold; RIAA: Platinum; RMNZ: Platinum	Paperwork
"Booty" (Jennifer Lopez featuring Iggy Azalea)	2014	27	11	—	93	—	—	30	—	137	18	RIAA: Platinum	A.K.A.
"Boys Like You" (Vvaves featuring Iggy Azalea)	2019	—	—	—	—	—	—	—	—	—	—		Non-album single
"—" denotes releases that did not chart or were not released in that territory.

=== Promotional singles ===
List of promotional singles, with selected chart positions and certifications, showing year released and album name
Title	Year	Peak chart positions										Certifications	Album
Title	Year	AUS	AUS Urb.	CAN	FRA	GER	SWI	UK	UK R&B	US	US R&B/HH	Certifications	Album
"Know About Me (Remix)" (DJ Green Lantern and Valentino Khan featuring Iggy Azalea)	2014	—	—	—	—	—	—	—	—	—	—		Non-album single
"Impossible Is Nothing"	2014	—	—	—	—	—	—	168	30	—	—		The New Classic
"Iggy SZN"	2014	95	11	— (Note: "Iggy SZN" did not enter the Canadian Hot 100, but peaked at number 63 on the Hot Canadian Digital Songs chart.)	—	—	—	—	—	—	48		Reclassified
"Go Hard or Go Home" (with Wiz Khalifa)	2015	60	12	65	77	47	55	110	19	86	29	RIAA: Gold	Furious 7
"All Hands on Deck (Remix)" (Tinashe featuring Iggy Azalea)	2015	45	—	—	—	—	—	156	34	— (Note: "All Hands on Deck" (Remix) did not enter the Billboard Hot 100, but peaked at number one on the Bubbling Under Hot 100 Singles chart.)	33	ARIA: Gold	Non-album single
"Just Wanna"	2019	—	—	—	—	—	—	—	—	—	—		In My Defense
"Brazil" (solo or remix with Gloria Groove)	2021	—	—	—	—	—	—	—	—	—	—		The End of an Era
"Sex on the Beach" (with Sophia Scott)	2021	—	—	—	—	—	—	—	—	—	—		The End of an Era
"Knock Yourself Out" (with Sophia Scott and Renee Blair)	2021	—	—	—	—	—	—	—	—	—	—		Non-album single
"—" denotes releases that did not chart or were not released in that territory.

== Other charted songs ==
List of songs, with selected chart positions, showing year released and album name
Title	Year	Peak chart positions					Album
Title	Year	US Pop Dig.	US R&B/HH Bub.	US R&B/HH Dig.	US Rap Dig.	US World Dig.	Album
"Million Dollar Dream" (A. R. Rahman featuring Iggy Azalea)	2014	—	—	—	—	17	Million Dollar Arm
"Heavy Crown" (featuring Ellie Goulding)	2014	—	9	37	23	—	Reclassified
"Kingdom Come" (Demi Lovato featuring Iggy Azalea)	2015	43	—	—	—	—	Confident
"—" denotes releases that did not chart or were not released in that territory.

== Guest appearances ==
List of guest appearances, with other performing artists, showing year released and album name
Title	Year	Other performer(s)	Album
"Raise Your Weapon"	2012	Stix, deadmau5	I Told U So
"I Think She Ready"	2012	FKi, Diplo	Transformers n the Hood
"Mo Flow"	2012	Skeme	Alive & Living
"Best Friend"	2012	B.o.B, Mac Miller	Fuck 'Em We Ball
"Light as a Feather"	2012	Katy B, Diplo	Danger EP
"Boss Lady"	2012	None	Woman On Top
"Hustle Gang"	2012	Chip, T.I.	London Boy
"Chasin Me"	2013	T.I., Young Dro, Kris Stephens	G.D.O.D. (Get Dough or Die)
"Otis (Remix)"	2013	Angel Haze	None
"High Level"	2013	Skeme	Ingleworld
"Wickedest Style"	2013	Sean Paul	Full Frequency
"Hell You Sayin'"	2014	T.I., Young Dro, Travis Scott	SXEW (South by East West)
"I'm Coming Out (The Other Woman Remix)"	2014	Keyshia Cole	None
"Million Dollar Dream"	2014	A. R. Rahman	Million Dollar Arm
"Acting Like That"	2014	Jennifer Lopez	A.K.A.
"He Ain't Goin' Nowhere"	2014	Jennifer Hudson	JHUD
"We Go Hard"	2014	T.I., Spodee	G.D.O.D. II
"G.U.N.S."	2015	Sauce Lord Rich	Know Me
"Kingdom Come"	2015	Demi Lovato	Confident
"Tonight (It's a Party)"	2016	Stephen Marley, DJ Khaled, Waka Flocka Flame	Revelation Pt. II: "The Fruit of Life"
"Can't Lose"	2017	Lil Uzi Vert	Def Jam Presents: Direct Deposit, Vol. 2
"Boom Boom"	2017	Zedd	Pitch Perfect 3: Original Motion Picture Soundtrack
"In a Haze (Remix)"	2018	Total Ape	In a Haze
"Cum"	2019	Brooke Candy	Sexorcism
"Murcielago"	2021	Didi J, Azia	Cover Girl

== See also ==
- Iggy Azalea videography
- List of songs recorded by Iggy Azalea
- List of Australian hip hop musicians
- Australian hip hop
