= Iggy Azalea videography =

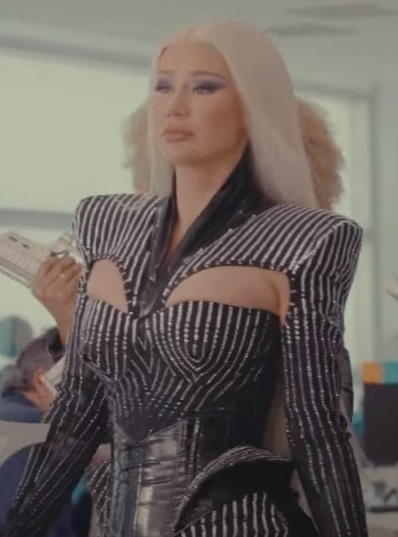
Behind the scenes of Azalea's "Money Come" music video in 2023

Australian rapper Iggy Azalea has been featured in twenty-one music videos (including thirteen as a lead artist and five as a featured artist), one film, among various appearances in other audiovisual productions. In 2011, Azalea uploaded on YouTube her debut music video for "Pu$$y," a song from her debut mixtape, Ignorant Art, where it subsequently went viral, helping to propel the rapper to prominence, after previously sharing home videos as an underground rapper. She released two more videos from the project in following months, "My World" and "The Last Song." In 2012, she aligned herself with Southern rapper T.I.'s Grand Hustle imprint. He was then featured on "Murda Bizness," taken from her Glory EP, also appearing in the visuals, marking the beginning of multiple collaborations between the two. Around this time, Azalea made her debut appearance on American television at the 2012 BET Hip Hop Awards alongside other Grand Hustle label-mates. Azalea announced she would be releasing a second mixtape titled TrapGold by premiering a video for the track "Bac 2 Tha Future (My Time)." She was a guest performer on VH1 Divas 2012.

In 2013, Azalea signed a record deal with Virgin EMI and Def Jam, while readying the release of her debut album, The New Classic. The video for the first single, "Work," which depicts Azalea's biographical journey from life on the streets to Hollywood after she relocated from Australia to the United States to pursue a rap career, received praise from critics and was nominated for the MTV Video Music Award for Best New Artist. "Bounce," the second single, shot in Mumbai sparked discussion on the representation of Indian style and culture. The video for the third single "Change Your Life," featuring T.I., premiered later that year. Azalea also started making other television appearances and performances to promote the releases.

Azalea released "Fancy," featuring Charli XCX, in 2014, its visuals being a remake of the 1995 film Clueless, achieving success worldwide and earning her more mainstream attention, including four 2014 MTV Video Music Awards nominations and an appearance on Saturday Night Live. After the album release, the video for "Black Widow," featuring Rita Ora, premiered receiving comparisons to Quentin Tarantino's 2003 film Kill Bill, with actor Michael Madsen also starring in it, and was nominated for Best Video at the 2014 MTV Europe Music Awards. Azalea also hosted the revived House of Style series on MTV.com. She featured in singles by other artists that year, such as Ariana Grande's "Problem" and Jennifer Lopez's "Booty," appearing in the respective videos. A video for "Trouble," featuring Jennifer Hudson, from the re-release of her debut album, Reclassified, was premiered on Vevo as well. Azalea co-directed the video of her Britney Spears-collaborative single, "Pretty Girls," in 2015, marking the third time she was officially credited as a director, after her work on "Black Widow" and "Trouble" with Director X. She made her film debut in Furious 7 (2015). After that, Azalea released a series of standalone singles with accompanying music videos and an EP titled Survive the Summer in 2018.

Iggy Azalea has accumulated 4.2 billion (7 billion together with other collaborators) views on her YouTube channel and 15 of her music videos are Vevo 100 million views certified, and 2 music videos have more than 1 billion views ("Fancy" with Charli XCX & "Problem" with Ariana Grande).

== Music videos ==
=== As a performer ===
==== As lead artist ====
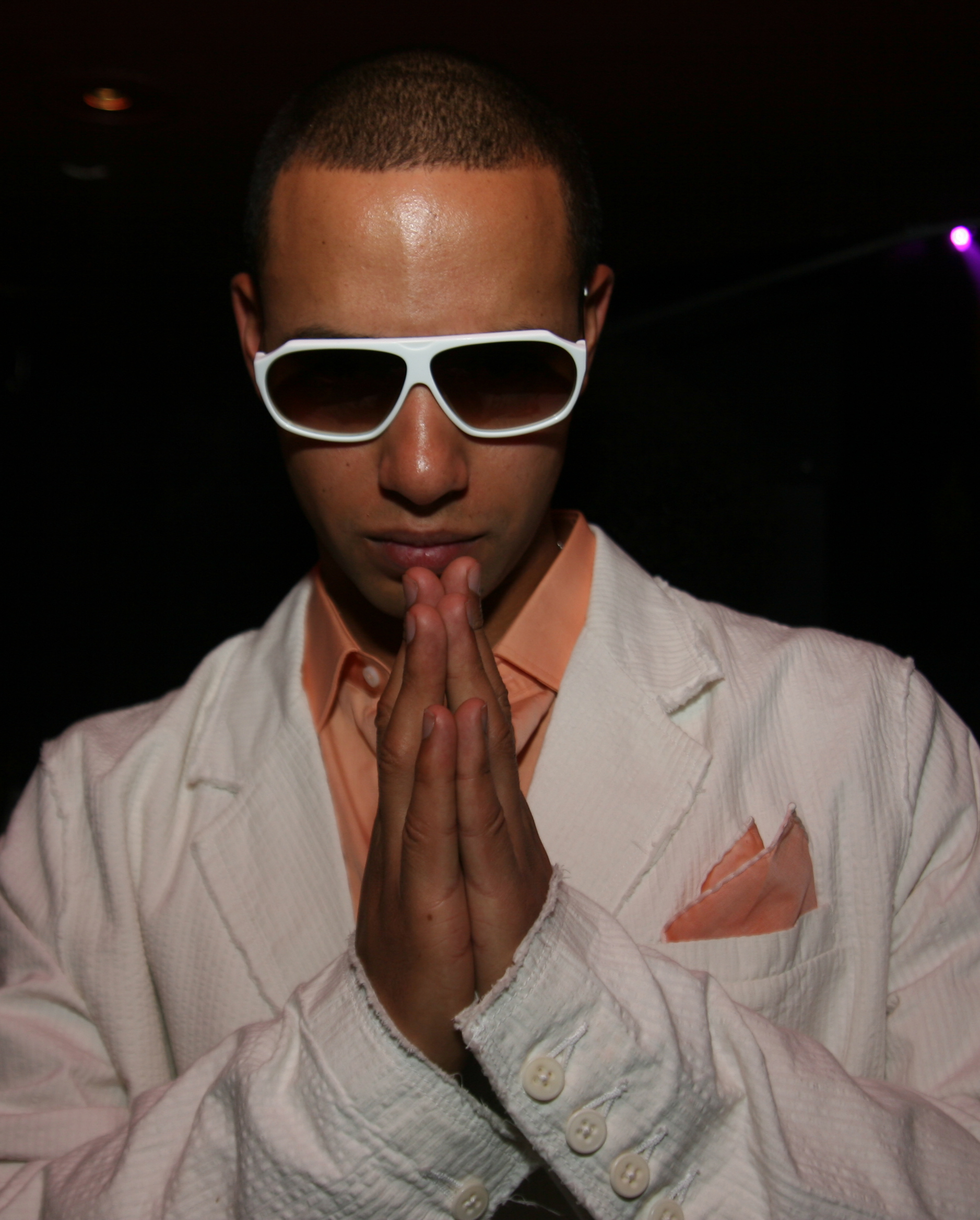
Director X (pictured) co-directed the "Black Widow" (2014) and "Trouble" (2015) music videos with Azalea.

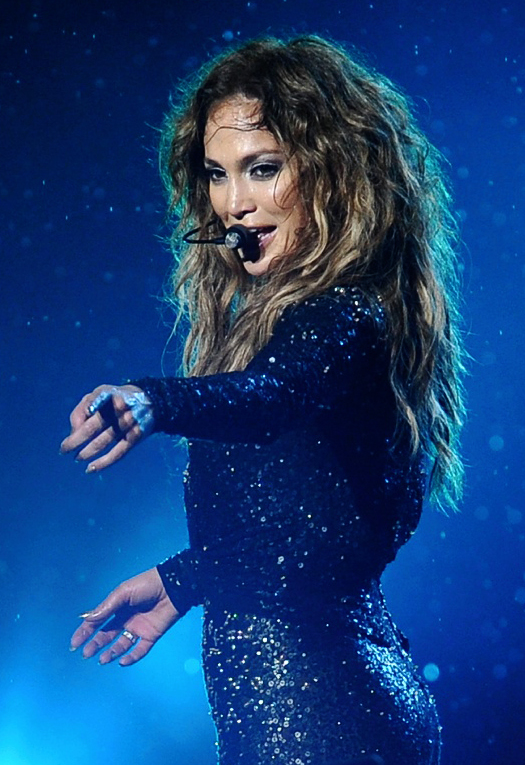
Azalea is featured on the remix of Jennifer Lopez's (pictured) 2014 song "Booty" and also appears in the music video.

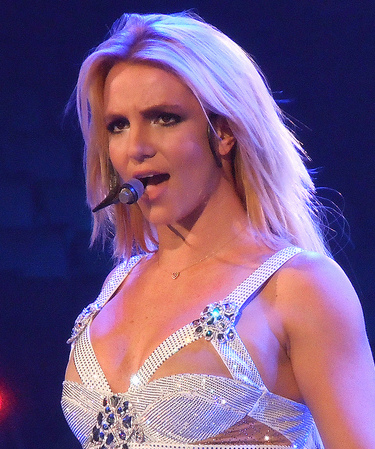
Azalea directed the video of her collaboration with Britney Spears (pictured), "Pretty Girls," in 2015.

List of music videos as lead artist, showing other performer(s), director(s), album and year released
Title	Other performer(s)	Director(s)	Album	Year	Ref.
"Pu$$y" (Note: Two versions of the video were uploaded online, Azalea's original "leak" and the producer's final cut with additional post-production.)	None	Falkon	Ignorant Art	2011	
"My World"	None	Alex/2Tone	Ignorant Art	2011	
"The Last Song"	None	Bell Soto	Ignorant Art	2012	
"Murda Bizness"	T.I.	3 Little Digs (Note: 3 Little Digs directed the "Murda Bizness" in-studio video version featuring Azalea, T.I. and Chip.)	Glory	2012	
"Murda Bizness"	T.I.	Alex/2Tone	Glory	2012	
"Bac 2 Tha Future (My Time)"	None	Bell Soto	TrapGold	2012	
"Work"	None	Jonas & François	The New Classic	2013	
"Slo."	None	Rankin	TrapGold	2013	
"Bounce"	None	BRTHR	The New Classic	2013	
"Change Your Life"	T.I.	Jonas & François	The New Classic	2013	
"Fancy"	Charli XCX	Director X	The New Classic	2014	
"Black Widow"	Rita Ora	Director X Iggy Azalea	The New Classic	2014	
"Trouble"	Jennifer Hudson	Director X Iggy Azalea	Reclassified	2015	
"Pretty Girls"	Britney Spears	Cameron Duddy; Iggy Azalea	None	2015	
"Team"	None	Fabien Montique	None	2016	
"Mo Bounce"	None	Lil Internet	None	2017	
"Switch" (Note: The "Switch" music video was not officially released.)	Anitta	Thom Kerr (Note: Kerr directed the "Savior" lyric video.)	None	2017	
"Savior"	Quavo	Thom Kerr	None	2018	
"Savior"	Quavo	Colin Tilley	None	2018	
"Kream"	Tyga	Colin Tilley	Survive the Summer	2018	
"Sally Walker"	None	Colin Tilley	In My Defense	2019	
"Started"	None	Colin Tilley	In My Defense	2019	
"Fuck It Up"	Kash Doll	Colin Tilley	In My Defense	2019	
"Lola"	Alice Chater	Thom Kerr; Iggy Azalea	Wicked Lips	2019	
"Dance Like Nobody's Watching" (Lyric video)	Tinashe	Thom Kerr; Iggy Azalea	The End of an Era	2020	
"Sip It"	Tyga	Thom Kerr; Iggy Azalea	The End of an Era	2021	
"Brazil" (Visualizer)	None		The End of an Era	2021	
"I Am The Stripclub"	None	Thom Kerr Iggy Azalea	The End of an Era	2021	
"Money Come"	None	Christian Breslauer Iggy Azalea	None	2023	

==== As featured artist ====
List of music videos as featured artist, showing other performer(s), director(s), album and year released
Title	Other performer(s)	Director(s)	Album	Year	Ref.
"I Think She Ready"	FKi; Diplo	Alex/2Tone	Transformers n the Hood	2012	
"Beat Down"	Steve Aoki; Angger Dimas	Alex/2Tone	Wonderland (Remixed)	2012	
"Problem"	Ariana Grande	Jones Crow (Note: Crow directed the "Problem" lyric video featuring Grande and Azalea.)	My Everything	2014	
"Problem"	Ariana Grande	Nev Todorovic	My Everything	2014	
"No Mediocre"	T.I.	Director X	Paperwork	2014	
"Booty"	Jennifer Lopez	Hype Williams	None	2014	
"Pretty Girls"	Britney Spears	Cameron Duddy Iggy Azalea	None	2015	

=== Cameo appearances ===
List of cameo appearances in music videos, showing performer(s), director(s), album and year released
Title	Performer(s)	Director(s)	Album	Year	Ref.
"Otis" (Remix)	YG; Reem Riches	Kenneth Wynn	None	2011	
"Hot Wheels"	T.I. Travis Porter; Young Dro	Alex Smith	F*ck Da City Up	2012	
"Mr. Taxi" (Remix)	Steve Aoki	Punit Dhesi	None	2012	

== Filmography ==
List of films, showing year released, role, director(s) and selected notes
Title	Year	Role	Director(s)	Notes	Ref.
Furious 7	2015	Female Racer	James Wan	Cameo appearance	

== Television ==
=== Appearances as herself ===
List of television shows, showing appearance year, channel and selected notes
Title	Year	Channel	Notes	Ref.
Tracks	2012	Arte	Mini-documentary	
Iggy Azalea's Hottest Club Joints	2013	4Music	Host; special countdown	
The Show with Vinny	2013	MTV	Episode #1.9	
MTV News	2013	MTV	Interviewer; World War Z Premiere Segment	
Never Mind the Buzzcocks	2013	BBC Two	Competitor; Episode #27.4	
MTV Video Music Awards	2013	MTV	Presenter	
MOBO Awards	2013	BBC Three	Presenter	
MTV Europe Music Awards	2013	MTV	Presenter	
Studio 10	2013	Network Ten	Episode "13 November 2013"	
MTV Movie Awards	2014	MTV	Presenter	
This Is Hot 97	2014	VH1	Episode #1.8: "The Turn Up"	
Jimmy Kimmel Live!	2014	ABC	Skit: "New Lyrics for Old People"; Episode #12.73	
Billboard Music Awards	2014	ABC	Presenter	
Chelsea Lately	2014	E!	Episode #8.79	
Dave Skylark's Very Special VMA Special	2014	MTV	Guest Interview	
Saturday Night Live	2014	NBC	Skit: "Halloween Party"; Episode #40.4: "Jim Carrey/Iggy Azalea"	
Today	2015	Nine Network	Episode "17 June 2015"	
The Late Late Show with James Corden	2015	CBS	Carpool Karaoke; Episode #1.46	
Lip Sync Battle	2015	Spike	Competitor; Episode #1.16: "Iggy Azalea vs. Nick Young"	
Today	2015	Nine Network	Episode "19 August 2015"	
The Project	2015	Network Ten	Episode "19 August 2015"	
Good Morning America	2016	ABC	Episode "23 March 2016"	
Watch What Happens Live	2016	Bravo	Episode "23 March 2016"	
The Ellen DeGeneres Show	2016	CBS	Episode "8 April 2016"	
Late Night with Seth Meyers	2016	NBC	Episode "28 April 2016"	
Wild 'n Out	2016	MTV	Competitor; Episode #8.2: "Iggy Azalea/Travis Mills"	
The X Factor Australia	2016	Seven Network	Judge; Season 8	
Extra	2017	Syndicated	Universal Studios interview; Episode "22 May 2017"	
Watch What Happens Live	2017	Bravo	Episode "21 May 2017"	
The Late Late Show with James Corden	2017	CBS	Flinch; Episode #3.125	
Premios Juventud	2017	Univision	Presenter	
Dare to Live	2017	MTV	Episode #1.5	
Total Request Live	2018	MTV	Episode "15 February 2018"	
Hollywood Medium	2018	E!	Episode "14 March 2018"	
Watch What Happens Live	2018	Bravo	Episode "18 March 2018"	
Extra	2018	Syndicated	Universal Studios interview; Episode "11 July 2018"	
Access Live	2018	Syndicated	Episode "11 July 2018"	
Hip-Hop Houdini	2018	Fuse	Episode #1.3	
iHeartRadio Music Festival	2018	The CW	Presenter	
Overserved with Lisa Vanderpump	2021	E!	Episode #1.3	
The Celebrity Dating Game	2021	ABC	Episode #1.2	

=== As a performer ===
List of television shows, showing performance year, channel and performed song(s)
Title	Year	Channel	Performed song(s)	Ref.
BET Hip Hop Awards	2012	BET	Grand Hustle Cypher (with T.I., B.o.B, Chip and Trae tha Truth)	
VH1 Divas	2012	VH1	"Groove Is in the Heart" (with Natasha Bedingfield and Bootsy Collins)	
Britain & Ireland's Next Top Model	2013	Sky Living	"Work"	
The Sound of Change Live	2013	NBC	"Work"; "Bounce"	
Nikki & Sara Live	2013	MTV	"Work"	
Smells Like Friday Night	2013	Channel 4	"Bounce"	
106 & Park	2013	BET	"Change Your Life" (with T.I.)	
Trending 10	2013	Fuse	"Change Your Life"	
Alan Carr: Chatty Man	2013	Channel 4	"Change Your Life"	
MOBO Awards	2013	BBC Three	"Change Your Life"; "Work"	
Wake Up	2013	Network Ten	"Change Your Life"	
MTV Europe Music Awards	2013	MTV	"Blurred Lines" (with Robin Thicke)	
The Late Show with David Letterman	2013	CBS	"Change Your Life" (with T.I.)	
mtvU Woodie Awards	2014	mtvU	"Fancy" (with Charli XCX)	
Late Night with Seth Meyers	2014	NBC	"Fancy" (with Charli XCX)	
Good Morning America	2014	ABC	"Fancy" (with Charli XCX)	
Jimmy Kimmel Live!	2014	ABC	"Fancy" (with Charli XCX)	
Billboard Music Awards	2014	ABC	"Fancy" (with Charli XCX); "Problem" (with Ariana Grande)	
Dancing with the Stars	2014	ABC	"Fancy" (with Charli XCX)	
BET Awards	2014	BET	"No Mediocre" (with T.I.); "Fancy"	
ESPY Awards	2014	ESPN	"Fancy"	
iHeartRadio Ultimate Pool Party	2014	The CW	"Bounce"; "Work"; "Fancy"; "Problem" (with Ariana Grande)	
The Today Show	2014	NBC	"Work"; "Fancy"	
MTV Video Music Awards	2014	MTV	"Black Widow" (with Rita Ora)	
The Ellen DeGeneres Show	2014	CBS	"Black Widow" (with Rita Ora)	
Saturday Night Live	2014	NBC	"Fancy"; "Black Widow" (with Rita Ora); "Beg for It" (with MØ)	
American Music Awards	2014	ABC	"Fancy" (with Charli XCX); "Beg for It"; "Booty" (with Jennifer Lopez)	
The Tonight Show Starring Jimmy Fallon	2014	NBC	"Beg for It"	
Dick Clark's New Year's Rockin' Eve with Ryan Seacrest	2014	ABC	"Fancy" (with Charli XCX)	
People's Choice Awards	2015	CBS	"Beg for It"	
The Tonight Show Starring Jimmy Fallon	2015	NBC	"Trouble" (with Jennifer Hudson)	
Nickelodeon Kids' Choice Awards	2015	Nickelodeon	"Trouble" (with Jennifer Hudson)	
iHeartRadio Music Awards	2015	NBC	"Trouble" (with Jennifer Hudson)	
American Idol	2015	Fox	"Trouble" (with Jennifer Hudson)	
Billboard Music Awards	2015	ABC	"Pretty Girls" (with Britney Spears)	
MTV Video Music Awards	2015	MTV	"Cool for the Summer" (with Demi Lovato)	
The Tonight Show Starring Jimmy Fallon	2016	NBC	"Team"	
iHeartRadio Music Awards	2016	TBS	"Team"	
The Ellen DeGeneres Show	2016	CBS	"Team"	
Late Night with Seth Meyers	2016	NBC	"Team"	
Good Morning America	2016	ABC	"Team"; "Black Widow"; "Fancy"	
Wild 'n Out	2016	MTV	"Team"	
The Tonight Show Starring Jimmy Fallon	2017	NBC	"Switch" (with Anitta)	
MTV Millennial Awards	2017	MTV Latin	"Mo Bounce"; "Switch"	
The Late Late Show with James Corden	2017	CBS	"Switch"	
iHeartRadio Much Music Video Awards	2017	Much	"Switch"	
Premios Juventud	2017	Univision	"Switch"	
The Late Late Show with James Corden	2018	CBS	"Savior"	
Jimmy Kimmel Live!	2019	ABC	"Sally Walker"	
International Music Award	2019	P7S1	"Lola" (with Alice Chater)	

== Web ==
List of web appearances, showing year, streaming service and selected notes
Title	Year	Service	Notes	Ref.
GGN: Snoop Dogg's Double G News Network	2011	YouTube	Holiday special	
Close To!	2012	Ofive.tv (Play TV)	Mini-documentary	
Vevo Lift	2013	Vevo	Campaign; web series	
House of Style	2014	MTV.com	Host; web series	
Vevo Certified SuperFanFest	2014	Vevo	Performer	
73 Questions	2015	Vogue	Web series interview	
TIDAL X: Mercedes Iggy Azalea	2017	Tidal	Performer	
TIDAL X Brooklyn	2017	Tidal	Performer	
Iggy Azalea Explains Her Instagram Photos	2018	Vanity Fair	Web series	
Droppin' Cash: Los Angeles	2018	Complex	Web series	
ET Live	2018	Entertainment Tonight	Web series	
PEOPLE Now	2018	People	Web series	
BUILD Series NYC	2019	AOL	Web series	
Get Ready With Me	2019	Vogue Paris	Web series	
RuPaul	2019	WOW Presents	Web series	
The X Change Rate	2019	Build Series	Web series	
Fan Vs Artist Trivia	2019	iHeartRadio	Episode: "Iggy Azalea Goes Head to Head With Her Biggest Fan"	
Expensive Taste Test	2019	Cosmopolitan	Episode: "Iggy Azalea Has Fancy Taste and Isn't Sorry About It"	
Disgustingly Healthy	2019	Men's Health	Episode: "Iggy Azalea Eats Kangaroo and Talks New Playboi Carti Album"	
Suck It Up	2019	Delish	Episode: "Iggy Azalea Doesn’t Give A F*ck About Being A Troll During This Sour Candy Challenge"	
Wired Autocomplete Interview	2024	Wired	Episode: "Iggy Azalea Answers The Web’s Most Searched Questions"	
Most Prized Possessions	2024	InStyle	Episode: "Iggy Azalea's Most Prized Possessions"	
Know Their Lyrics	2024	Variety	Episode: "Does Iggy Azalea Know the Lyrics to Her Most Famous Songs?"	

== Commercials ==
List of commercials, showing company, campaign, year and director(s)
Company	Campaign	Year	Director(s)	Ref.
Adidas	Unite All Originals	2013	Colin Solal Cardo	
Samsung	Milk Music	2014	Warren Fu	
Forever 21	Unwrap Style	2014	—N/a	
Bonds	BONDS100	2015	—N/a	
Monster Products	Super Bowl LII	2018	Bjorn Ruhmann	
Postmates	IGGY100	2018	—N/a	
OnlyFans	Hotter Than Hell	2023	Josh Farias; Sam Brave	
