= Survive the Summer =

2018 EP by Iggy Azalea

EP by Iggy Azalea
- Released: 3 August 2018
- Recorded: September 2017
- Length: 15:53
- Label: Island
- Producers: Bedrock; Ronny J; Wallis Lane; Ljay Currie; Smash David

Iggy Azalea chronology
Reclassified (2014)	Survive the Summer (2018)	In My Defense (2019)

Singles from Survive the Summer
- 1. "Kream" Released: 6 July 2018

Survive the Summer is the fourth extended play (EP) by Australian rapper Iggy Azalea. It was released on 3 August 2018 by Island Records, and is her first album since Reclassified (2014), a reissue of her debut studio album The New Classic (2014). Recorded in September 2017, the EP contains production from Bedrock, Ronny J, Wallis Lane, Ljay Currie and Smash David, and features guest appearances from American rappers Tyga and Wiz Khalifa.

Survive The Summer was supported by two singles; the lead single "Kream" (featuring Tyga), as well as the promotional single "Tokyo Snow Trip". Both were released on 6 July 2018. "Kream" has since been certified Platinum by the Recording Industry Association of America (RIAA) and became Azalea's first track to enter the US Billboard Hot 100 in over three years, peaking at number 96 on the chart. The song also topped the Bubbling Under R&B/Hip-Hop Singles chart.

The EP, as well as its lead single, was classified as a commercial comeback for Azalea. In Australia, Survive the Summer debuted inside the top 20 on the ARIA Top 50 Digital Albums Chart (Azalea's home country). In the United States, the EP charted at the lower end of the chart on the Billboard 200 dated 18 August 2018 with 6,000 units, marking Azalea's third entry on the chart. It peaked at number 13 on Billboard's Digital Albums chart in the same week, her second highest position on the chart and also third entry overall.

== Background ==
In November 2014, a reissue of Azalea's debut studio album The New Classic (2014), titled Reclassified, was released; it featured five new songs, including two singles — "Beg for It" and "Trouble". In December, she announced plans of a tour through her Twitter account called the Great Escape Tour, stating that in addition to The New Classic, her then-upcoming second studio album would be promoted on the tour. It was later announced the tour would be postponed to the fall, before it was officially canceled in May 2015.

In January 2015, Azalea announced that she had started working on her second studio album. In October, she announced that it would be called Digital Distortion and that it was set for release in the following year. On 8 January 2016, the buzz single "Azillion" was released on SoundCloud. After leaving her record label, UK-based Virgin EMI, Azalea decided to permanently switch to her US-based record label, Def Jam. She then previewed the lenticular cover art for the album.

On 18 March 2016, the intended lead single from Digital Distortion, "Team", was released. In September, she explained she was delaying the release of the album to 2017 after experiencing personal setbacks. On 3 March 2017, the promotional single "Can't Lose" was released. On 24 March, "Mo Bounce" was released as the intended second single. Following the release, Azalea confirmed the scrapping of all 2016 material, as well as songs that included collaborations with YG, Lil Uzi Vert, and Jeremih. She also said the album would still include the songs "Elephant" featuring YG, "Team", and "Mo Bounce". On 19 May 2017, "Switch", featuring Brazilian singer Anitta, was released.

After "Switch" failed to make a commercial impact, as well as its music video being leaked, Azalea stated Def Jam had stopped promotion for Digital Distortion. Later in 2017, Azalea announced Digital Distortion would be released on 30 July 2017, until conflict between her and then-CEO of Def Jam, Steve Bartels, involving the promotion of further singles including the collaboration with Azealia Banks, and the delay of the album, lead to the album being pushed back further. Azalea expressed her frustration and disappointment at the delays on social media, later announcing on Twitter the album had no official release date. After Digital Distortion was delayed further and eventually cancelled, Azalea left Def Jam and signed with Island Records.

On 2 February 2018, Azalea released the single "Savior". The single was promoted during the Super Bowl on 4 February 2018. The single "Savior" did not make it to the tracklist of Survive the Summer, because it did not fit the theme of the EP. In an interview with iHeartRadio, she emphasized the song's lyrics being written at a time during her breakup with NBA basketball player Nick Young, and her career she "was used to [...] had abruptly stopped". On 6 July 2018, "Kream" was released as the first single, along with the promotional single, "Tokyo Snow Trip". On 3 August 2018, Survive the Summer was released for digital download and streaming worldwide.

== Artwork ==
Azalea shared on 24 December 2017, that the album cover will feature only three letters, "S.T.S", which is the album title's abbreviation. She revealed the cover art via Instagram on 29 June 2018. Described by Rap-Up as "dark and provocative", it finds Azalea bathed under red lights while dressed in a netted bodysuit and lace mask, as two hands grab her breasts. A single white rose is placed between her hands. When asked about its symbolism, she answered saying: "Mourning, death. Like throwing a flower into a casket and saying goodbye to something."

== Promotion ==
On 2 September 2017, Azalea posted a snippet of a new song on Twitter with the hashtag "#STS". On 7 November, she officially cancelled Digital Distortion and announced she would release a new project titled Surviving the Summer, after severe creative differences. She also revealed that the album would be released by a new label and new management, following her departure from Def Jam. On 10 December, Azalea posted two new snippets of a song from the album. On 2 February 2018, "Savior" featuring American rapper Quavo was released as the lead single from the album, but was later cut from the tracklist and turned into a buzz single. On 27 April, Azalea announced Surviving the Summer would be a visual extended play instead of an album, which means that every song of it will be accompanied by visuals. Originally set to be released on 2 June before switching to 30 June and then to 6 July, Azalea announced on 8 June that the EP was pushed back again to 3 August. According to her, the release date was postponed because her "record label, Island Records, is changing presidents," and that she has "to allow time for everyone in the company to re-organise". On 6 July, the album was made available for pre-order as Survive the Summer, along with the release of the lead single "Kream" featuring American rapper Tyga and the promotional single "Tokyo Snow Trip".

In attempt to further promote the EP, Azalea planned a 21-city North American Bad Girls Tour at the end of 2018 with support from Cupcakke and Megan Thee Stallion. Initially, CupcakKe announced in October 2018 via Twitter she would no longer be a part of the tour due to the management of the tour paying her $30,000 of the intended $330,000 she was originally promised. Cupcakke further explained the disorganization of the tour, and stated it did not have to do with Iggy Azalea, but her management. Live Nation announced days after the tour was cancelled and Ticketmaster refunded tickets.

== Critical reception ==
Professional ratings
Review scores
Source	Rating
AllMusic	3/5 stars
Pitchfork	4.3/10
Slant	2.5/5 stars

Survive The Summer received generally mixed reviews by the music critics, Neil Yeung of AllMusic said the EP "presents Azalea as a hardcore rapper with little desire to court the mainstream, which was once her bread and butter," continuing that, "her flow is effective and the production pops, but it's just not as enjoyable with the fun sucked out of it." The tracks "Tokyo Snow Trip" and "Kawasaki" were noted as the editor picks. Sheldon Pearce of Pitchfork described Survive the Summer's influence of hip-hop, "she knows what a good rap song should sound like in the abstract, but she is incapable of making one". Vulture praises the EP's concept as "an interesting choice aesthetically", though "S.T.S. aims for sparseness but sometimes comes out feeling palpably empty". Mike Nied from Idolator named the EP as one of the rapper's most consistent offerings, stating, "There is none of the shimmering pop aesthetic that helped her top the Billboard Hot 100 with 'Fancy' in 2014. However, she is just as alluring without the supersized hooks and singalong choruses that defined some of her biggest hits." Writing for Stereogum, Chris DeVille remarked, "The dark trap beats are sufficiently booming; Azalea's rhymes are confident and charismatic despite also ranging from uninspired," and declared that "it’s hard to imagine her returning to full bloom, but for better or worse Azalea seems poised to endure into autumn and beyond." In a review for Slant Magazine, Alexa Camp characterized Survive the Summer as "consistent to a fault, laser-focused both sonically and thematically, abandoning the groove centricity of singles like the slept-on banger 'Mo Bounce' and the recent 'Savior'", adding that "all six songs are uniformly dark, weird, and minimalist, with stark verses filled almost exclusively with assertions about Azalea's figurative and literal assets." Writing for HotNewHipHop, Mitch Findlay considered the track "OMG" a highlight which "finds Azalea at her most confident, spitting at a level that may garner secret appreciation not unlike a guilty pleasure."

== Commercial performance ==
In Australia, Survive the Summer debuted at number 17 on the ARIA Top 50 Digital Albums Chart for the week commencing on 13 August 2018. In the United States, the EP charted at number 144 on the Billboard 200 dated 18 August 2018 with 6,000 units, marking Azalea's third entry on the chart, and first new arrival on that list since 2014. It peaked at number 13 on Billboard's Digital Albums chart in the same week, her second highest position on the chart and also third entry overall.

As of January 2022, the project has generated over 305M views on YouTube, 212M streams on Spotify, and 11M on SoundCloud through Azalea's official accounts.

== Track listing ==
Survive the Summer
No.	Title	Writer(s)	Producer(s)	Length
1.	"Survive the Summer"	Amethyst Kelly	Ljay Currie	2:44
2.	"Tokyo Snow Trip"	Kelly	Bedrock	2:10
3.	"Kream" (featuring Tyga)	Kelly; Ronald Spence Jr.; Nima Jahanbin; Paimon Jahanbin; Michael Stevenson; Gary Grice; Corey Woods; David Porter; Robert Diggs; Lamont Hawkins; Isaac Hayes; Clifford Smith; Dennis Coles; Russell Jones; Jason Hunter	Ronny J; Wallis Lane; GT^{[a]}	2:46
4.	"Hey Iggy"	Kelly; Michael Donald Chapman; Dylan Wiggins; Nicholas Chinn	Bedrock	2:47
5.	"Kawasaki"	Kelly	Bedrock	2:57
6.	"OMG" (featuring Wiz Khalifa)	Kelly; Rodriguez Kirkland Matthew; Akil King; Cameron Thomaz	Smash David	2:29
Total length:				15:53

Notes

- ^{^[a]} signifies a co-producer.

Sample credits

- "Kream" contains elements of "C.R.E.A.M.", written by Robert Diggs, Jason Hunter, Clifford Smith, and Corey Woods, as performed by Wu-Tang Clan.

== Personnel ==
Credits adapted from Tidal.

=== Performance ===
- Iggy Azalea – lead vocals
- Tyga – featured vocals (track 3)
- Wiz Khalifa – featured vocals (track 6)

=== Production ===
- Eric Weaver – production (tracks 1, 5–6), vocal production (track 1, 5–6)
- Ljay Currie – production (track 1)
- Bedrock – production (tracks 2, 4–5)
- Ronny J – production (track 3)
- Wallis Lane – production (track 3)
- Smash David – production (track 6)
- GT – co-production (track 3)

=== Technical ===
- Eric Weaver – engineering (tracks 1–2, 4–6)
- Christian "CQ" Quinonez – engineering (tracks 2–5)
- Jaycen Joshua – mixing (tracks 1–5)
- Mike Seaberg – mixing assistance (all tracks)
- Jacob Richards – mixing assistance (all tracks)
- Rashawn Mclean – mixing assistance (all tracks)

== Charts ==
Chart (2018)	Peak position
Australia Digital Albums (ARIA)	17
US Billboard 200	144

== Release history ==
Region	Date	Format(s)	Label	Ref.
Various	3 August 2018	Digital download; streaming	Island	
