= You Thought Wrong =

You Thought Wrong may refer to:

- "You Thought Wrong", a song by Kelly Clarkson featuring Tamyra Gray from the 2003 album Thankful
- "You Thought Wrong", a song by Tory Lanez from the 2018 album Love Me Now?
