= Talk to Me (Tory Lanez and Rich the Kid song) =

Single by Tory Lanez and Rich the Kid

from the album Love Me Now?
- Released: June 21, 2018
- Genre: Hip hop • R&B
- Length: 3:04
- Label: Mad Love; Interscope
- Songwriters: Daystar Peterson; Dimitri Roger; Samuel Jimenez; Barrington Wright; Tavarez
- Producers: Smash David; Rekless

Tory Lanez singles chronology
"Pa Mí" (2018)	"Talk to Me" (2018)	"Keep in Touch" (2018)

Rich the Kid singles chronology
"Leave Me" (2018)	"Talk to Me" (2018)	"Ring Ring" (2018)

Music video
- "Talk to Me" on YouTube

"Talk to Me" is a song by Canadian singer Tory Lanez and American rapper Rich the Kid. Mad Love Records and Interscope Records released it as the lead single from Lanez's third studio album, Love Me Now? (2018), on June 21, 2018.

== Music video ==
The music video for "Talk To Me" premiered on Lanez' YouTube channel on July 17, 2018. The "vibrant" video features a stationery camera rotating through multi-colored rooms with performers Rich the Kid, Lanez, and a visual cameo from New York rapper 6ix9ine.

== Chart performance ==
"Talk to Me" debuted at number 76 on the US Billboard Hot 100 chart the week of November 10, 2018. On the week of January 12, 2019, the single reached its peak position at number 43 on the chart. The single spent a total of 16 weeks on the chart. On November 15, 2021, the single was certified double platinum by the Recording Industry Association of America (RIAA) for combined sales and streaming data of over two million units in the United States.

== Remix ==
Tory Lanez and Rich the Kid released a remix of the song featuring American rapper Lil Wayne and DJ Stevie J.

== Charts ==
=== Weekly charts ===
Chart (2018)	Peak position
Canada Hot 100 (Billboard)	55
US Billboard Hot 100	43
US Hot R&B/Hip-Hop Songs (Billboard)	18
US Rhythmic Airplay (Billboard)	25

=== Year-end charts ===
Chart (2019)	Position
US Hot R&B/Hip-Hop Songs (Billboard)	78

== Certifications ==
Region	Certification	Certified units/sales
United Kingdom (BPI)	Silver	200,000^{‡}
United States (RIAA)	2× Platinum	2,000,000^{‡}
^{‡} Sales+streaming figures based on certification alone.
