= Bobby Sessions =

American rapper

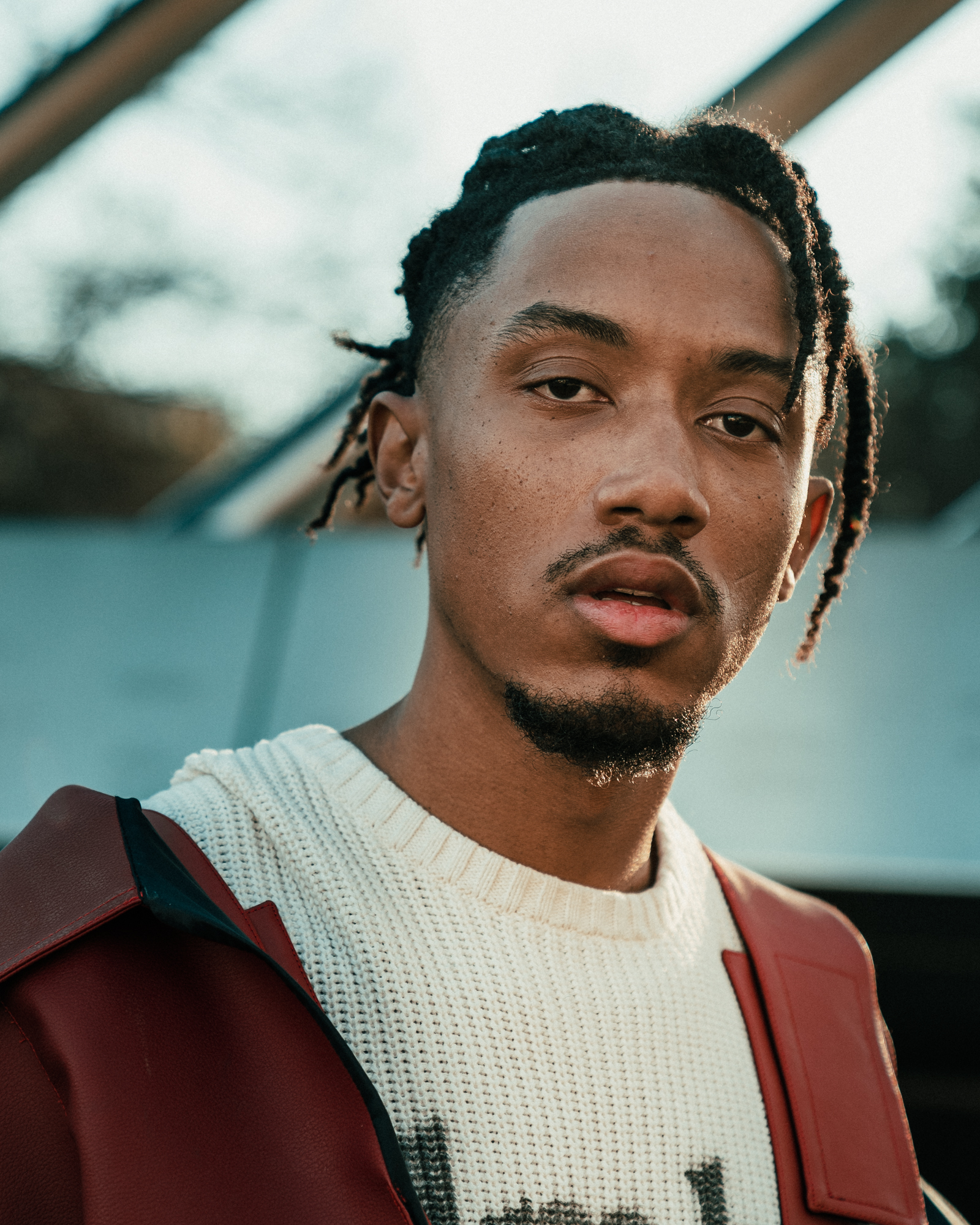
- Sessions in 2022

Background information
- Born: Bobby Dewayne Session, Jr. Dallas, Texas, U.S.
- Education: University of North Texas
- Genres: Southern hip-hop
- Occupations: Rapper; songwriter
- Years active: 2010–present
- Label: Def Jam
- Website: bobbysessionstx.com

Bobby Dewayne Session, Jr, known professionally as Bobby Sessions, is an American rapper. He wrote and performed the title track for the 2018 film, The Hate U Give, and signed with Def Jam Recordings that same year. He co-wrote Megan Thee Stallion's 2020 single, "Savage" (featuring Beyoncé), which won a Grammy Award and peaked atop the Billboard Hot 100.

In 2021, Sessions worked with Marvel Comics writers to create to outsource stories for Ta-Nehisi Coates' final three issues of Black Panther, with Sessions contributing to issue 24.

== Early life ==
Bobby Sessions was born and raised in Pleasant Grove, Dallas, Texas. He and his family relocated to Rowlett, a suburb northeast of Pleasant Grove. He began writing hip-hop songs as a teenager and would freestyle in class and in the locker room before football practice. His father's love of jazz and soul music greatly influenced his passion for music.

Sessions played basketball, football, and ran track, and has attributed to his competitive edge in his music career. Football played a large role in his youth. When asked about his stage name, Sessions said:

I got it from my father, because I'm a junior. It's my real name, the only difference is the added 's' at the end. I can tell somebody my name's Bobby Session a million times, they still say it back with an extra 's'. When I decided on my stage name, I did the work for them so they don't have to worry about it."

== Musical career ==
While attending the University of North Texas, where Sessions was studying philosophy and journalism, he began honing in on his rapping skills at the student led organization, Poetic Justice. He has cited Jay-Z, Eminem, Tupac, Kanye West, and Pharrell as his major influences.

He became active in the rap/hip-hop community performing with the Brain Gang (also known as The Rowdy Bunch) in Deep Ellum in Dallas, known for its music scene. The group sold-out venues and was known for its element of rage (punk rock style), mosh pits, and jumping. Sessions worked at Walmart and the U.S. Postal Service while playing in clubs in the Dallas area establishing a name for himself. He quit his job in 2014 with only $50 in his bank account to pursue his music career full-time.

In 2015, Sessions signed a record deal with High Standardz and released his debut album, LOA (Law of Attraction) which was listed as the "Best Album of 2015" by the Dallas Observer. His 2017 sophomore release, Grateful, earned him "Best Rap/Hip-Hop Act" at the Dallas Observer Music Awards as well as single Dollars & Sense winning "Best Rap Song".

In 2018, Session's manager, J Dot (Jeremy Jones), played early versions of Session's RVLTN Chapter 1: The Divided States of AmeriKKKa for the-then new CEO of Def Jam Recordings, Paul Rosenberg. Sessions was the first artist that Rosenburg signed. He wrote and performed the title track for the soundtrack, The Hate U Give, which includes songs by Kendrick Lamar, Pusha T, Logic, and Tupac. He was asked by his label to write the song as his cousin, James Harper, was shot and killed by a police officer in 2012 in South Dallas, Texas. 911 had received a call reporting an armed kidnapper which was later determined to be a hoax. The case was highly controversial as Harper was unarmed and shot three times. No charges were brought against the officer.

Sessions' involvement in Deep Ellum's (Dallas) music scene, community, and years of live performances was celebrated by a mural painting of him in Deep Ellum by artist JD Moore, commissioned by the Deep Ellum Foundation in 2019.

In 2020, Sessions' co-write Savage, co-written and performed by Megan Thee Stallion and Beyoncé, peaked at #1 on Billboard's Hot 100 chart which led to a publishing deal with Sony Music Publishing. Savage won a Grammy Award for Best Rap Song in 2021, was listed on the Rolling Stone's 500 Greatest Songs of All Time, and was certified 4× Platinum. Savage and Savage remix won awards for the Most Performed Songs of the Year at the 2021 BMI Rap/Hip-Hop Awards. Sessions teamed up with Stallion again on, Girls in the Hood, which peaked at #28 on Billboard's Hot 100 and was certified 2× Platinum. I'm a King (co-written and performed by Sessions and Stallion) was featured in the film, Coming 2 America, and released as the lead single on the film's soundtrack.

Additional collaborations include Sessions' co-write, Muwop, recorded by Latto (featuring Gucci Mane) which went platinum in 2022 as well as composing songs and being executive producer on Iggy Azalea's, 2021 album The End of an Era. Sessions released singles that featured artists such as Royce Da 5'9" on Still Alive, Rick Ross on Penthouse Prayers, and Benny the Butcher and Freddie Gibbs on Gold Rolex.

== Discography ==
Year	Album	Artist	Credit
2021	Penthouse Prayers (single)	Bobby Sessions (featuring Rick Ross)	Composer, primary artist
2021	Gold Rolex (single)	Bobby Sessions (featuring Benny the Butcher and Freddie Gibbs)	Composer, primary artist
2021	I'm a King (film and soundtrack Coming 2 America)	Bobby Sessions and Megan Thee Stallion	Composer, featured artist
2021	The End of an Era	Iggy Azalea	Composer, executive producer
2021	Black History Makers: Then & Now	Bobby Sessions	Composer, featured artist
2020	Manifest	Bobby Sessions	Composer, primary artist
2020	RVLTN, Chapter 3: The Price of Freedom	Bobby Sessions	Composer, primary artist
2020	Still Alive	Bobby Sessions (featuring Royce Da 5'9")	Composer, primary artist
2020	Savage (single)	Megan Thee Stallion	Composer
2020	Savage remix (single)	Megan Thee Stallion and Beyoncé	Composer
2020	Girls in the Hood (single)	Megan Thee Stallion	Composer
2020	Muwop (single)	Latto (featuring Gucci Mane)	Composer
2020	Immortal	Statik Selektah (featuring Bobby Sessions)	Composer, featured artist
2018	RVLTN, Chapter 1: The Divided States of AmeriKKKa	Bobby Sessions	Composer, primary artist
2018	The Hate U Give (film and soundtrack The Hate U Give)	Bobby Sessions	Composer, primary artist
2018	RVLTN, Chapter 2: The Art of Resistance	Bobby Sessions	Composer, primary artist
2017	Grateful	Bobby Sessions	Composer, primary artist
2015	LOA (Law of Attraction)	Bobby Sessions	Composer, primary artist
