= Sip It =

2021 single by Iggy Azalea and Tyga

Single by Iggy Azalea and Tyga

from the album The End of an Era (Deluxe)
- B-side: "Brazil"
- Released: 2 April 2021
- Genre: Hip hop
- Length: 3:15
- Label: Bad Dreams; Empire
- Songwriters: Amethyst Amelia Kelly; Michael Ray-Nguyen Stevenson; OG Parker
- Producers: Smash David; OG Parker

Iggy Azalea singles chronology
"Dance Like Nobody's Watching" (2020)	"Sip It" (2021)	"Brazil" (2021)

Tyga singles chronology
"Spicy (Remix)" (2021)	"Sip It" (2021)	"Splash" (2021)

Music video
- "Sip It" on YouTube

"Sip It" is a song by Australian rapper Iggy Azalea and American rapper Tyga, released on 2 April 2021, through Bad Dreams Records and Empire Distribution, with a music video released on the same day. It was intended to be the lead single from Azalea's third studio album The End of an Era (2021). Ending up being replaced by "Brazil" as the lead single, "Sip It" appears on the deluxe version of the album. The song samples Azalea's own song, "Pussy", and is her second collaboration with Tyga, following Azalea's 2018 single "Kream".

== Background and release ==
Azalea first posted a snippet of the song on her social media of her lip-syncing the lyrics, she then announced its release on 19 March 2021 along with the announcement of rapper Tyga being on the track. Azalea worked with producers OG Parker and Smash David and sampled her 2011 song "Pu$$y" in the song. The single was released on digital download and streaming platforms on 2 April 2021 as the lead single from Azalea's third studio album The End of an Era. The song refers to Azalea's "thirsty" private messages from male rappers. On her TikTok, she exposed celebrities' blurred thirsty messages sent to her, while she sang along to the song.

== Music video ==
The music video features a cameo from American rapper ppcocaine. Azalea works at a gas station convenience store where they serve their own psychedelic Slurpees called "Kitty Juice". Tyga drives in a red Corvette with the license plate "Kream 2.0", referencing their previous collaboration "Kream". The music video was filmed in a desert in California.

== Charts ==
Chart performance for "Sip It"
Chart (2021)	Peak position
New Zealand Hot Singles (RMNZ)	40
