= The End of an Era (album) =

- Standard edition cover

Studio album by Iggy Azalea
- Released: 13 August 2021
- Genre: Hip house
- Length: 39:27
- Labels: Bad Dreams; Empire
- Producers: The 87's; A. G. Cook; AJ Ruined My Record; Carl Falk; Jay Scalez; J. White Did It; Keanu Beats; Lil'A Beats; OG Parker; Pliznaya; Smash David; Young Forever Beats

Iggy Azalea chronology
Wicked Lips (2019)	The End of an Era (2021)

Alternate cover
- Deluxe edition cover

Singles from The End of an Era
- 1. "Sip It" Released: 2 April 2021; 2. "Brazil" Released: 2 April 2021; 3. "Iam the Stripclub" Released: 2 July 2021

The End of an Era is the third and final studio album by Australian rapper Iggy Azalea. It was released independently on 13 August 2021 through Azalea's label Bad Dreams Records and Empire Distribution, with the deluxe edition following on 17 September 2021. Taking inspiration from the end of her 20s for the title, Azalea stated that she wanted the album to be a "time capsule" of that decade of her life. The End of an Era includes guest appearances from Bia, Sophia Scott and Ellise on the standard edition, while Alice Chater and Tyga are featured on the deluxe edition. Production was handled by Azalea's frequent collaborator J. White Did It and several others. It was preceded by three singles: "Sip It", "Brazil" and "Iam the Stripclub".

The End of an Era received positive reviews from music critics. The album reached number nine on the Australian Hip Hop/R&B albums chart and number thirty six on the UK R&B Albums chart. It failed to replicate the success of her debut and sophomore album in any territory. To further promote the album, Azalea joined Pitbull as the opening act on his I Feel Good Tour.

== Background and release ==
In 2019, Azalea released her second studio album In My Defense and her fifth EP Wicked Lips. Following the release of the latter, she began working on further music with several producers, including J. White Did It with whom she had collaborated extensively on In My Defense and Wicked Lips. White described Azalea as "laser focused on getting the people something fresh, something new" and praised her work ethic. On 21 August 2020, she released a standalone single with Tinashe titled "Dance Like Nobody's Watching".

In March 2021, Azalea tweeted that the sound of her third studio album would mark a return to her mixtape roots. She revealed the cover art on 3 August 2021 on her Instagram. Two days later, she shared the track listing along with the pre-order of the album and promotional single "Sex on the Beach". On 17 September 2021, Azalea released the deluxe edition of The End of an Era, featuring three additional songs.

== Promotion ==
=== Singles ===
On 2 April 2021, Azalea released "Sip It", a collaboration with Tyga, as the official lead single from The End of an Era. It includes a B-side titled "Brazil". A music video was uploaded for "Sip It" on the same day, while "Brazil" received a remix featuring Brazilian drag queen and recording artist Gloria Groove on 20 April 2021 accompanied by a visualiser for the original version. "Sip It" peaked at 40 on the New Zealand Hot Singles chart. "Sip It" does not appear on the standard version of the album, but appears on the deluxe version. "Brazil" appears on both versions of the album.

On 2 July 2021, Azalea released the second single from The End of an Era, "Iam the Stripclub". Its music video, uploaded the same day, attracted controversy due to accusations of blackfishing; Azalea called the allegations "ridiculous and baseless".

On 5 August 2021, a week before the album, Azalea released "Sex on the Beach" featuring Sophia Scott as the promotional single from The End of an Era. Azalea said in an interview with Billboard that she decided to keep Scott, a relatively unknown artist, on the song, "I liked her voice and I wanted to stay true to the intent of the song. For me this album is more about a passion project than wanting it to be some gigantic commercial success."

=== Tour ===
To further promote the album, Azalea joined Pitbull as the opening act on his I Feel Good Tour. The tour covered 33 cities across the United States. It began on 20 August 2021 in Clarkston, Michigan and finished on 16 October 2021 in Rapid City, South Dakota.

== Artwork and title ==
The standard edition artwork for The End of an Era depicts Azalea lying on a wall covered in tiles. Behind her is a statue of three people holding a globe with the album title in neon capital letters, inspired by the film Scarface (1983). The deluxe edition artwork also features the statue, but shows Azalea lying in an inflatable chair in the middle of a pool. She is surrounded by drowning men and banknotes, a reference to the film The Great Gatsby (2013). Both artworks were photographed by Thom Kerr.

Azalea stated that the title The End of an Era refers to the end of her 20s and that she wanted the album to be a "time capsule" of that decade of her life. She also mentioned that she would take a hiatus from music for several years after the album's release to focus on other projects.

== Critical reception ==
Professional ratings
Review scores
Source	Rating
Tom Hull – on the Web	A−

Tom Hull responded positively to the album, particularly the production behind songs like "Emo Club Anthem" and "Good Times with Bad People": "I'm feeling kind of weird liking a song where the refrain is 'I love drugs,' or another explaining 'You need a good girl / I'm just a good time.' I suppose I could blame the beats." Happy Magazine also rated the album highly, with reviewer Matthew Leong saying, "The End of an Era is a club-ready farewell from one of hip hop's most intriguing and visually creative figures. The young rapper who fought tooth and nail to be heard, is leaving behind a musical legacy that demands you to get on your feet, take a shot and dance the night away." In another positive review, Cameron Sunkel of EDM calls tracks "STFU", "Iam the Stripclub", and "Emo Club Anthem" as standout album tracks saying of the latter: "The self-indulgent 'Emo Club Anthem' boasts a moody, detuned club synth that sounds like the cross between a future house and bass house producer's repertoire." Gloria called the album "this generation's Blackout".

== Track listing ==
The End of an Era – standard edition
No.	Title	Writer(s)	Producer(s)	Length
1.	"Sirens"	Amethyst Amelia Kelly	AJ Ruined My Record; Jay Scalez	2:55
2.	"Brazil"	Kelly; Bobby Sessions	AJ Ruined My Record; Jay Scalez	3:09
3.	"Pillow Fight"	Kelly; Session; Charlotte Emma Aitchison; Elizabeth Eden Harris; Alexander Guy Cook	A. G. Cook	2:47
4.	"Emo Club Anthem"	Kelly; Bobby Sessions	Jay Scalez	2:50
5.	"STFU"	Kelly; Bobby Sessions	AJ Ruined My Record	2:31
6.	"Iam the Stripclub"	Kelly; Anthony Jermaine White; Bobby Sessions	J. White Did It	2:48
7.	"Nights Like This"	Kelly	Carl Falk	2:33
8.	"Woke Up (Diamonds)"	Kelly; Tedra Wilson	AJ Ruined My Record; Jay Scalez	2:41
9.	"Is That Right" (featuring Bia)	Kelly; Bianca Miquela Landrau	Young Forever Beats; AJ Ruined My Record	2:50
10.	"XXXTRA"	Kelly	AJ Ruined My Record	3:03
11.	"Peach Body"	Kelly	Keanu Beats; Pliznaya; Lil'A Beats	3:08
12.	"Sex on the Beach" (featuring Sophia Scott)	Kelly; Sophia Scott; Bobby Sessions	Jay Scalez	3:01
13.	"Good Times with Bad People"	Kelly	OG Parker	2:25
14.	"Day 3 in Miami (End of an Era)" (featuring Ellise)	Kelly; Sophia Scott; Bobby Sessions	The 87's	2:46
Total length:				39:27

The End of an Era – deluxe edition
No.	Title	Writer(s)	Producer(s)	Length
15.	"N.Y.E." (featuring Alice Chater)	Kelly; Bobby Sessions; Kelsey Klingensmith; Shelton Scalez Jr.	AJ Ruined My Record; Jay Scalez	3:33
16.	"Sip It" (with Tyga)	Kelly; Micheal Nguyen-Stevenson; OG Parker	Smash David; OG Parker	3:15
17.	"Posh Spice"	Kelly	The 87's	2:29
Total length:				51:18

== Charts ==
Chart performance for The End of an Era
Chart (2021)	Peak position
Australian Hip Hop/R&B Albums (ARIA)	9
UK R&B Albums (Official Charts)	36

== Release history ==
Release history for End Of An Era
Region	Date	Format	Edition	Label	Ref.
Various	13 August 2021	Digital Download; Streaming; CD; LP	Standard	Bad Dreams	
Various	17 September 2021	Digital Download; Streaming; CD; LP	Deluxe	Bad Dreams	
