= Love Me Now? =

Studio album by Tory Lanez
- Released: October 26, 2018
- Recorded: 2018
- Studios: Umbrella House (Miami, FL); Camp David Studios (Miami, FL); Black Pyramid Studios (Los Angeles, CA); Street Exec Studios (Atlanta, GA); Loud House Studios (Atlanta, GA); Record Plant (Los Angeles, CA); Republic Studios (Los Angeles, CA); Tory's Apartment (Miami, FL); Kame House (Miami, FL); Hit Maka (Los Angeles, CA)
- Genres: Hip-hop; trap; R&B
- Length: 48:52
- Labels: Mad Love; Interscope
- Producers: CashMoneyAP; Cassius Jay; C-Sick; Dave Sava6e; Dez Wright; Foreign Teck; Hagler; Javar Rockamore; Jordan Lewis; NES; Nik Dean; Nils; OG Parker; OZ; PLVYHAUS; Smash David; The Loopholes; Uno; Vou

Tory Lanez chronology
Memories Don't Die (2018)	Love Me Now? (2018)	Chixtape 5 (2019)

Singles from Love Me Now?
- 1. "Talk to Me" Released: June 21, 2018; 2. "Keep in Touch" Released: August 16, 2018; 3. "Ferris Wheel" Released: January 15, 2019; 4. "Freaky" Released: March 15, 2019; 5. "Broke Leg" Released: May 31, 2019

Love Me Now? (stylized as LoVE me NOw) is the third studio album by Canadian singer and rapper Tory Lanez. It was released on October 26, 2018, through Mad Love Records and Interscope Records. This is the follow-up release to his second album Memories Don't Die which was released seven months prior. The production on the album was handled by multiple producers including Foreign Teck, OZ, Smash David, Cassius Jay, CashMoneyAP and NES among others. The album also features guest appearances by Chris Brown, 2 Chainz, Meek Mill, Rich the Kid, Lil Baby, A Boogie wit da Hoodie, Trippie Redd, Nav, Gunna and Bryson Tiller, among others.

Love Me Now? was supported by five singles: "Talk To Me", "Keep in Touch", "Ferris Wheel", "Freaky" and "Broke Leg". The album received generally mixed reviews from music critics and was a commercial success. The album debuted at number four on the US Billboard 200, earning 54,000 album-equivalent units in its first week.

== Background ==
Tory Lanez announced that he is working on two new albums, "Love Me Now" and "El Agua", set to be released on summer. He also announced on September 3 that XXXTentacion will be featured on his new album "Love Me Now". Lanez later unveiled on October 17, the release date of his new album, the cover album, the tracklist and featured artists, also revealing that XXXTentacion will not appear in the album. He also explained the reason why XXXTentacion does not appear in the album:

"When I tweeted it, I was very excited about the record, The record's a very dope record. But the clearance and the business side didn't let me clear it in time. Hopefully, we get to get it out soon so everybody can hear it. It just didn't make the deadline for Love Me Now?"

The album was released on October 26, 2018.

== Singles ==
Love Me Now? was supported by three singles. The first single, "Talk to Me" with Rich the Kid was released on June 21, 2018. Tory premiered the single on Zane Lowe's Beats 1 radio show to promote the "Love Me Now?" album. The music video was released on July 17, 2018. The single debuted at number 76 on the US Billboard Hot 100 chart on the week of November 10, 2018. The single eventually peaked at number 43 on the chart dated January 12, 2019. The second single, "Keep in Touch" featuring Bryson Tiller was released on August 17, 2018. The third single, "Ferris Wheel" featuring Trippie Redd was released on January 15, 2019. The music video was also released the same day. The single missed the Hot 100 but managed to peak at number five on the US Bubbling Under the Hot 100 chart.

=== Promotional singles ===
The first promotional single, "Numbers Out The Gym" was released on July 27, 2018. The music video was also released the same day. The second promotional single, "B.A.B.Y. featuring Moneybagg Yo was released on August 10, 2018. The music video was also released the same day. The third promotional single, "Kendall Jenner Music" later retitled as "KJM" was released on August 25, 2018. The music video was released online the following day. The fourth promotional single, "Drip Drip Drip" featuring Meek Mill was released on October 19, 2018. The single peaked at number six on the US Bubbling Under the Hot 100 chart. The song also peaked at number 56 on the Canadian Hot 100 and number 82 on the UK Singles Chart respectively. The final promotional single, "Miami" featuring Gunna was released October 24, 2018. The single peaked at number 14 on the US Bubbling Under the Hot 100 chart. The song also peaked at number 89 on the Canadian Hot 100.

== Critical reception ==
Professional ratings
Review scores
Source	Rating
Now	4/5 Ns
Pitchfork	5/10
XXL	L

Love Me Now? received mixed reviews from critics. In a review for Pitchfork, Alphonse Pierre wrote, "There isn't anything new LoVE me NOw will teach you about Tory Lanez. He still craves respect and wants to be recognized by his peers and fans alike as the hip-hop and R&B savant that he thinks he is."

At the Juno Awards of 2019, the album won the Juno Award for Rap Recording of the Year.

== Commercial performance ==
Love Me Now? debuted at number four on the US Billboard 200, earning 54,000 album-equivalent units (including 5,000 copies as pure album sales) in its first week. This became Tory Lanez's third US top-ten debut on the chart. The album also accumulated a total of 62.5 million on-demand audio streams from its songs that week. In its second week, the album dropped to number 17 on the chart, earning an additional 28,000 units.

== Track listing ==
Credits were adapted from iTunes and Tidal.

No.	Title	Writer(s)	Producer(s)	Length
1.	"Why Don't You Love Me?"	Daystar Peterson; Charles Dumazer	C-Sick	3:32
2.	"She Told Me"	Peterson; Alex Petit	CashMoneyAP	3:24
3.	"Duck My Ex" (featuring Chris Brown and 2 Chainz)	Peterson; Christopher Brown; Tauheed Epps; Samuel Jimenez	Smash David; Rekless^{[b]}	3:11
4.	"Drip Drip Drip" (featuring Meek Mill)	Peterson; Robert Williams; David Austin; Jimenez	Smash David; Dave Sava6e^{[b]}	3:50
5.	"Talk to Me" (with Rich the Kid)	Peterson; Dimitri Roger; Jimenez; Barrington Wright; Tavarez	Smash David; Rekless^{[b]}	3:04
6.	"Flexible" (featuring Chris Brown and Lil Baby)	Peterson; Brown; Dominique Jones; Jimenez; Joshua Parker; Terrence Williams	Smash David; OG Parker; Tee Romano^{[a]}	3:19
7.	"If It Ain't Right" (featuring A Boogie wit da Hoodie)	Peterson; Artist Dubose; Petit; Michael Hernandez; Dylan Cleary-Krell	CashMoneyAP; Foreign Teck; Dez Wright; Mira^{[b]}	2:41
8.	"Ferris Wheel" (featuring Trippie Redd)	Peterson; Michael White IV; Ozan Yildirim; Cleary-Krell	OZ; Dez Wright	2:32
9.	"Cut Me Off" (featuring Nav)	Peterson; Navraj Goraya; Amir Esmailian; Javar Rockamore; Robert Reese; Theodore Thomas; Thomas Walker	Javar Rockamore; The Loopholes	2:04
10.	"The Run Off"	Peterson; Jimenez; Austin	Smash David; Dave Sava6e^{[b]}	2:51
11.	"You Thought Wrong"	Peterson; Petit; Kevin Orellana	CashMoneyAP; Alexvnder Wolf	3:35
12.	"Miami" (featuring Gunna)	Peterson; Sergio Kitchens; Joshua Cross	Cassius Jay	4:04
13.	"Keep in Touch" (with Bryson Tiller)	Peterson; Bryson Tiller; Phillip Coleman, Jr.; Marvin Thomas; Jordan Lewis	NES; Hagler; Jordan Lewis	3:20
14.	"S.W.I.N.G" (featuring PnB Rock and Trey Songz)	Peterson; Rakim Allen; Tremaine Neverson; Petit; Hernandez; Cleary-Krell	CashMoneyAP; Foreign Teck; Dez Wright	4:39
15.	"KJM"	Peterson; Jimenez; Dante Pea; Wright	Smash David; PLVYHAUS^{[a]}	2:48
Total length:				48:52

Love Me Now? – Reloaded
No.	Title	Writer(s)	Producer(s)	Length
1.	"Broke Leg" (with Quavo and Tyga)	Peterson; Quavious Marshall; Michael Stevenson; Dwayne Carter, Jr.; Jonathan Smith; Todd Anthony Shaw; Terius Gray; Byron Thomas; Dejan Nikolic; Ugur Tik; Hernandez; Wright	Foreign Teck; Vou; Nik Dean; Uno	2:45
2.	"Freaky"	Peterson; Roger; Yildirim; Nils Noehden	OZ; Nils	2:53
Total length:				54:30

Notes

- ^{^[a]} signifies an additional producer
- ^{^[b]} signifies an uncredited co-producer
- "Why Don't You Love Me?" is stylized as "Why DON’T You LOVE me?"
- "She Told Me" is stylized as "SHE tOLd Me"
- "Duck My Ex" is stylized as "DucK my Ex"
- "Drip Drip Drip" is stylized as "DrIP DrIp Drip"
- "Talk to Me" is stylized as "TAlk tO Me"
- "Flexible" is stylized as "FlEXiBle"
- "If It Ain't Right" is stylized as "IF iT Ain’T rIGHt"
- "Ferris Wheel" is stylized as "FeRRis WhEEL"
- "Cut Me Off" is stylized as "CuT me oFF"
- "The Run Off" is stylized as "ThE RUn oFF"
- "You Thought Wrong" is stylized as "YoU ThouGHt WrONg"
- "Miami" is stylized as "MiAMi"
- "Keep in Touch" is stylized as "KeeP IN tOUcH"
- "S.W.I.N.G" is stylized as "S.w.I.n.G"
- "KJM" is stylized as "KJm" and is an abbreviation for "Kendall Jenner Music"
- "Broke Leg" contains uncredited vocals by O.T. Genasis
- "Freaky" contains uncredited vocals by Rich the Kid

Sample credits

- "Broke Leg" contains a sample from "Back That Azz Up", written by Terius Gray, Dwayne Carter, and Byron Thomas, as performed by Juvenile featuring Mannie Fresh and Lil Wayne.

== Personnel ==
Credits adapted from Tidal.

- Charles Dumazer – associated performer (track 1), programming (track 1)
- Johann Chavez – studio personnel (all tracks), mixer (all tracks), engineer (track 13)
- Play Picasso – studio personnel (1–4, 6–15), mixer (1–4, 6–15)
- Alex Petit – associated performer (track 2, 11), programming (track 2, 11)
- Samuel Jimenez – associated performer (tracks 3, 4, 15), programming (tracks 3, 4, 15)
- Finis "KY" White – studio personnel (track 3, 6), mixer (track 3, 6)
- MikFly – engineer (track 5), studio personnel (track 5)
- Daystar Peterson – engineer (track 5), studio personnel (track 5)
- Alex Petit – associated performer (track 6, 7, 14), programming (track 6, 7, 14)
- Michael Hernandez – associated performer (track 6, 7, 14), programming (track 6, 7, 14)
- Dylan Cleary-Krel – associated performer (track 6, 7, 14), programming (track 6, 7, 14)
- Oz – associated performer (track 8)
- Dez Wright – associated performer (track 8)
- Stonii Tha Melody God – associated performer (track 9), programming (track 9)
- Rockamore – associated performer (track 9), programming (track 9)
- Bobby Keyz – associated performer (track 9), programming (track 9)
- Kevin Orellana – associated performer (track 11), programming (track 11)
- Joshua Cross – associated performer (track 12), programming (track 12)
- Bryson Tiller – engineer (track 13), studio personnel (track 13)
- Chris Gehringer – mastering engineer (track 13), studio personnel (track 13)

== Charts ==
=== Weekly charts ===
Chart (2018)	Peak position
Australian Digital Albums (ARIA)	41
Belgian Albums (Ultratop Flanders)	68
Belgian Albums (Ultratop Wallonia)	142
Canadian Albums (Billboard)	4
Dutch Albums (Album Top 100)	21
French Download Albums (SNEP)	39
Irish Albums (IRMA)	60
New Zealand Albums (RMNZ)	37
Norwegian Albums (VG-lista)	26
Swiss Albums (Schweizer Hitparade)	90
UK Albums (Official Charts)	18
UK R&B Albums (Official Charts)	10
US Billboard 200	4
US Top R&B/Hip-Hop Albums (Billboard)	2

=== Year-end charts ===
Chart (2019)	Position
Canadian Albums (Billboard)	49
US Billboard 200	93
US Top R&B/Hip-Hop Albums (Billboard)	69

== Certifications ==
Region	Certification	Certified units/sales
United Kingdom (BPI)	Silver	60,000^{‡}
^{‡} Sales+streaming figures based on certification alone.
