= Smash David =

American record producer and songwriter

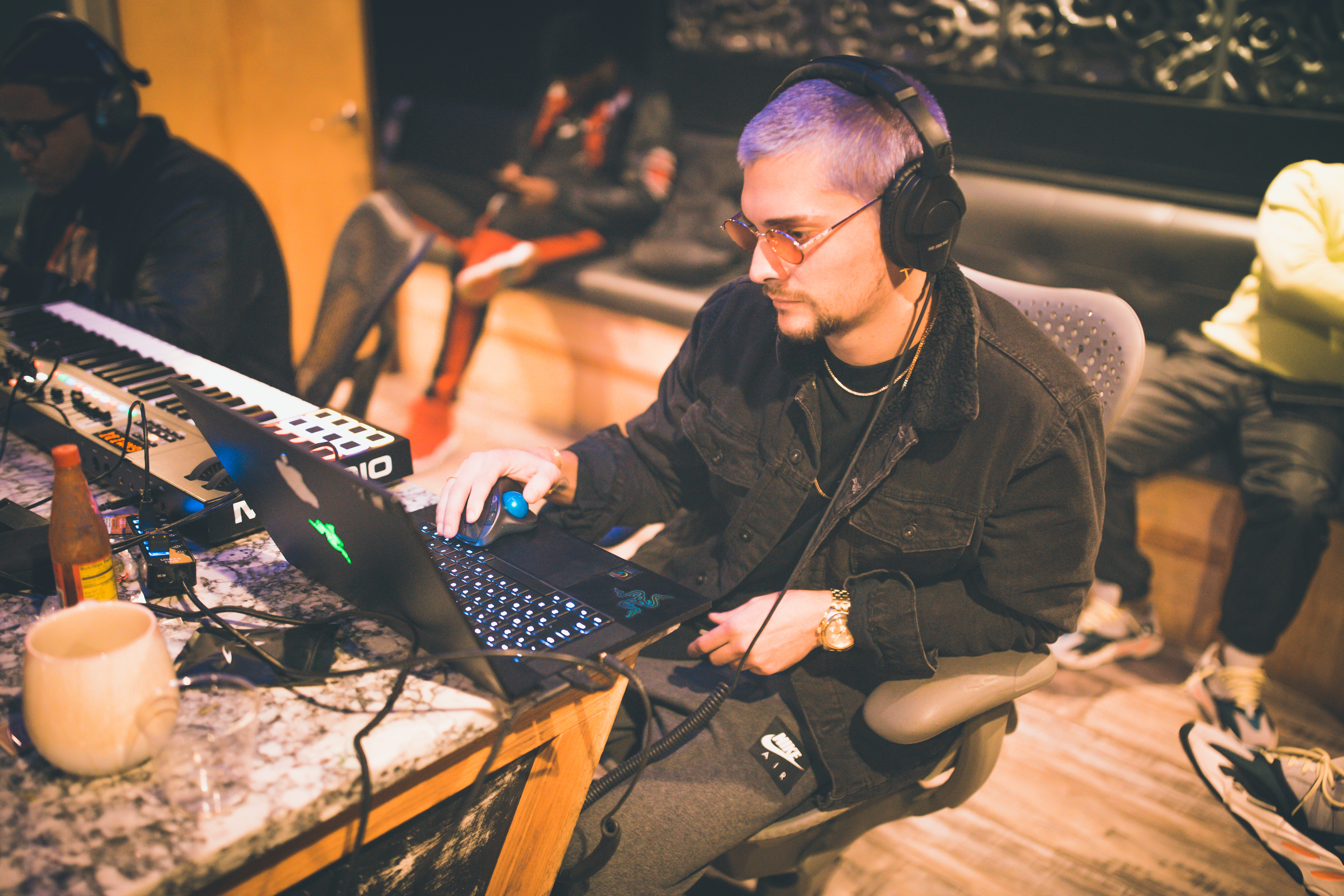

Background information
- Born: Samuel David Jimenez; Spain
- Origin: Miami, Florida, U.S.
- Genres: R&B; pop; hip-hop
- Occupations: Record producer; songwriter
- Years active: 2009–present
- Label: Future Music
- Publisher: Warner/Chappell
- Website: gotitonsmash.com

Samuel David Jimenez, professionally known as Smash David, is an American record producer and songwriter. He produced Big Sean's 2016 single "Bounce Back", as well as Chris Brown's 2017 single "Pills & Automobiles", both of which peaked within the top 50 of the Billboard Hot 100.

== Early life ==
Samuel David Jimenez is Spanish, raised in Miami, Florida.

== Career ==
Smash David has worked with the artist and producers Khalid, Omarion, Dej Loaf, Kehlani, Jeremiah, Lil Wayne, Jason Derulo, Hitmaka and Metro Boomin. On February 25, 2017, his production for Big Sean’s song Bounce Back peaked at number 6 on the Billboard Hot 100 and went quadruple platinum by the Recording Industry Association of America (RIAA). He also received a certified Gold plaque for producing and co-writing Chris Brown’s Pills & Automobiles featuring Yo Gotti, A Boogie wit da Hoodie, and Kodak Black and a 5× platinum plaque for Location by Khalid.

== Certifications and awards ==
"Pills and Automobiles" by Chris Brown ft A Boogie, Yo Gotti, Kodak Black - certified Platinum by RIAA on January 5, 2018

"Bounce Back" by Big Sean - certified 4× Platinum by RIAA on August 10, 2018

"Location" by Khalid - certified 5× Platinum by RIAA on August 14, 2018

"B.I.D" by Tory Lanez - certified Gold by RIAA on September 21, 2018

"1942" by G-Eazy ft Yo Gotti and YBN Nahmir - certified Platinum by RIAA on January 30, 2019

== Production credits ==
Year	Title	Artist	Album	Additional Producers
2015	"Dreams Are Real"	Tinashe	Amethyst	
2015	"Been On My Grind"	Dej Loaf	...And See That's the Thing	
2015	"Blow A Check"	Zoey Dollaz	Who Don't Like Dollaz	
2016	"Nasty" (featuring Jeremih and Spice)	Kid Ink	—N/a	
2016	"Naked"	Jason Derulo	—N/a	
2016	"4th Quarter"	Ace Hood	—N/a	
2016	"1st Round Draft Pick"	Ace Hood	—N/a	
2016	"Act"	Juicy J	—N/a	
2016	"Don't Take It Personal"	Lyrica Anderson	—N/a	
2016	"Match That"	Chinx	—N/a	
2016	"Bounce Back"	Big Sean	I Decided	
2016	Yea I Do	Chinx	Legends Never Die	
2016	No Trust	Kevin Gates	—N/a	
2016	Cost (featuring Kap G)	Sage The Gemini	—N/a	CuBeatz
2017	"Set It Off x Better"	Tory Lanez	—N/a	
2017	"Distance"	Omarion	—N/a	
2017	"Location"	Khalid	American Teen	Syksense Tunji Ige Taz Taylor
2017	"Get Mine" (featuring Young Thug)	Bryson Tiller	—N/a	
2017	"I'm a Fan" (featuring Jeremih)	Pia Mia	—N/a	
2017	"Cost" (featuring Kap G)	Sage the Gemini	Morse Code	
2017	"No Ice"	Cousin Stizz	—N/a	
2017	"Pills & Automobiles"	Chris Brown	Heartbreak on a Full Moon	OG Parker
2017	"Hola" (featuring Maluma)	Flo Rida	—N/a	Space Primates
2017	"Leaning" (featuring Tory Lanez)	PartyNextDoor	—N/a	
2017	"Confide" (featuring Juicy J)	PnB Rock	—N/a	
2017	"Flight"	Omarion	CP4	
2017	"Been Around"	Omarion	CP4	
2017	"Im a Fan" (featuring Jeremih)	Pia Mia	—N/a	
2017	"Location" (Remix) (featuring Kehlani & Lil Wayne)	Khalid	American Teen	Syksense Tunji Ige
2018	"Leaning (Remix)"	Bryson Tiller	—N/a	Nick Fouryn
2018	"1942" (featuring Yo Gotti and YBN Nahmir)	G-Eazy	Uncle Drew (Soundtrack)	Hitmaka Skip On Da Beat
2018	"Bipolar" (featuring Quavo)	Gucci Mane	Evil Genius	OG Parker Deko
2018	"Confide"	PnB Rock	Catch These Vibes	Wallis Lane
2018	"Mo Paper" (featuring YG)	Rich The Kid	—N/a	
2018	"Like I Used To"	Tinashe	—N/a	Hitmaka
2018	"Throw A Fit"	Tinashe	—N/a	Hitmaka
2018	"B.I.D."	Tory Lanez	Memories Don't Die	OG Parker
2018	"Connection" (featuring Fabolous, Davo and Paloma Ford)	Tory Lanez	Memories Don't Die	Nick Foryn
2018	"KJM"	Tory Lanez	Love Me Now?	PLVYHAUS
2018	"The Run Off"	Tory Lanez	Love Me Now?	Dave Sava6e
2018	"Duck My Ex" (featuring Chris Brown and 2 Chainz)	Tory Lanez	Love Me Now?	Rekless
2018	"Flexible" (featuring Chris Brown and Lil Baby)	Tory Lanez	Love Me Now?	OG Parker Tee Romano
2018	"Talk To Me (Remix)" (featuring Rich The Kid and Lil Wayne)	Tory Lanez	Love Me Now?	
2018	"Drip Drip Drip" (featuring Meek Mill)	Tory Lanez	Love Me Now?	Dave Sava6e
2018	Leaning (featuring PARTYNEXTDOOR)	Tory Lanez	—N/a	
2018	"Baby" (featuring DJ E Feezy)	Tory Lanez	—N/a	
2018	"Set It Off x Better"	Tory Lanez	The New Toronto 2	
2018	"Clout" (featuring 21 Savage)	Ty Dolla Sign	Beach House 3	Hitmaka
2018	"Simple" (featuring Yo Gotti)	Ty Dolla Sign	Beach House 3	Hitmaka Cu Beatz
2018	"Holding On" (featuring 24Hrs)	Tyga	Kyoto	Hitmaka Nick Fouryn
2018	"25 Lighters"	Wifisfuneral	Ethernet	
2018	"Knots" (featuring Jay Critch)	Wifisfuneral	Ethernet	
2018	"OMG" (featuring Wiz Khalifa)	Iggy Azalea	Survive The Summer	Weaver
2018	"Smash!" (featuring PnB Rock)	XXXtentacion	?	Rekless
2019	"Chi Chi" (featuring Chris Brown)	Trey Songz	Anticipation 4	Cu Beatz
2019	"Big Bag" (featuring Stini)	Iggy Azalea	In My Defense	J. White Did It
2019	"Natural Disaster / Aura"	Chris Brown	Indigo	OG Parker Romano Don City Sound Z
2019	"Side Nigga"	Chris Brown	Indigo	Wallis Lane
2019	"Dear God"	Chris Brown	Indigo	
2019	"Play Catch Up"	Chris Brown	Indigo	
2019	"Link Up"	Tinashe	Songs for You	Hitmaka
2020	"Complicated"	KSI	Dissimulation	S-X, Menace
2020	"My Window" (featuring Lil Wayne)	YoungBoy Never Broke Again	Top	Tenroc
2020	"Friends Become Strangers"	Tory Lanez	Daystar	Wallis Lane, Arcade City Beats, TenRoc
2021	"Ticket"	Duki	Desde el Fin del Mundo	Yesan, Asan
2021	"Sip It"	Iggy Azalea, Tyga	The End of an Era	OG Parker
2021	"Yonaguni"	Bad Bunny		Byrd, FinesseGTB, Tainy
2023	"Tinnitus"	Tomorrow X Together	The Name Chapter: TEMPTATION	Dystinkt Beats
2023	"Monaco"	Bad Bunny	Nadie sabe lo que va a pasar mañana	Mag, La Paciencia, Edsclusive, Argel
2023	"Fina" (featuring Young Miko)	Bad Bunny	Nadie sabe lo que va a pasar mañana	Mag, La Paciencia, Foreign Teck, Nico Baran, DJ Joe, Patron, Argel
2023	"Teléfono Nuevo" (featuring Luar la L)	Bad Bunny	Nadie sabe lo que va a pasar mañana	Mag, La Paciencia, Argel
2023	"Mercedes Carota" (featuring YOVNGCHIMI)	Bad Bunny	Nadie sabe lo que va a pasar mañana	Tainy, Mag, Byrd
2023	"Los Pits"	Bad Bunny	Nadie sabe lo que va a pasar mañana	Mag, La Paciencia, Foreign Teck, Sean Turk, Only Hope
2023	"Perro Negro" (featuring Feid)	Bad Bunny	Nadie sabe lo que va a pasar mañana	Mag, La Paciencia, Argel, Digital Jet, Jon Mili, Frankie
2026	"Qeubec"	Drake	HABIBTI (FOMO)	BEAM, FASHXN, b4u, Sean Turk & Mike Wavvs
