= Switch (Iggy Azalea song) =

Single by Iggy Azalea featuring Anitta
- Released: 19 May 2017
- Recorded: August 2016–February 2017
- Genre: Pop-rap
- Length: 3:09
- Label: Def Jam
- Songwriters: Amethyst Kelly; Anton Hård af Segerstad; Georgia Ku; Maurice Simmonds; Kyle Owens; Akil King; Christopher Martin
- Producers: The Family; Eric Weaver

Iggy Azalea singles chronology
"Mo Bounce" (2017)	"Switch" (2017)	"Savior" (2018)

Anitta singles chronology
"Você Partiu Meu Coração" (2017)	"Switch" (2017)	"Paradinha" (2017)

"Switch" is a song recorded by Australian rapper Iggy Azalea featuring Brazilian singer Anitta. It was released on 19 May 2017, by Def Jam. "Switch" was written by Azalea with Anton Hård af Segerstad, Akil King, Christopher Martin, Georgia Ku, Kyle Owens and Maurice "Verse" Simmonds. It was produced by The Family and Eric Weaver. "Switch" is a pop song with a tropical vibe and Latin flavor. Switch is certified platinum in Brazil.

== Background and release ==
Azalea's sophomore studio album was originally entitled Digital Distortion and set to be released in 2016, with its lead-single "Team", being released in March 2016. However, the album was postponed several times in 2016, with Azalea initially addressing the delay due to her stint as a judge on the eighth season of The X Factor Australia, and later adding that she also delayed the album to include a collaboration with Russian-German DJ Zedd. Eventually, the album was postponed to 2017, since Azalea claimed she experienced both personal and creative changes.

In March 2017, she released a second single titled "Mo Bounce". Quickly afterwards, Azalea teased a snippet of a song in an Instagram video with the caption: "IGGY X ANITTA" in early April, indicating that she was collaborating with Brazilian recording artist Anitta. Later in the same month, they were seen together in the studio to finish the track. Eventually, Azalea revealed that the track was called "Switch" by posting its cover art on 2 May 2017. In the cover art, she is "staring into the camera while wearing a one-piece maroon bathing suit," as described by Billboard's Gil Kaufman. It was released digitally on 19 May 2017 by Def Jam Recordings, and was sent to both contemporary hit radio and rhythmic contemporary radio on 23 May 2017.

== Recording ==
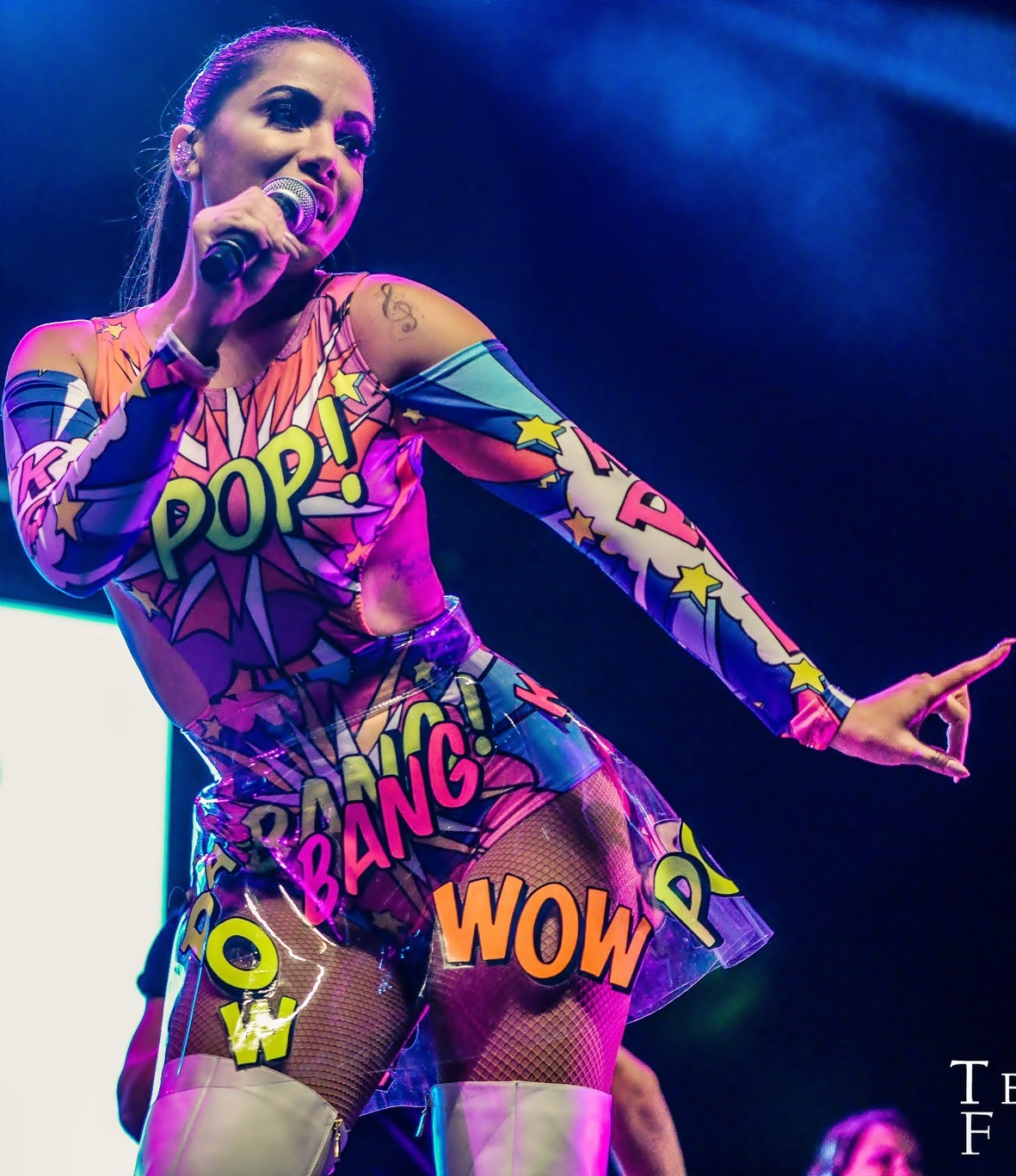
Brazilian singer Anitta is featured in the song.

"Switch" was recorded by Azalea in August 2016. However, she needed a female singer to sing its chorus and spent months trying to find a fitting voice, claiming she wanted to think outside the box. In a radio interview with Zach Sang, Azalea discussed the track, adding: "I couldn’t think of who should sing on this song with me because I just really wanted to bring another female energy. I didn’t really have any female collaborations yet on my album and I think people really enjoy me collaborating with other women and I wanted to make sure that I still did that." She continued talking, saying that a friend of hers suggested Anitta to sing the chorus. While watching Anitta videos on YouTube, she was impressed by her stage presence and dancing skills in music videos as "Show das Poderosas" and "Bang", and commented: "[...] I hit her up and asked if she would be interested in doing the song and it just kind of worked out perfectly." Anitta's part on the track was only recorded in February 2017, where Azalea helped her with the song's cadence and spelling of some words. In another interview, she described Anitta as a "very unapologetic and strong but super feminine. We clicked straight away."

== Composition and lyrics ==
"Switch" was written by Azalea, Anton Hård af Segerstad, Akil King, Christopher Martin, Georgia Ku, Kyle Owens and Maurice "Verse" Simmonds. It was produced by The Family and Eric Weaver. "Switch" is a pop song, having a "tropical vibe and Latin flavor" as described by Azalea herself. Its instrumentation consists in bass, plucky strings, bongos, and hand claps. As claimed by Azalea, "I wanted to make a song that could be fun to dance to, but the lyrics when you really listen to them are very powerful." Lyrically, the song talks about "looking good and being fierce" and was also described by Azalea as about "a woman being in control of what I want to do and when I want to go and when I want to stop." Lindsey India of XLL added that its lyrics find Azalea "boosting her confidence no matter what the haters might have to say." During the chorus, the sexual lyrics "likens her moves to a traffic light that shifts from red to yellow to green," as they sing: "Red light, yellow light, green light, Switch!/This is about the time you recognize I’m that bitch." In its bridge, as noted by Entertainment Weekly's Joey Nolfi, "Azalea seemingly references her separation from former fiancé Nick Young, rapping, 'He don’t love you, that ring ain’t big enough.'" She also raps about "boasting about going topless, along with having a top-tier booty that 'deserves an applause.'"

== Critical reception ==
Joey Nolfi of Entertainment Weekly agreed, classifying it as "a summer-ready club banger" with an "easily danceable chorus." Lindsey India of XXL wrote that the song "could easily become a pop party anthem this summer," while Melody Chiu of People named it "powerful". Joshua Espinoza of Complex opined that the song "uses the same formula as Iggy’s breakout song 'Fancy,' noting that it has "infectious beat," a "catchy hook" and "cocky lyrics."

== Music video ==
A few days after the song's release, an unfinished version of its music video was leaked. After this, Azalea stated that an official version of the music video would not be released. In the music video, Azalea and her team of dancers remake an empty pool and use it as their matching red, yellow and green backdrop. Anitta also makes an appearance, pretending to watch ice sculptures of alligators before lounging in a pool with Azalea. The pair later wear matching cheetah print outfits while surrounded by the large cats.

== Track listing ==
- Digital download (Explicit version)
1. "Switch" (featuring Anitta) – 3:09
- Digital download (Remixes EP)
1. "Switch" (featuring Anitta) (Loud Luxury Remix) – 3:20
2. "Switch" (featuring Anitta) (Aazar Remix) – 3:15
3. "Switch" (featuring Anitta) (Feenixpawl Remix) – 4:10
4. "Switch" (featuring Anitta) (Vertue Remix) – 3:34
5. "Switch" (featuring Anitta) (Tom Swoon Remix) – 3:42

== Charts ==
=== Weekly charts ===
Weekly chart performance for "Switch"
Chart (2017)	Peak position
Australia (ARIA)	180
Belgium (Ultratip Bubbling Under Wallonia)	13
Belgium Urban (Ultratop Flanders)	17
Canada CHR/Top 40 (Billboard)	39
Portugal (AFP)	70

=== Year-end charts ===
2017 year-end chart performance for "Switch"
Chart (2017)	Position
Brazil Streaming (Pro-Música Brasil)	173

== Certifications ==
Region	Certification	Certified units/sales
Brazil (Pro-Música Brasil)	Platinum	60,000^{‡}
^{‡} Sales+streaming figures based on certification alone.

== Release history ==
Release dates for "Switch"
Country	Date	Format	Label	Ref
Various	19 May 2017	Digital download	Def Jam Recordings	
United States	23 May 2017	Contemporary hit radio	Def Jam Recordings	
United States	23 May 2017	Rhythmic contemporary	Def Jam Recordings	
Various	28 July 2017	Digital download; streaming; Remixes	Def Jam Recordings	
