= Kream (song) =

2018 single by Iggy Azalea featuring Tyga

Single by Iggy Azalea featuring Tyga

from the EP Survive the Summer
- Released: 6 July 2018
- Genre: Hip hop
- Length: 2:46
- Label: Island
- Songwriters: Amethyst Kelly; Ronald Spence Jr.; Michael Stevenson; Nima Jahanbin; Paimon Jahanbin; Isaac Hayes; David Porter; Russell Jones; Gary Grice; Clifford Smith; Robert Diggs; Dennis Coles; Jason Hunter; Corey Woods; Lamont Hawkins
- Producers: Ronny J; GT; Wallis Lane

Iggy Azalea singles chronology
"Savior" (2018)	"Kream" (2018)	"Sally Walker" (2019)

Tyga singles chronology
"Taste" (2018)	"Kream" (2018)	"Swish" (2018)

Music video
- "Kream" on YouTube

"Kream" is a song by Australian rapper Iggy Azalea featuring American rapper Tyga, from Azalea's fourth extended play Survive the Summer. The song was released on 6 July 2018 by Island Records as the lead single from the EP. "Kream" was written by Azalea, Tyga, and Ronny J, and produced by Ronny J, GT, and Wallis Lane. The song passed 100 million streams on Spotify in February 2020, becoming Azalea's most recent song to do so since 2014's "No Mediocre" with T.I.

== Background and release ==
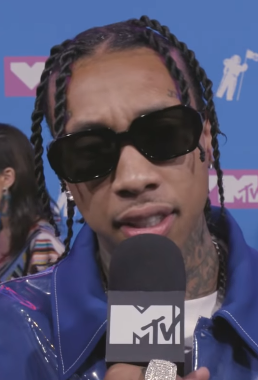
American rapper Tyga is featured on the song.

In early July 2018, Azalea tweeted "Since I cant seem to speak about anything without being asked - when is the EP dropping" and "S.T.S is dropping 6 July. #TheMoreYouKnow". "Kream" was originally meant to appear on Azalea's second studio album titled Digital Distortion; the album was eventually scrapped. The song was further delayed after Island Records appointed Darcus Beese as president of the label in May 2018. Teasers of the music video featured Iggy Azalea and Tyga during the filming process before release.

The song was released alongside a promotional single titled "Tokyo Snow Trip" on 6 July. On 12 July 2018, Azalea announced via Twitter that "Kream" would be sent to impact radio as a result of its success.

Almost exactly a year later, the song saw a mild resurgence as a snippet of the song became part of an internet challenge called Open Up The Safe Challenge (a play on the opening lyrics of the song).

In July 2019, a TikTok user, Johnny McKay, had uploaded a clip where the song was accidentally played instead of the US national anthem at a baseball game. The video quickly became an internet meme and subsequently went viral, causing the song to regain popularity. Later that month, the TikTok user claimed that the incident was all just fake.

== Composition ==
"Kream" is a spare, slow-bounce track with mentions of Sex Pistols band member Sid Vicious, Ice Cube and model Bella Hadid, referencing her viral "homeboy" interview, with "Keep that energy, gon' up that Hennessy (ass)/I need my bag quickly/Separate six-degrees, bitches said they know me/ Sex pistols, Sid Vicious, wet you when it's horny/Hit me on my Cash App, check it in the morning" [..] "And it's perfect timing, dream with the tanny/ Bella Hadid, homie could get it".

Kream contains an interpolation from the Wu Tang Clan's "C.R.E.A.M.", written by GZA, Ghostface Killah, U God, Ol' Dirty Bastard, RZA, Inspectah Deck, Method Man and Raekwon and also from Raw Beat Mafia's "Dead End", written by Nima Jahanbin, Paimon Jahanbin, Isaac Hayes and David Porter. The song's title is an acronym that comes from the line "cash rules everything around me".

== Music video ==
The music video was directed by Colin Tilley and filmed in Los Angeles, California. It is stripper-themed and features many women, including Azalea, twerking in a dark house with neon lighting. In another scene, Azalea is seen writhing in bed with Tyga. After a potential legal issue regarding the music video, which Azalea dubbed "Ovengate" on Twitter, the music video was released at 7pm EST on 6 July 2018. As of October 2024, the music video for "Kream" had surpassed 353 million views making it Azalea's seventh video to achieve this milestone.

== Chart performance ==
"Kream" debuted at number 96 on the Billboard Hot 100 and number 41 on the Billboard Digital Song Sales charts each dated 21 July 2018, respectively. It became Azalea's first entry on the Hot 100 since her 2016 song "Team". It was certified Platinum by the Recording Industry Association of America (RIAA) in February 2019. Outside the US the song peaked at number 26 in Hungary, number 54 in Canada and number 96 in Ireland.

== Credits and personnel ==
Credits adapted from Tidal.

- Iggy Azalea – vocals
- Tyga – vocals
- Ronny J – production
- GT – co-production
- Wallis Lane – production
- Christian "CQ" Quinonez – engineering
- Mike Seaberg – mixing assistance
- Rashawn Mclean – mixing assistance
- Jacob Richards – mixing assistance
- Jaycen Joshua – mixing

== Charts ==
Chart (2018)	Peak position
Australia Digital Tracks (ARIA)	27
Australian Artist Singles (ARIA)	14
Canada Hot 100 (Billboard)	54
France Downloads (SNEP)	148
Hungary (Single Top 40)	26
Ireland (IRMA)	96
Japan Hot Overseas (Billboard)	34
New Zealand Hot Singles (RMNZ)	11
US Billboard Hot 100	96
US Bubbling Under R&B/Hip-Hop Singles (Billboard)	1
US Rhythmic Airplay (Billboard)	27

== Certifications ==
Region	Certification	Certified units/sales
Brazil (Pro-Música Brasil)	2× Platinum	80,000^{‡}
New Zealand (RMNZ)	Gold	15,000^{‡}
Poland (ZPAV)	Platinum	20,000^{‡}
United States (RIAA)	Platinum	1,000,000^{‡}
^{‡} Sales+streaming figures based on certification alone.

== Release history ==
Region	Date	Format	Label	Ref.
Various	6 July 2018	Digital download	Island	
United States	7 August 2018	Rhythmic contemporary radio	Island; Republic	
