= Dance Like Nobody's Watching (song) =

2020 single by Iggy Azalea and Tinashe

Single by Iggy Azalea and Tinashe
- Released: 21 August 2020
- Genre: Pop
- Length: 3:02
- Label: Bad Dreams; Empire
- Songwriters: Amethyst Kelly; Tinashe Kachingwe; Haven; Bobby Sessions; Mikemac; Jordan Baum
- Producer: The 87's

Iggy Azalea singles chronology
| "Lola" (2019) | "Dance Like Nobody's Watching" (2020) | "Sip It" (2021) |

Tinashe singles chronology
| "Rascal (Superstar)" (2020) | "Dance Like Nobody's Watching" (2020) | "Love Line" (2021) |

"Dance Like Nobody's Watching" is a song by Australian rapper Iggy Azalea and American singer Tinashe. It was released on 21 August 2020, intended as the lead single from Azalea's third studio album The End of an Era (2021). It was later revealed that it would no longer serve as a lead single and would be a standalone single.

== Background and release ==
After teasing a new song under the title "DLNW", Azalea later revealed the title to be "Dance Like Nobody's Watching", a collaboration with American singer, songwriter Tinashe. The duo had previously collaborated on the remix of "All Hands on Deck" from Tinashe's debut album, Aquarius (2014). Following this, Tinashe was supposed to be the opening act for Azalea's The Great Escape Tour (2015), though it was ultimately cancelled. The song was originally released as the first single for Azalea's then-upcoming album, The End of an Era (2021), but was later scrapped and issued as a stand-alone single.

A lyric video was released on August 21, 2020, at midnight EST, upon song release. The video features behind-the-scenes photos and videos from the cover art shoot. The song was released on digital outlets on August 21.

== Critical reception ==
The track received mixed to positive reviews from critics, with some describing it as a "Summer Anthem" and a very strong track, while others deeming it to be "Average." In a positive review, Thomas Bleach described the track as "a lot of fun. It's the right amount of sassy and empowering along with playful elements that give you classic Iggy vibes."

== Track listing ==
CD single

1. Dance Like Nobody's Watching (Explicit)
2. Dance Like Nobody's Watching (Clean)
3. Dance Like Nobody's Watching (Club remix)

Digital download

1. Dance Like Nobody's Watching

== Charts ==
Chart performance
| Chart (2020) | Peak position |
|---|---|
| Scottish Singles Sales (Official Charts) | 77 |
| US Digital Song Sales (Billboard) | 33 |
| US Rap Digital Songs (Billboard) | 9 |

== Release history ==
Release history
| Region | Date | Format | Label | Ref. |
|---|---|---|---|---|
| Worldwide | 21 August 2020 | Digital download; streaming | Bad Dreams; Empire | |
| Worldwide | 2 October 2020 | CD | Bad Dreams; Empire | |
