= Savior (Iggy Azalea song) =

Single by Iggy Azalea featuring Quavo
- Released: 2 February 2018
- Genre: Downtempo; house; pop; tropical house
- Length: 3:31
- Label: Island
- Songwriters: Amethyst Kelly; Quavious Marshall; Akil King; Myjah Veira; Kyle Owens; Maurice Simmonds; Ian Devaney; Lisa Stansfield; Andy Morris; Henry Walter
- Producers: Cirkut; Manhun Glow

Iggy Azalea singles chronology
"Switch" (2017)	"Savior" (2018)	"Kream" (2018)

Quavo singles chronology
"Cupido" (2018)	"Savior" (2018)	"Bigger Than You" (2018)

Music video
- "Savior" on YouTube

"Savior" is a song recorded by Australian rapper Iggy Azalea featuring American rapper Quavo. It was written by Azalea, Quavo, Verse Simmonds, Akil King, Myjah Veira, Kyle Owens, Ian Devaney, Lisa Stansfield, Andy Morris and Cirkut, with production handled by Cirkut and Manhun Glow. The song was released via Island Records on 2 February 2018. It features an interpolation of co-writer Lisa Stansfield's 1989 single "All Around the World" and background vocals from artist Kat Meoz.

== Background and release ==
The song was first teased on 5 December 2016, with a brief snippet of the song playing on a private jet. That same day, a demo version was leaked featuring a guest appearance from Verse Simmonds instead of Quavo. On 9 January 2018, Azalea announced she would debut the single in a Super Bowl commercial for Monster Cable. She said in a Monster press conference at CES 2018 that the song would be officially released "around February 1st". She revealed the song's artwork through social media on 25 January, followed by short clips and behind the scene shots from the song's lyric video. A snippet was posted a day prior to its release, displaying its "island-themed instrumental".

She explained the meaning and purpose behind the song in a preview video, saying: "It is not a record about you needing a man or a woman to come and save you in a relationship, it's about you being your own savior and finding your own strength within yourself to figure it the fuck out. It's a really hard record for me to have written and I think it's going to be one I really struggle to perform, too, just 'cause I'll probably wanna cry every single time." "[The song] was created at a time when I felt so stagnant & alone, but I just couldn't pick up the phone and admit to even my closest friends how hopeless I felt," she wrote in a tweet. "So I hope I can connect with anyone else that's been/going thru it via this song."

Dr. Luke was originally listed as a co-writer and co-producer of the song. Azalea quickly declared via Twitter after causing public backlash, saying that the two producers of the song "have production agreements with Luke", and that she is not affiliated with Luke nor working with him. Luke was subsequently removed from the credits. It was then speculated Luke was being credited under a pseudonym.

Azalea stated she written the song because "[she'd] had a big breakup, and [her] career wasn't going well," referencing to her breakup with American basketball player Nick Young.

== Critical reception ==
Nick Mojica of XXL wrote that the song was "made for dance floors with its tropical-inspired house beat". Rob Arcand of Spin felt that it features "a low, down-tempo house beat with Quavo at his most melodic, Auto-Tuned self as Iggy aims more for songwriting craftsmanship than rapping acumen this go round".

== Live performances ==
On 16 March 2018, Azalea joined Demi Lovato on stage to perform "Savior", with Lovato singing the hook, during the latter's sold out headlining show at the Barclays Center in Brooklyn as a part of the Tell Me You Love Me World Tour. On 20 March 2018, Azalea performed "Savior" on The Late Late Show with James Corden alongside a choir-esque group of backup singers for the chorus. As Quavo did not perform the song with her, Azalea performed his parts of the song alongside her backup singers. Azalea performed the song with "newly pink" hair, as quoted by Billboard and an "all-black getup".

== Music video ==
The music video for "Savior" was directed by Colin Tilley and was released on March 1, 2018. It takes place inside a "neon church" and features a plethora of religious imagery and symbolism such as neon halos and crosses, burning roses, and a scene of Azalea being baptized.

== Credits and personnel ==
Credits adapted from Tidal.

- Iggy Azalea – songwriting
- Quavo – songwriting
- Akil King – songwriting
- Myjah Veira – songwriting
- Kyle Owens – songwriting
- Verse Simmonds – songwriting
- Ian Devaney – songwriting
- Lisa Stansfield – songwriting
- Andy Morris – songwriting
- Henry Walter – songwriting, production
- Manhun Glow – production
- John Hanes – engineering
- Tyler Sheppard – recording engineering assistantance
- Kalani Thompson – recording engineering assistantance
- Serban Ghenea – mixing
- Clint Gibbs – recording engineering
- Eric Weaver – recording engineering

== Charts ==
Chart (2018)	Peak position
Australia Urban (ARIA)	29
Australian Artist Singles (ARIA)	17
Belgium (Ultratip Bubbling Under Wallonia)	9
Belgium Urban (Ultratop Wallonia)	26
Canadian Hot Digital Songs (Billboard)	32
Czech Republic Airplay (ČNS IFPI)	79
France Downloads (SNEP)	159
New Zealand Heatseekers (RMNZ)	8
Scottish Singles Sales (Official Charts)	91
US Bubbling Under Hot 100 (Billboard)	7
US Digital Songs (Billboard)	20

== Certifications ==
Region	Certification	Certified units/sales
Brazil (Pro-Música Brasil)	Gold	20,000^{‡}
^{‡} Sales+streaming figures based on certification alone.

== Release history ==
Region	Date	Format	Label	Ref.
Various	2 February 2018	Digital download	Island	
United States	6 February 2018	Rhythmic contemporary radio	Island; Republic	
