= Mo Bounce =

Single by Iggy Azalea
- Released: 23 March 2017
- Recorded: 2016
- Genre: Electro hop; EDM; hip hop; pop
- Length: 3:42
- Label: Def Jam
- Songwriters: Amethyst Kelly; Jonathan Yip; Jeremy Reeves; Ray Romulus; Ray McCullough; Maurice Simmonds; Kevin Nishimura; James Roh; Virman Coquia
- Producers: The Stereotypes; Far East Movement

Iggy Azalea singles chronology
"Team" (2016)	"Mo Bounce" (2017)	"Switch" (2017)

Music video
- "Mo Bounce" on YouTube

"Mo Bounce" is a song recorded by Australian rapper Iggy Azalea. It was released on 23 March 2017 and it debuted on Zane Lowe's Beats 1 radio show. It was produced by The Stereotypes and Far East Movement.

The song was teased from the beginning of March with various pictures posted on her social networks, some of them being GIFs. The song was originally released as a second single from her then-forthcoming second studio album, then titled Digital Distortion, before being shelved and the album scrapped.

== Critical reception ==
Billboard commented that "the upbeat tempo and the fun and loud lyrics mirror the happier-sounding track and perhaps her [Iggy's] life right now." Claire Lobenfeld from Fact gave a negative review, calling the song "a blog house revival nightmare." According to Hardeep Phull from New York Post, the song is "the best thing the 26-year-old has released since her glory days of 2014" and "ultra-catchy", also pointing out "it's the strong comeback she desperately needs." "Mo Bounce" was among the Stereotype's recognized body of work that secured their Producer of the Year, Non-Classical nomination at the 60th Annual Grammy Awards. Time magazine ranked it as the fifth worst song of 2017, saying "the repetitive 'bounce, bounce, bounce' chorus was a respite" from Azalea's lyrics.

== Music video ==
The music video was shot in Hong Kong by director Lil Internet in late February. On 20 March 2017, Vevo announced the video would also be premiering on 24 March. On March 21, Iggy Azalea posted a series of GIFs on her Twitter profile from the music video as she partnered with Giphy to release a promotional set. There are multiple instances where young women are twerking, as well as Iggy doing so. On March 22, Vevo released a 20-second video promoting Iggy Azalea's single.

The official music video was released on 24 March 2017 on Vevo.

The music video was immediately broadcast after 10.30 p.m in France following sexual content, erotic images and raunchy scenes, with a warning Not advised to kids under 12 years old or ...16 years old (in French : déconseillé aux moins de 12 ans ou moins de 16 ans) on most of music channels.

In June 2018, the music video received 60 million views on YouTube.

== Track listing ==
- Digital download (Explicit version)
1. "Mo Bounce" – 3.42
- Digital download (Clean version)
1. "Mo Bounce" – 3:42
- Digital download (Remixes EP)
1. "Mo Bounce" (Deadly Zoo Remix) – 3:20
2. "Mo Bounce" (Eden Prince Remix) – 3:02
3. "Mo Bounce" (Dirtcaps Remix) – 3:38

== Charts ==
Chart (2017)	Peak position
Australia (ARIA)	63
Australia Urban (ARIA)	8
Canada Hot 100 (Billboard)	87
France Downloads (SNEP)	136
Germany (Deutsche Black Charts)	13
New Zealand Heatseekers (RMNZ)	10
Scotland Singles (Official Charts)	47
UK Singles Downloads (Official Charts)	53
US Bubbling Under Hot 100 (Billboard)	17
US Bubbling Under R&B/Hip-Hop Singles (Billboard)	2
US Dance Club Songs (Billboard)	21

== Certifications ==
Region	Certification	Certified units/sales
Brazil (Pro-Música Brasil)	Gold	30,000^{‡}
^{‡} Sales+streaming figures based on certification alone.

== Release history ==
Country	Date	Format	Label	Ref.
Worldwide	23 March 2017	Digital download	Def Jam	
United States	4 April 2017	Rhythmic contemporary	Def Jam	
United States	11 April 2017	Contemporary hit radio	Def Jam	
United States	11 April 2017	Urban contemporary	Def Jam	

== See also ==
- Cultural history of the buttocks
