= Team (Iggy Azalea song) =

2016 single by Iggy Azalea

Single by Iggy Azalea
- Released: 18 March 2016
- Recorded: Late 2015
- Genre: Electro hop
- Length: 3:29
- Label: Def Jam
- Songwriters: Amethyst Kelly; Bleta Rexha; Lauren Christy
- Producers: Chordz; Nezzo; Omega

Iggy Azalea singles chronology
"Pretty Girls" (2015)	"Team" (2016)	"Mo Bounce" (2017)

Music video
- "Team" on YouTube

"Team" is a song by Australian rapper Iggy Azalea. It was released on 18 March 2016 as a digital download and serviced to US contemporary hit and rhythmic contemporary radio on 5 April 2016 as the lead single from Azalea's second studio album Digital Distortion. However, the album was later shelved, resulting in "Team" being a stand-alone single. Azalea wrote "Team" with Bebe Rexha, Lauren Christy, among other credited composers, including the main producers, a part of the D.R.U.G.S. collective: Marlon "Chordz" Barrow, Alexander "Nezzo" Palmer and Michael "Omega" Fonseca, with additional contributors Ryan Anthony Avilez, Louis Harden and Brandon "Stix" Salaam-Bailey.

Azalea raps about self-confidence in the track, declaring, "Baby I got me, and that’s all I need, only friend I need," with the rapper later disclosing life and career struggles she had faced during the process of creating the album in an interview. The song contains an interpolation from the 1999 composition "Back That Azz Up", written and performed by Juvenile, Lil Wayne and Mannie Fresh. Upon its release, the song marked Azalea's first solo single in three years. The release was accompanied by the premiere of a dance video version on Azalea's Vevo channel, featuring a cast of dancers performing a choreographed routine, although Azalea herself is absent from the clip. The song's official music video premiered on 31 March 2016.

"Team" reached the top forty in Australia, becoming her ninth single to do so. It debuted and peaked at number forty-two on the US Billboard Hot 100, staying on the chart for eight weeks. The track also earned Azalea's highest debut as a lead act on the Hot Rap Songs chart with its arrival at number eight and was certified Gold by the Recording Industry Association of America (RIAA) later that year. "Team" was nominated for Choice R&B/Hip-Hop Song at the 2016 Teen Choice Awards. As of October 2019, "Team" has garnered over 300 million streams worldwide across all platforms.

== Background and release ==
In October 2015, Azalea announced her second studio album was titled Digital Distortion and set be released in the following year, along with a buzz track titled "Zillion" and the project's lead single premiering before its release. In December, during a Twitter Q&A with fans, she revealed that the lead single would be titled "Team", later sharing a snippet of the track and clarifying: "lead is TEAM. meaning: I've got my own back, I am my own team. 20% meaningful 70% bop 10% ratchet." In March 2016, she announced the song would be released on 18 March and unveiled the single's cover artwork, a "colorfully distorted" portrait of Azalea with a white cap. She also shared a second snippet featuring Azalea chanting the lyrics: "Yeah, that's all I need/ That's all I need/ Baby I got me, only friend I need/ Playing on my team is someone like me."

During an interview with etalk that same month, Azalea commented while talking about her upcoming album, "My first single has no feature on it which was my number one goal, to try to achieve a song which was strong without needing somebody else to sing it." "It was good to get back to doing a song where I only had to consider myself when creating," elaborating later on how her experience influenced the making of the track, "If I'm gonna have everyone try to come at me, then I have to support my own self and I have to be strong on my own and I don't need all of that extra stuff. I'm just gonna rock it myself." On 14 March, she continued teasing the track on Twitter posting another preview addressing: "Kylie Jenner, we know you're technically a Jenner, but you're still a Kardashian in our hearts," with the pun lyrics, "Watch a new car dash/ Call me Kylie." On March 18, a "dance video" for "Team" was uploaded on Azalea's Vevo channel and the song became available for digital download on iTunes. Following the release, it topped the real-time Billboard + Twitter Trending 140 chart, becoming the "most shared and discussed track on the social-media network for five straight hours through noon ET."

== Composition and production ==
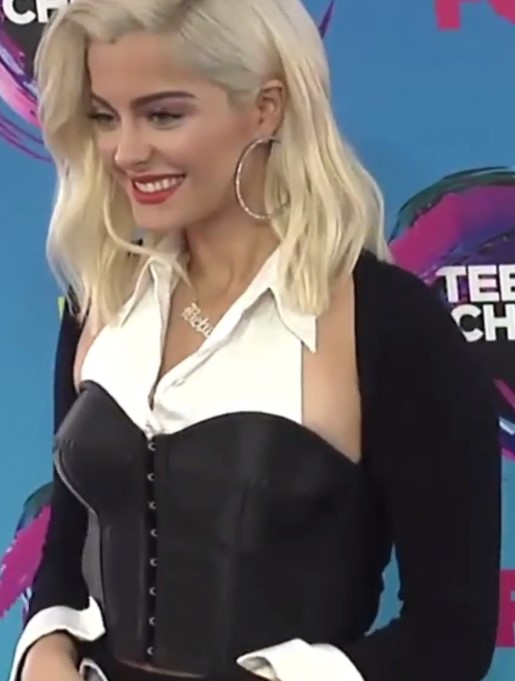
Bebe Rexha co-wrote the song's hook with Azalea and Lauren Christy

"Team" is an electro hop song. The chorus is sung by Azalea; lyrically it discusses the rapper's independence and self-confidence, sung over "commanding, head-knocking" drums according to Rap-Up. Along with the independent woman theme, it also conveys a "warning to not mess with" Azalea's clique. Lewis Corner and Amy Davidson at Digital Spy pondered the song to be "both lonely and inclusive," as Azalea positions herself as "both a one-woman army and a leader ready to recruit." She detailed on the importance of the track by adding, "Looking at the bigger picture, I just think it was important for me to have my own voice – to show growth, to show that I can carry my own song." While promoting the single, Azalea later elaborated in an interview the struggles she had faced in her life and career while working on the project. The song also symbolizes Azalea's comeback to music, claiming she had redefined her focus and relating its message to her life, "That was always a criticism I had. 'She doesn't talk about her own life,' [...] It's just my record and we know what it's about. It's about me. It's very personal."

Azalea wrote the song with Lauren Christy and Bebe Rexha after getting together to work on "some last minute hooks" in late 2015, and was a result of three different meet-ups. It was recorded around October 2015 and produced by Los Angeles-based collective D.R.U.G.S., who handled Azalea's 2011 breakthrough mixtape Ignorant Art, after she asked them to executive produce her second studio album, Digital Distortion, rekindling their relationship in 2015. Marlon "Chordz" Barrow and Alexander "Nezzo" Palmer, who had previously produced Azalea's "Pussy" song together, have main producing credits with Michael "Omega" Fonseca. The track has additional production by Ryan Anthony Avilez and Louis Harden. "Team" contains interpolations during the bridge from the 1999 composition "Back That Azz Up," written and performed by Juvenile, Lil Wayne and Mannie Fresh. Azalea clarified her single did not initially sample the track but sounded similar, prompting her to make "a couple of changes to it and it just felt right to me to embrace it since I felt like it already had that element that sounded like it, instead of trying to move away from it or take something from it. Mannie [Fresh] and everybody hit us up and said that they loved the record, so I'm excited to have like a childhood rap favorite in my new song."

== Critical reception ==
"Team" received mostly favorable reviews from contemporary music critics. Carolyn Menyes of Music Times claimed the track "shows a new sense of independence for [Azalea], both lyrically and by releasing a single where she's the only star, and the hook is undeniable." Writing for Fuse, Jason Lipshutz mentioned Azalea "declares, 'Baby I got me/And that's all I need,' in a moment of snarling independence; the sentiment would have made it impossible for anyone else besides Azalea to handle the song's hook." Gerrick D. Kennedy of the LA Times pointed out its "bouncy, electro beat and an anthemic chorus," continuing "the motivational cut is a light foot stomper that will certainly wedge itself into rotation at pop radio."

Vanessa Jackson from Bustle commented: "If "Team" is a good indication of what's to come, Digital Distortion will be chock full of dance beats and a few well placed disses, naturally." Ian Monroe of V called it "anthemic," predicting she "adds another hit to her discography" while also praising the "impressive" dance video. Angus Walker of HotNewHipHop considered the track "some of Iggy's hardest-sounding material since her early singles, as she delivers animated punchlines atop a glitchy, bass-heavy beat." Matthew Donnelly from PopCrush stated the song is "an immediate sure-thing for radio, and features undulating buzzsaw-bass and Iggy’s own venture into rap-sung territory." Melissa Ruggieri of The Atlanta Journal-Constitution said Azalea "is going directly to the club crowd with this sharply produced thumper." James Grebey of Spin compared it as "a step back from her last release, "Azillion," which was surprisingly fun." Sasha Geffen of MTV.com posted: "Unlike Lorde's "Team," Iggy’s newest track is all about looking out for yourself and being your own biggest cheerleader." Craig Jenkins of Noisey praised its production, distracting from Azalea's delivery, "One minute "Team" is an uptempo EDM-rap hybrid, and the next, it turns into New Orleans bounce, then suddenly there's a trap breakdown."

Time ranked "Team" the third worst song of 2016.

== Music video ==
Azalea confirmed a music video for "Team" was under production in early March 2016, offering an update on the visuals saying, "I finished the edit of "Team" last night and I'm feeling really good about how things turned out. The dancers in the video just give me eternal life. I can't wait for you to see these girls." A "dance video" version premiered on 18 March, featuring some lyrics to the song and eleven "denim-decked dancers, of varying dance backgrounds break[ing] it down while running around in a massive loft space," with Azalea revealing on Twitter the music video would be released in the following week. On 23 March, Azalea previewed the video on Good Morning America.

On 31 March 2016, the music video was uploaded on Azalea's Vevo channel. Directed by Fabien Montique, the visuals start off with Azalea making a break from a crowd in a Ferrari, narrowly escaping the stampede, performing donuts and burnouts to make her way to an airport where she heads through security before meeting up with her team, composed by dancers and supporters, on a private hangar. From there, everyone douses an aircraft in spray paint, covering it with graffiti tags related to her upcoming album "Digital Distortion". Azalea is then also featured in a dance breakdown. The police eventually show up and escort Azalea inside the jet where she comes face to face with an eerily familiar figure with a digitally distorted face that she had encountered along the clip and is now recognized by herself.

Azalea said the clip revolves around several clones of herself and a central theme of "running away from your own self, but then [being] saved by your own self," elaborating that "you always have to mess yourself up and then have a realization and fix it yourself too." She explained the video was not released earlier along with the track as scheduled due to post-production work involving digital distortion on people's faces. Azalea clarified to fans the private plane spray painting was a stance against "the establishment", saying, "The plane is establishment. Spraying it is anti establishment. People are trying to drag me in it. My other selves are [...] media is establishment too technically," falling in line with previous comments she had made about her struggles in the previous year: "I felt like I was definitely not in control of the media's narrative of me. It made me feel very out of control of my own life or my ability to have my own perception of who I was. You don't want someone else writing your narrative and making you the villain."

== Live performances ==
Azalea performed "Team" live for the first time on The Tonight Show Starring Jimmy Fallon on 22 March 2016. She closed the 2016 iHeartRadio Music Awards on 3 April 2016 with a performance of the track. Azalea also performed "Team" on The Ellen DeGeneres Show on 7 April, on the Late Night with Seth Meyers on 28 April and on Good Morning America on 10 June 2016. A pre-taped performance of the song then aired during the eighth season of MTV's Nick Cannon Presents: Wild 'N Out. Azalea performed the song for Miami Beach Gay Pride Parade for her LGBT fans.

== Track listing ==
- Digital download (Clean version)
1. "Team" – 3:29
- Digital download (Explicit version)
1. "Team" – 3:29
- Digital download (Remix)
1. "Team" (Young Bombs Remix) – 4:33

== Charts ==
=== Weekly charts ===
Chart (2016)	Peak position
Australia (ARIA)	40
Belgium Urban (Ultratop Flanders)	27
Canada Hot 100 (Billboard)	41
Canada CHR/Top 40 (Billboard)	40
Czech Republic Singles Digital (ČNS IFPI)	60
France (SNEP)	89
Germany (Deutsche Black Charts)	9
New Zealand Heatseekers (RMNZ)	6
Portugal (AFP)	75
Romania (Airplay 100)	85
Scottish Singles Sales (Official Charts)	43
Slovakia Singles Digital (ČNS IFPI)	51
UK Singles (Official Charts)	62
UK Hip Hop/R&B (Official Charts)	12
US Billboard Hot 100	42
US Dance Airplay (Billboard)	34
US Hot Rap Songs (Billboard)	8
US Pop Airplay (Billboard)	23
US Rhythmic Airplay (Billboard)	35

=== Year-end charts ===
Chart (2016)	Position
Germany (Deutsche Black Charts)	89
US Rap Digital Songs (Billboard)	45

== Certifications ==
Region	Certification	Certified units/sales
Brazil (Pro-Música Brasil)	Platinum	60,000^{‡}
New Zealand (RMNZ)	Gold	15,000^{‡}
United States (RIAA)	Gold	500,000^{‡}
^{‡} Sales+streaming figures based on certification alone.

== Release history ==
Country	Date	Format	Label	Ref.
Worldwide	18 March 2016	Digital download	Def Jam	
United States	5 April 2016	Rhythmic contemporary	Def Jam	
United States	5 April 2016	Contemporary hit radio	Def Jam	
Italy	13 May 2016	Contemporary hit radio	Universal	
Worldwide	13 May 2016	Digital download (Remix)	Def Jam	
