= Gag (disambiguation) =

A gag is a device designed to prevent speech.

Gag or GAG may also refer to:

== Humor ==
- Gag cartoon, a one-panel comic that is usually intended to have ridiculous happenings
  - Yonkoma, a four panel form of Japanese gag comic strip
- Gag gift, an informal term for a practical joke device
- Visual gag, a comedian's term for a joke, a comedic sketch or routine, or the visible effect of a magical illusion
- Running gag, a literary device that repeats in a certain work of literature

== Legal ==
- Gag order, a writ or court order taken out with an intent to prevent information or comment from being made public
- Gag rule, a part of court proceedings and congressional proceedings

== Physical objects ==
- Gag (BDSM), used in BDSM activities
- Gag bit, a type of bit used for strong horses
- Gag (medical device), a device used by dentists, surgeons and veterinarians to hold the patient's mouth open
  - Jennings gag, a form of medical gag
  - Whitehead gag, a form of medical gag
  - Hallam gag, a form of medical gag
- Wind gag, a woolly windscreen put round a microphone to stop it from picking up wind noise

== Biology ==
- Gag reflex, the feeling of choking or accompanying involuntary muscular contractions in the throat
- Glycosaminoglycan (GAG), a polysaccharide that is part of connective tissue
- Group-specific antigen, the genetic material that codes for the core structural proteins of a retrovirus
- Gag grouper, a species of fish
- GAG, one of two codons for glutamic acid

== People ==
- Anton Gag (1859–1908), painter
- Andrei Gag (born 1991), Romanian athlete
- Wanda Gág (1893–1946), children's book writer and illustrator

== Music ==
- Gestört aber GeiL, a German DJ duo from Erfurt
- Gag (album), a 1984 album by Fad Gadget
- Gagged (EP), a 2015 EP by Violet Chachki
- "Gag" (song), a 2013 single by Gen Hoshino
- "G.A.G.", a 2024 song by Stand Atlantic from Was Here

== Other uses ==
- gag, the ISO 639 code for the Gagauz language
- Gag Island, one of the Raja Ampat Islands in Indonesia
- Gage Airport in Gage, Oklahoma (IATA airport code GAG)
- Gays Against Groomers, an American political organization
- The Go-Ahead Group, a British transport company
- Górniczy Agregat Gaśniczy (GAG), a jet engine unit used in mine fires
- Grenfell Action Group, a residents' association at Grenfell Tower, London which caught fire
- Gustav Adolf Grammar School, a school in Estonia
- Grow a Garden, 2025 Roblox video game
