= Gagger =

Gagger is an alternative name for:

- A person or thing that gags
- A gagman, a person who writes or performs gags
- A hot wiener, a type of hot dog popular in Rhode Island

== See also ==
- Gag (disambiguation)
