= Innerpartysystem (album) =

Studio album by Innerpartysystem
- Released: September 29, 2008
- Recorded: Southern California
- Genre: Dance punk, Electronic rock, industrial rock
- Length: 51:11
- Label: Island, Stolen Transmission
- Producer: Joel Hamilton, Mark Needham, Spike Stent, Alan Moulder, Stuart Price

Innerpartysystem chronology
The Download EP (2007)	Innerpartysystem (2008)	Never Be Content (2011)

Professional ratings
Review scores
Source	Rating
Kerrang!	4/5 stars
Sputnikmusic	link

Innerpartysystem is the self-titled debut and only studio album by the electronic rock band Innerpartysystem. The album features two tracks from Innerpartysystem's self-recorded The Download EP, "Don't Stop" and "Heart of Fire", which have been re-recorded and mastered. The album was originally scheduled to be released September 10, 2008 (with an early rough date for June 17) but was pushed back to September 29–30. Rocksound magazine (October 2008) said the band were a mix of industrial-pop and dance music.

== Track listing ==
All tracks composed by Innerpartysystem

No.	Title	Length
1.	"Die Tonight Live Forever"	4:41
2.	"Last Night in Brooklyn"	4:20
3.	"Don't Stop"	4:18
4.	"Structure"	3:58
5.	"Everyone Is the Same"	3:49
6.	"Obsession"	4:20
7.	"This Empty Love"	4:49
8.	"New Poetry"	4:02
9.	"This Town, Your Grave"	4:55
10.	"Heart of Fire"	4:08
11.	"What We Will Never Know"	4:15
12.	"Home" (Instrumental soundscape, hidden on CD)	2:54

== Personnel ==
Innerpartysystem

- Patrick Nissley - programming, vocals, keyboards
- Kris Barman - programming, keyboards, guitar, additional vocals on 1, 5, 7, 9
- Jared Piccone - drums, additional vocals on 1, 3, 6, 9
- Jesse Cronan - keyboards, programming, additional vocals on 1, 4, 9, 10

== Bonus tracks ==
Bonus tracks are available through most online digital music stores via download. "Night Is Alive" first appeared on the band's EP.

US iTunes Bonus Track
No.	Title	Length
13.	"Transmission" (Joy Division cover)	4:41

UK (non-DVD) Bonus Track
No.	Title	Length
11.	"Night Is Alive" (Same as EP track)	4:08
12.	"What We Will Never Know"	4:16
13.	"Home"	2:54

== Bonus UK / Best Buy DVD ==
A bonus DVD is available with the UK version of the album. This DVD is also available with some Best Buy store versions of the album. All the videos on the DVD can be found on the band's official YouTube channel. The DVD contains:

- Die Tonight Live Forever Video
- Don't Stop Video
- An American Band In London
- Southern California
- Spring Break / SXSW
- Talking Berks County
- Innerpartysystem of Mohnton

== Release history ==
Country	Date
United Kingdom	September 29, 2008
United States	September 30, 2008
