= Blackway (rapper) =

Ghanaian rapper

Yaw Sintim-Misa, professionally known as Blackway, is a Ghanaian-American rapper. He is most known for the single "What's Up Danger" which was released as a soundtrack for Spider-Man: Into the Spider-Verse through a collaboration with Black Caviar.

== Early life ==
Blackway is the son of Ghanaian comedian and talk show host, Kwaku Sintim-Misa. He was born in Ghana and lived there until 2006 when he moved from Ghana to stay with his mother in Long Island, New York.

== Career ==
Blackway had a long history of music in Ghana. In 2014, he was featured on "Raise My Flag", the first single of DJ Juls' debut EP. He was also featured on the single "Pretty Please" from Ko-Jo Cue's debut album, "The Shining". In 2015, Blackway was featured on "The Best Shape", which was track 15 on EL's Bar 2 Mixtape. When M.anifest released his album, APAE (The Price of Free) in 2016, he featured Blackway on the 7th single "Never Feel".

It wasn't until 2019 that his biggest breakthrough came when he collaborated with American DJs Black Caviar to release "What's Up Danger" as a soundtrack for Spider-Man: Into the Spider-Verse. It was nominated at the Best Compilation Soundtrack For Visual Media category at the 62nd Grammy Awards. Blackway signed a global record and co-publishing deal with Position/Hive Music in 2022 He released two songs that featured as soundtracks for Madden NFL 24. He was featured by Shaquille O'Neal on his 2023 single, "King Talk" Also in 2023, he was featured on "The Return of Mansa Musa" on the tenth track of Busta Rhymes' album Blockbusta alongside Swizz Beatz.
