= Black caviar (disambiguation) =

Black caviar typically refers to any black-colored variety of caviar.

Black caviar may also refer to:

- Black Caviar, a racehorse
- Black Caviar (duo), an American DJ duo

== See also ==
- Black Caviar Lightning, a horse race
