= ROTIGS =

Medical device

The Rapid Oral Tracheal Intubation Guidance System (ROTIGS) is a medical device that facilitates intubation.

ROTIGS medical device

== History ==
The device was invented in 2007 by otolaryngologist Brad Napier and is currently being tested at several universities in the United States. The device functions as a bite block and a mechanical guide for transoral intubation, as it awakens intubations in ways that existing oral airways do not. ROTIGS is currently patent pending in the United States, Japan and the European Union.

== Significance ==
The device provides a new tool for the management of difficult airways and it facilitates Awake Minimally Invasive Bronchoscopic Intubation (AMIBI). ROTIGS uses a new approach to managing difficult airways. The design several medical applications beyond its original intended use as an appliance to allow awake intubation.

== Medical applications ==
ROTIGS is a transoral appliance that facilitates awake transoral bronchoscopic intubation, laryngoscopy, bronchoscopy, and esophagoscopy. Rotigs consists of a mouthpiece, bite block, and guidance tube. The mouthpiece and integral bite block keeps the device centered and allows a midline bronchoscopic approach to the larynx. The device does not rest on the tongue and does not cause gagging. By creating a gag free approach to the larynx, ROTIGS facilitates safe, awake, guided transoral intubation for the infrequent endoscopist.
