= Molly's Game (soundtrack) =

Molly's Game (Original Motion Picture Soundtrack)

Film score by Daniel Pemberton
- Released: January 5, 2018
- Recorded: 2017
- Studios: Soup Studios, London; Snap Studios, London; Abbey Road Studios, London; Smecky Music Studios, Prague
- Genre: Film score
- Length: 55:03
- Label: Sony Classical
- Producer: Daniel Pemberton

Daniel Pemberton chronology
Black Mirror: USS Callister (2017)	Molly's Game (2017)	Ocean's 8 (2018)

Molly's Game (Original Motion Picture Soundtrack) is the film score composed by Daniel Pemberton to the 2018 film Molly's Game directed by Aaron Sorkin and starred Jessica Chastain, Idris Elba, Kevin Costner, Michael Cera, Jeremy Strong, Chris O'Dowd, Joe Keery, Brian D'Arcy James, and Bill Camp. The film score was released through Sony Classical Records on January 5, 2018.

== Development ==
Daniel Pemberton composed the film score for Molly's Game. Pemberton previously worked with Sorkin on the latter's writing assignment Steve Jobs (2015), and he liked the score and during the 73rd Golden Globe Awards, where he and Sorkin attended the ceremony with Molly Bloom, Sorkin asked Pemberton to score the film which he agreed. Pemberton noted he was amazed on how Sorkin was comfortable as a director and was supportive and enthusiastic throughout the process.

Firstly, Sorkin needed a big orchestral score, but Pemberton denied and felt that Molly's character needed a contemporary score which felt like a rock band or a modern act, to provide a jazzy feel. He wanted the score to be felt like it was written by a band than a film composer but also sound like that particular band having the skills of a film composer to make it all work out. He did not look at Molly's character to have a femininity as she was a strong-minded person and would have given the same treatment if the character was either male or female but had definite moments where he had to give the score a sensual and emotional edge for other characters.

Pemberton wrote a theme to describe her emotional moments, which has been written on a baritone guitar. But they had to change it a little as it sounded even more western than what was in the final version. Pemberton wrote a piece of the ending which took him a bit of reverse engineering to take the thematic ideas from that and then translate them elsewhere in the film. Dialogues had been considered an important point in the film, and musically Pemberton wanted to give space to the dialogues and match the tempo, so that it provides a unique personality.

== Reception ==
A reviewer based at Film Music Central wrote "If you've enjoyed Pemberton's work up to this point, then his score for Molly's Game will please you immensely [...] It's refreshing to listen to film scores that aren't loaded to the gills with symphonic instruments and pounding drums." Tall Writer of Seattle Post-Intelligencer wrote "Daniel Pemberton's soundtrack to the film Molly's Game is a highly recommended (3.5 stars), intricate work that rewards the listener and tremendously enhances the visuals". Wendy Ide of Screen International wrote "An understated score comes a distant second place to the words that the characters wield". Callie Petch of Set the Tape called it a "relatively anonymous score".

Todd McCarthy of The Hollywood Reporter and Peter Debruge of Variety called it a "tense" and "bombastic" score. Courtney Howard of Fresh Fiction wrote "Daniel Pemberton's score augments the narrative, giving a propulsive overture to the action." A reviewer based at Fame wrote "There's a very consistent theme throughout the soundtrack, with driving rhythms, pounding bass and impressive use of percussion coming together to emulate the slick style of the film's story and dialogue."

== Track listing ==
No.	Title	Length
1.	"Staring Down a Mountain"	3:56
2.	"Raided"	2:15
3.	"Molly's Journey"	1:56
4.	"Set It Up"	2:45
5.	"Play Your Hand"	2:46
6.	"Area Codes"	2:31
7.	"Cut the Pack"	2:55
8.	"Red & Black"	2:39
9.	"Pocket Kings"	1:51
10.	"The Rake"	2:11
11.	"House of Cards"	3:57
12.	"It Had to End"	2:25
13.	"The Playmates"	2:20
14.	"The Russians"	3:22
15.	"Molly's Dream"	1:05
16.	"Intruder"	2:53
17.	"Scars"	3:02
18.	"Beyond Your Means"	2:24
19.	"Therapy Session"	2:43
20.	"All the Beauty in the World"	5:07
Total length:		55:03

== Credits ==
Credits adapted from liner notes:

- Music composer and producer: Daniel Pemberton
- Recording engineer: Robin Baynton, Vítek Král
- Recording studios: Soup Studio and Snap Studio, London, Smecky Studios, Prague, Czech Republic
- Orchestration: Andrew Skeet
- Mixing engineer: Sam Okell
- Mixing studio: Abbey Road Studios, London
- Music editor: Carlton Kaller
- Additional recordings: by The City of Prague Philharmonic Orchestra
- Orchestra contractor: James Fitzpatrick
- Music supervisor: Sean Mulligan, Carlton Kaller
- Musical assistance: Jonny Sims
- Guitars: Leo Abrahams, Daniel Pemberton
- Drums: Alex Thomas
- Bass: Jonathan Noyce
