= Don't Stop (Innerpartysystem song) =

Single by Innerpartysystem

from the album Innerpartysystem
- B-side: "Redemption"; "Transmission" (cover)
- Released: June 30, 2008
- Recorded: Los Angeles, California; Reading, Pennsylvania in 2008
- Genre: Industrial music
- Length: 4:22
- Label: Stolen Transmission
- Songwriter: Innerpartysystem
- Producers: Mark Needham; Innerpartysystem

Innerpartysystem singles chronology
"Don't Stop" (2008)	"Die Tonight Live Forever" (2008)

Re-Release Cover
- 2009 Re-Release Cover

"Don't Stop" is the debut single by the American band Innerpartysystem from the band's self-titled debut album. Before being mastered the song was officially released on the band's debut EP (although an earlier demo had been published on the band's MySpace profile beforehand). The single was re-released mainly due to poor endorsement by American music channels.

The lyrics of the song focus on celebrity culture and lies within the media and celebrities. The lyrics are sung in first person as a celebrity who may have no specific talent or is famous purely because of his/her wealth (famous for being famous) and this person is only interested in the attention to which a celebrity may receive, in the song these people are perceived as liars. The song portrays these celebrities as the public's entertainment and the public wrongly feed these celebrities with their attention.

The physical platforms of the single were only released in the United Kingdom.

The single peaked at #35 on the Billboard Hot Modern Rock Tracks in 2008

== Music video ==
=== Version one ===
A typical frame from the video: The female news reporter in the music video with Patrick Nissley in the left hand corner. Showing how the video takes a typical television news report and distorts it with strange editing and sharp effects.

The music video for "Don't Stop" was directed and produced by Stephen Penta for White Light Productions. It features a male and a female news reporter who both lip sync the song's lyrics at various times throughout the video. The video in most parts was edited with analog tape distortion from a CRT television effects giving the video a rough and rigid look. Throughout the video the band members are seen lip syncing the lyrics (mainly the vocalist Patrick) as well as shots from a live performance.

Jared Piccone on the filming of the video:

We made this video with our manager Penta, who's made all of our videos up until now, for almost no budget back when we were on [the] Stolen Transmission [record label], the band footage is in our basement and the white band footage was shot against a white wall in our kitchen with a camcorder. All the newsroom footage was shot in BCTV, our local public access news station. We talked them into letting us use the studio on an off day.

The video had some controversy when being published by TV networks as many demanded the video be cut to reduce flashing so the video could pass the Harding Test. MTV UK also demanded that the ball gag and mouth opening device be cut from the video for the video to be played during day.

The music video can be found on a bonus DVD with the album, on the CD single and on the band's website.

=== Version two ===
After the original video was found to be too shocking for many musical channels, and the fact that the flashing was excessive enough to cause a warning to appear on some music channels, a new video was filmed. The video was again filmed and edited by the band's videographer Stephan Penta.

The video shows a couple watching a 1950s style talk show where the host insults his female cohost and introduces the band who perform a live performance. During the performance, actors move and dance in an animated doll-like motion as if to emphasive surreality of the show. Like the first video, it was shot with a low budget and features the news reporters from the first video, this time playing as an audience.

== Track listing ==
The single contains many B-sides and remixes available on different platforms. The song Redemption can be found as a B-side on the CD track list, this is a mastered version of the earlier "Niterider", with slight changes to the song's drum beats. The B-side on the Vinyl is a cover of Joy Division's song Transmission, mixed in a more electronic fashion.

CD track list
No.	Title	Writer(s)	Length
1.	"Don't Stop"	Innerpartysystem	4:22
2.	"Redemption"	Innerpartysystem	3:35
3.	"Don't Stop [video]"		4:19

7" vinyl track list
No.	Title	Writer(s)	Length
1.	"Don't Stop" (A-side)		4:22
2.	"Transmission" (B-side, Cover)	Joy Division	3:35

Digital download EP track list
No.	Title	Writer(s)	Length
1.	"Don't Stop (radio edit)"	Innerpartysystem	4:20
2.	"Don't Stop (Caged Baby mix)"		7:11
3.	"Don't Stop (Caged Baby radio mix)"		3:19
4.	"Don't Stop (Caged Baby Beatnick mix)"		5:12

== Release history ==
Country	Date	Version
United Kingdom	30 June 2008	Original
United Kingdom	9 February 2009	Re-release

== Covers ==
'Don't Stop' was covered by American rock band The Anix during their live performance at The Glass House in Pomona, California on December 18, 2015.

== Notes ==
- A vinyl version of the single was also released as a special 7" vinyl made out of chocolate (which played) which was available with the pre-order of the CD single.
- The song was featured on the football video game FIFA Street 3 in winter 2008.
- In the summer of 2008, the song was featured in the video game Madden 2009, which was released on all major systems.
- The audio and visual act Eclectic-method created a remix video for the song as well as a small flash real-time mash-up video creator.
- An earlier longer demo version of the song can be found on the internet, the demo version features a different chorus as well as an extra verse.
- When the band performs live the song is typically played last.
- The song was used by the Dallas Stars during the 2008-09 season when they play their introduction video.
- The Binghamton Senators also used the song in their second introduction video during the 2009-2010 season.
