= Kwaku Sintim-Misa =

Ghanaian comedian (born 1956)

- Born: 1956 (age 69–70); Kumasi, Ghana
- Education: Prempeh College; New York University
- Occupations: Actor, TV director, satirist, talk show host, and author
- Children: 4, including Blackway (rapper)

Kwaku Sintim-Misa aka "KSM" (born 1956) is a Ghanaian actor, director, satirist, talk show host, and author. He also has his shows on radio and television. He is the host of The KSM Show.

== Early life ==
KSM was born the fifth of six siblings on December 5, 1956, in the city of Kumasi. He attended UST Primary School, the Presbyterian Boys' Senior High School, and Prempeh College. After completing college, he received specialized training at the renowned National Film and Television Institute in Accra Ghana.

Anxious for deeper knowledge in performing arts, KSM left Africa to major in acting and directing at Trinity College in Connecticut, United States. He subsequently earned a Master of Fine Arts in film production from New York University.

== Career ==
KSM launched his acting career with a variety of Off-Broadway and Public Theatre roles. He also appeared in the American crime series Law & Order and on the drama series Medal of Honor Rag (by the Tony Award winning director Lloyd Richards.) KSM became the first African to stage an original Off-Broadway play when he produced Thoughts of a Confused Black Man, a one-man show about race in the United States. In 1997 he returned to Ghana. Shortly after arriving back in the country, KSM became a radio talk show host; his work with Talk Shop introduced Ghana to broadcasting's potential for generating controversy and dialogue. KSM used a combative, confrontational style which shocked his listeners into discussing relevant national issues. He continued to refine his style with the show Nyame Som Ye De, which inspired Ghanaians to think beyond religion to define their broader spirituality.

After working as a radio host, KSM created the talk show Thank God It’s Friday (TGIF). TGIF was a broadcast that fused serious talk, education, and humor. KSM won the Radio and Television Personality Television Entertainment Show Host of the Year (2011) for his work with TGIF.

KSM has written, directed, and starred in a series of one-man comedic plays, most notably Saga of a Returnee, Afia Siriboe, and Politically Incorrect. KSM's live performances use comical characters to illustrate the key social, economic, and political issues concerning Ghana. They are produced by Sapphire Ghana Limited, a content development company that he founded and uses to integrate social issues into television, radio, and stage productions.

In 2009, KSM released his first feature-length film, a psychological thriller entitled Double. He has written and produced a variety of television shows, including Hot Bench, Divorce Court, Action Security, and several medical documentaries. Ogya FM is his latest television series, which was created to educate the public on the power of advocating for change. Ogya FM was recently shown at the Panafrican Film and Television Festival of Ouagadougou in Burkina Faso.

== Personal life ==
Sintim-Misa was born to Rt. Rev. Godfried Kwadwo Sintim-Misa, a former Moderator of the Presbyterian Church of Ghana, and Mary Oforiwaa Sintim-Misa. He is married with five children including rapper Blackway.

== External links and source ==
- Kwaku Sintim-Misa on Ghana Home Page
- Kwaku Sintim-Misa onYEN Home Page
