= Beau Young Prince =

American rapper

- Also known as: BYP
- Born: Beau Young; November 3, 1993 (age 32)
- Origin: Washington, D.C.
- Genres: Hip hop
- Occupation: Rapper
- Instrument: Vocals
- Years active: 2017–present
- Label: Def Jam

Beau Young (born November 3, 1993), popularly known as Beau Young Prince, is an American rapper from Washington D.C, signed to Def Jam Recordings. His breakthrough single, "Kill Moe", was released in 2018. He received a Grammy nomination for the song "Let Go", which was featured on the Spider-Man: Into the Spider-Verse soundtrack and went multi-platinum. In addition, he wrote and sung the song "Move the Chains" for the Madden NFL 21 soundtrack. His song "Ya get me" is a soundtrack in the third episode of the third season of "Tulsa King"

== Music career ==
Beau Young Prince's first hit single, "Kill Moe", was released in 2018 a few months after he signed on to Def Jam Records. Reviewer Jackson Howard of Pitchfork criticized the song's uninspired lyrics but praised his vocal style, describing it as "believable and genuine". Along with Spider-Man: Into the Spider-Verse, his songs were also featured in Coming 2 America and The Hate U Give.

== Discography ==
=== Singles ===
List of singles
Year	Title
2018	"Let Go"
2018	"Price"
2018	"Kill Moe"
2022	"Oops"

== Awards and nominations ==
List of awards and nominations for Beau Young Prince
Year	Award	Categories	Result
2020	Grammy Awards	Best Compilation Soundtrack for Visual Media	Nominated
