= Spider-Man: Into the Spider-Verse (soundtrack) =

2018 film soundtrack

The soundtrack for the 2018 American animated superhero film Spider-Man: Into the Spider-Verse, based on the Miles Morales incarnation of the Marvel Comics character Spider-Man and produced by Sony Pictures Animation, consists of a soundtrack featuring original songs written for and inspired by the film and an original score composed by Daniel Pemberton. The soundtrack was released under the title Spider-Man: Into the Spider-Verse (Soundtrack from & Inspired by the Motion Picture) under the Republic Records label on December 14, 2018, while Pemberton's score was released as Spider-Man: Into the Spider-Verse (Original Score) under the Sony Classical label three days later.

The Japanese version has its own theme song titled “P.S. RED I” by TK from Ling Tosite Sigure.

== Soundtrack ==
Spider-Man: Into the Spider-Verse (Soundtrack from & Inspired by the Motion Picture)

Soundtrack album by various artists
- Released: December 14, 2018
- Genres: Hip hop; pop; trap
- Length: 50:10
- Label: Republic
- Producers: Avedon; Bantu; Ben Billions; Black Caviar; Blackway; Breyan Isaac; Carl Rushing; Carter Lang; Didier Cohen; DJ Khalil; Infamous; Jahaan Sweet; Jailo; John Cunningham; Kyduh; Louis Bell; OmArr; Om'Mas Keith; Pierre PD DeJournette; Neil Blanco; Pip Kembo; RayAyy; Rick Nowels; Stermstyle; Syk Sense; Take a Daytrip; Young Fyre

Singles from Spider-Man: Into the Spider-Verse (Soundtrack from & Inspired by the Motion Picture)
- 1. "Sunflower" Released: October 18, 2018; 2. "What's Up Danger" Released: November 1, 2018

The soundtrack features songs performed by an array of artists, including Vince Staples, Jaden Smith, Nicki Minaj, Lil Wayne, Ski Mask the Slump God, Ty Dolla Sign, Post Malone, Swae Lee, Anuel AA, Thutmose, Coi Leray, Shaboozey, the now-late Juice Wrld, and the late XXXTentacion. The soundtrack was supported by the singles "Sunflower" and "What's Up Danger". It was released by Republic Records on December 14, 2018, the same day as the film's theatrical release. A deluxe version of the soundtrack, with remix versions of "Sunflower" and "Scared of the Dark" as bonus tracks, was released on February 22, 2019. The soundtrack's music was made to represent "what a teen like [lead character Miles Morales] is listening to across the country."

== Development and release ==
In November, Nicki Minaj revealed that she had written a song for the film. It was later revealed that the song is titled "Familia" and that it features Anuel AA and Bantu. The soundtrack was curated to represent what a teen like Morales would listen to.

In October, Post Malone revealed on The Tonight Show Starring Jimmy Fallon that he had written a song for the film titled "Sunflower", which Billboard described as a "funky, dreamy ballad". The song, which is co-performed by Swae Lee, was released on October 18 and became a critical hit, tying with Maroon 5 and Cardi B's "Girls Like You" and Ed Sheeran's "Shape of You" for the then-record for most weeks in the Billboard Hot 100's Top 10, at 33 weeks, and was nominated for Record of the Year at the 62nd Grammy Awards.

A second single, titled "What's Up Danger" and performed by Blackway and Black Caviar, was released on November 1, 2018. Blackway said that "[b]eing presented with the opportunity to be a part of this project is probably the coolest thing that has ever happened to [him]", while Black Caviar claimed that "when the opportunity to write a song for the new Spider-Man: Into the Spider-Verse film came up, [their] 10-year-old selves were freaking out".

The film's soundtrack and score were blended together; an example of this can be found in the scene featuring Miles Morales taking a leap of faith. In the scene, the song "What's Up Danger," performed by Blackway and Black Caviar, fades into Pemberton's score, with the latter taking over the end of the scene. The soundtrack is additionally featured diegetically, such as when Miles sings along to "Sunflower" during the beginning of the film.

=== Critical reception ===
Professional ratings
Review scores
Source	Rating
AllMusic	4/5 stars

Aaron Williams of Uproxx said that the soundtrack understands the necessity of representing positively the title character's ethnic group, stating it "services this idea as admirably as the film's titular character does the legacy of his revered namesake", calling it "one of the best hip-hop-oriented film soundtracks ever created". He called "Memories" "the sound of the vibrant culture of the melting pot", something he felt was also present in "Familia" which he called "a reggaeton track that Miles would almost certainly enjoy listening to alongside his streetwise, Puerto Rican mother Rio". He also stated that "[t]he most impressive part is how the compilation hangs together as its own separate body of work". The first film's blending of Pemberton's score and the soundtrack was commended. Observer's Dylan Roth wrote that Pemberton's score weaved "perfectly between or even through the film's pop songtrack." Roth further commented that the emotional climax featuring Miles taking a leap from a skyscraper "has become an iconic moment [in] recent cinema thanks in no small part to the interplay between Pemberton's orchestrated themes and 'What's Up Danger'". James Whitbrook of Gizmodo wrote that Into the Spider-Verse featured "a seamless blend of licensed work featuring songs from artists like Post Malone and Lil Wayne, plus Daniel Pemberton's sprawling original music, spanning symphonic orchestral work to wailing rock guitars and eclectic electronic beats." Writing for Collider, Patrick Caoile referred to "Sunflower" as synonymous with Into the Spider-Verse.

== Track listing ==
Spider-Man: Into the Spider-Verse (Soundtrack from & Inspired by the Motion Picture)
No.	Title	Writer(s)	Producer(s)	Length
1.	"What's Up Danger" (Blackway and Black Caviar)	Yaw Sintim-Misa; Jared Piccone	Black Caviar; Blackway	3:42
2.	"Sunflower" (Post Malone and Swae Lee)	Austin Post; Khalif Brown; Louis Bell; Carter Lang; William Walsh; Shaman Brown; Carl Rosen	Bell; Lang	2:38
3.	"Way Up" (Jaden Smith)	Jaden Smith; Omarr Rambert; Tremaine Winfrey	Rambert; Young Fyre	2:33
4.	"Familia" (Nicki Minaj and Anuel AA featuring Bantu)	Onika Maraj; Emmanuel Gazmey; Tinashe Sibanda; Philip Kembo; Carlos Suárez	Bantu; Kembo	2:54
5.	"Invincible" (Aminé)	Adam Daniel; Om'Mas Keith; Dylan Meek	Keith	3:16
6.	"Start a Riot" (Duckwrth and Shaboozey)	Jared Lee; Collins Chibueze; Breyan Isaac; Alec Appoloni	Isaac; Kyduh^{[a]}	2:51
7.	"Hide" (Juice Wrld featuring Seezyn)	Jarad Higgins; Carl Chaney; George Dickinson	PD Beats; Neil Blanco	3:25
8.	"Memories" (Thutmose)	Umar Ibrahim; Vincent van Ende	Avedon	3:19
9.	"Save the Day" (Ski Mask the Slump God and Jacquees featuring Coi Leray and LouGotCash)	Stokeley Goulbourne; Rodriquez Broadnax; Coi Collins; Rahlou Ruth; Raymond Arroyo	Arroyo	2:58
10.	"Let Go" (Beau Young Prince)	Beau Young; Jaimy Lageweg	Jailo; Carl Rushing^{[c]}	2:57
11.	"Scared of the Dark" (Lil Wayne and Ty Dolla Sign featuring XXXTentacion)	Dwayne Carter Jr.; Jahseh Onfroy; Marco Rodriguez-Diaz Jr.; Samuel Martin; Alexander Izquierdo	Ben Billions; Infamous; John Cunningham^{[c]}	3:52
12.	"Elevate" (DJ Khalil featuring Denzel Curry, Cordae, SwaVay and Trev Rich)	Khalil Hazzard; Denzel Curry; Cordae Dunston; André Jones; Trevor Rich; Didier Cohen; Daniel Seeff	DJ Khalil; Didier^{[b]}	3:39
13.	"Home" (Vince Staples)	Vincent Staples; David Biral; Denzel Baptiste	Take a Daytrip	3:31
Total length:				41:35

Deluxe Edition – Bonus Tracks
No.	Title	Writer(s)	Producer(s)	Length
14.	"Sunflower (Remix)" (Post Malone, Swae Lee, Nicky Jam and Prince Royce)	Post; Brown; Nick Rivera; Geoffrey Rojas; Jean Rodríguez; Bell; Lang; Walsh; Rosen	Bell; Lang; G.O Kings Bred^{[d]}	3:30
15.	"Scared of the Dark (Remix)" (Lil Wayne, Ty Dolla Sign and Ozuna featuring XXXTentacion)	Carter; Juan Ozuna; Onfroy; Benjamin Diehl; Vicente Saavedra; Rodriguez-Diaz; Martin; Izquierdo	Ben Billions; Infamous; John Cunningham^{[c]}	5:05
Total length:				50:10

Remixes not in the album
No.	Title	Writer(s)	Producer(s)	Length
1.	"What's Up Danger (Black Caviar Remix)"	Yaw Sintim-Misa; Jared Piccone	Black Caviar; Blackway	3:18

Notes

- ^{^[a]} indicates an additional producer
- ^{^[b]} indicates a co-producer
- ^{^[c]} indicates a vocal producer
- ^{^[d]} indicates a remixer
- "Way Up" features background vocals by Tyler Cole & OmArr
- "Familia" features background vocals by Pip Kembo
- "Start a Riot" features background vocals by Breyan Isaac
- "Hide" features background vocals by Carl Chaney

== Charts ==
The Spider-Man: Into the Spider-Verse soundtrack debuted at number five on the US Billboard 200 with 52,000 album-equivalent units, including 14,000 in pure album sales. In the week ending January 17, 2019, the soundtrack moved up to its peak position at number two, mainly due to its lead single "Sunflower" hitting number one on the US Billboard Hot 100.

=== Weekly charts ===
Chart (2018–2019)	Peak position
Australian Albums (ARIA)	11
Belgian Albums (Ultratop Flanders)	110
Canadian Albums (Billboard)	3
Danish Albums (Hitlisten)	7
Dutch Albums (Album Top 100)	58
Finnish Albums (Suomen virallinen lista)	13
Italian Compilation Albums (FIMI)	2
New Zealand Albums (RMNZ)	10
Norwegian Albums (VG-lista)	4
US Billboard 200	2
US Top R&B/Hip-Hop Albums (Billboard)	2
US Top Soundtracks (Billboard)	1

=== Year-end charts ===
Chart (2019)	Position
Australian Albums (ARIA)	100
Canadian Albums (Billboard)	17
Danish Albums (Hitlisten)	40
US Billboard 200	15
US Top R&B/Hip-Hop Albums (Billboard)	8
US Soundtrack Albums (Billboard)	3

Chart (2020)	Position
US Soundtrack Albums (Billboard)	13

Chart (2021)	Position
US Soundtrack Albums (Billboard)	12

Chart (2022)	Position
US Soundtrack Albums (Billboard)	21

Chart (2023)	Position
US Soundtrack Albums (Billboard)	24

=== Decade-end charts ===
Chart (2010–2019)	Position
US Billboard 200	125

=== Certifications ===
Region	Certification	Certified units/sales
Denmark (IFPI Danmark)	Platinum	20,000^{‡}
New Zealand (RMNZ)	Gold	7,500^{‡}
United Kingdom (BPI)	Gold	100,000^{‡}
United States (RIAA)	3× Platinum	3,000,000^{‡}
^{‡} Sales+streaming figures based on certification alone.

== Score ==
Spider-Man: Into the Spider-Verse (Original Score)

Film score by Daniel Pemberton
- Released: December 17, 2018
- Studio: Sony Music Masterworks
- Length: 81:00
- Label: Sony Classical

Daniel Pemberton chronology
Ocean's 8 (2018)	Spider-Man: Into the Spider-Verse (Original Score) (2018)	Yesterday (Original Motion Picture Soundtrack) (2019)

In July 2018, Daniel Pemberton was revealed to be scoring Into the Spider-Verse. Pemberton said that "It has been such a pleasure to enter the Spider-Verse with such an amazing array of collaborators and truly ground-breaking directors", and said that "[he felt] so lucky to have been a part of it and to have the opportunity to create a whole new musical universe for one of the world's most beloved superheroes – Spider-Man". Spring Aspers, head of music and creative affairs at Sony Pictures, praised Pemberton's score, calling it "a perfect blend of influences that captures Miles Morales's Brooklyn world and the film's inclusive, optimistic message of heroism: that when it's time to step up, anyone can wear the mask". The score was released in both CD and digital formats, with the digital format featuring additional tracks to the CD version.

Pemberton was "initially skeptical that a big-budget animated superhero movie would be a welcome venue for his experimentation."

Pemberton's score combined various elements, including "the expected orchestra with trap beats, scratching, and other hip hop and turntablist elements." Another element found in Into's score included the clacking of a computer keyboard being featured in a set piece. The motif for the Kingpin (or Wilson Fisk) is performed by a click-pen. The score featured a noted usage of turntable scratching. In his cover notes for the album, Pemberton elaborated that the idea of "using sounds generated on a DJ turntable as a key element" in the score came about after his consideration of the type of music a teenager would be listening to. As the film's story becomes more centered around action, the score leans more into its orchestral elements, though its hip-hop and scratching elements continue throughout.

Pemberton elaborated that to "scratch the orchestra", the team working on the film's music would "go record and mix all the live players - then get it transferred to 'vinyl' - then spend ages putting the notes back in the mix bar by bar with the amazing [DJ Blakey]". The two used the Serato DJ software to "virtually spin and scratch the uncompressed orchestral recording." Included in the score is a sound effect associated with the Prowler character, which Pemberton created by processing elephant trumpeting through an audio filter. The score also included "a lot of sound-effect- like layers that fuel what the sound effects are doing."

The score's first track, "Into the Spider-Verse" has a soundscape that is layered by a "crescendo leading to a veritable explosion of scratching sounds." The score further establishes hip-hop elements, including drum kit, electronic, orchestral, and percussion elements. The "Green Goblin Fight" track "is part EDM and introduces a bunch of truly scary electronic howls." Later, "The Amazing Spider-Man" invokes a heroic theme that includes a three-note leitmotif. Though including leitmotifs, Pemberton has stated "A theme doesn't necessarily have to be a melodic leitmotif; it can be a sort of crazy noise. In the first film, we had that with the Prowler. The Prowler noise is very recognizable, and it's a theme, but it's just a crazy noise. Whereas Miles has themes that are more traditional, musical, melodic themes."

=== Track listing ===
All music composed by Daniel Pemberton.

Spider-Man: Into the Spider-Verse (Original Score)
No.	Title	Length
1.	"Into the Spider-Verse"	0:59
2.	"Only One Spider-Man"	2:13
3.	"Visions Brooklyn 1, 2, 3"	3:17
4.	"Security Guard"	1:06
5.	"Comic Book"	0:44
6.	"Green Goblin Fight"	2:12
7.	"The Amazing Spider-Man"	1:56
8.	"The Collider"	1:14
9.	"Destiny"	2:46
10.	"Escape the Subway"	1:56
11.	"Mi Amor"	1:19
12.	"Spider-Training"	1:23
13.	"Rest In Peace"	1:20
14.	"My Name Is Peter B. Parker"	0:52
15.	"For The Love of MJ"	0:38
16.	"Peter Enters the Spider-Verse"	1:36
17.	"Cemetery Splat"	0:37
18.	"Catch the S Train"	1:55
19.	"Quantum Physics"	1:20
20.	"Gimme the Goober"	1:15
21.	"Alchemax Infiltration Plan"	1:47
22.	"Alchemax Arrival"	2:17
23.	"Spider-Man Science"	2:06
24.	"Take the Computer and Run"	1:25
25.	"Are You Ready to Swing?"	3:09
26.	"Gwen Enters the Spider-Verse"	0:46
27.	"Kingpin Clicks"	1:37
28.	"Aunt May and the Spider-Shed"	3:54
29.	"The Prowler"	2:45
30.	"Breakdown the House.."	2:27
31.	"..and Tear off the Roof"	2:30
32.	"On Your Way"	2:18
33.	"The Team Leaves"	1:57
34.	"This Spark in You"	2:10
35.	"Spider-Team Mission"	1:44
36.	"MJ In the Restaurant"	0:54
37.	"Suicide Squad"	1:46
38.	"Miles Morales Returns"	3:45
39.	"Saying Goodbye"	1:49
40.	"Shut It Down"	1:15
41.	"Kingpin Fight"	2:59
42.	"Shoulder Touch"	2:33
43.	"Aftermath"	1:26
44.	"Spider-Man Loves You"	1:51
Total length:		1:21:00

== A Very Spidey Christmas ==
A Very Spidey Christmas

EP by various artists
- Released: December 21, 2018
- Genre: Christmas
- Length: 10:56
- Labels: Madison Gate; Masterworks

Singles from A Very Spidey Christmas
- 1. "Spidey-Bells (A Hero's Lament)" Released: December 20, 2018; 2. "Deck the Halls" Released: December 20, 2018

Sony Pictures Animation revealed that an extended play album based on a throwaway joke featured in Into the Spider-Verse was set to be released on December 21, 2018. Producer Phil Lord was unaware of Chris Pine's ability to sing prior to recording. The EP, titled A Very Spidey Christmas, features 5 Christmas-based songs performed by cast members Chris Pine, Shameik Moore, Jake Johnson, and Jorma Taccone. The EP features a cover of the song "Jingle Bells" titled "Spidey-Bells (A Hero's Lament)", performed by Pine, which was featured on the film's end credits. A cover of "Deck the Halls" by Johnson is also featured in the EP. Both songs were released as singles on December 20, 2018.

=== Track listing ===
No.	Title	Artist(s)	Length
1.	"Joy to the World"	Shameik Moore	1:40
2.	"Spidey-Bells (A Hero’s Lament)"	Chris Pine	2:41
3.	"Deck the Halls"	Jake Johnson	2:05
4.	"Up on the House Top"	Chris Pine	1:45
5.	"The Night Before Christmas 1967 (Spoken Word)"	Jorma Taccone	2:45
Total length:			10:56

== See also ==
- Spider-Man: Across the Spider-Verse (soundtrack)
