= The KSM Show =

The KSM Show is a weekly entertainment programme in Ghana hosted by Kwaku Sintim-Misa.
