= Innerpartysystem =

American electronic rock band

- Innerpartysystem performing in 2009 at the Apple Store on Regent Street, London

Background information
- Origin: Mohnton, Pennsylvania, United States
- Genres: Electronic rock, industrial music
- Years active: 2006–2011 (hiatus)
- Labels: Island; Red Bull
- Members: Patrick Nissley; Jared Piccone
- Past members: Jesse Cronan; Eric Firsching; Kris "Wuki" Barman
- Website: innerpartysystem.com

Innerpartysystem (often stylized as InnerPartySystem) is an American electronic rock band. The group consists of Patrick Nissley, Jared Piccone and Kris Barman. The band is well known for their live performance lighting largely by Andrew Nissley and videos directed by Stephen Penta.

The band was named for a term used in the George Orwell novel Nineteen Eighty-Four.

Their debut EP The Download EP was released in November 2007 and their debut self-titled album in late September 2008. As of late 2008 the band started releasing seasonal mixtapes, new remixes including Ladyhawke's track "Paris Is Burning" and Katy Perry's "Hot n Cold". In May 2009 the band digitally released the UK equivalent of The Download EP, entitled Heart of Fire. As of October 2009, the band worked towards their EP Never Be Content, which was released in February 2011.

After rumours circulated the internet on Jesse Cronan leaving the band, it was confirmed on March 3, 2010 by a blog post by Cronan. Cronan stated that his reasons for leaving were because he felt "unsatisifed and unmotivated".

On August 3, 2011, Innerpartysystem issued a statement that the band was going on indefinite hiatus. They performed their last shows at the end of August.

== Origin of name ==
Explaining the origin of the band name, Piccone is quoted as saying:

In George Orwell's Nineteen Eighty-Four social classes were defined as the inner party, outer party, and the working class. It sounds really "holier than thou" when you say it, we're really not this full of ourselves, but we liked the idea of creating this full, multimedia, over-stimulating, elitist environment that we were trying to invite everyone into. It's the ironic elitist class.

== History ==
=== Early years and formation (2000–07) ===
Before singer Patrick Nissley and drummer Jared Piccone started Innerpartysystem, both of them were playing in Reading emo band Thirteen Over Eight. Piccone joined in 2000, a few years after their inception. Though the group enjoyed a fair local response, things did not take off until the two started the electronic-inspired The Takeover in 2006, which was later renamed Innerpartysystem. Nissley is the primary songwriter and programmer, along with Kris Barman who plays guitar and keyboards. Piccone plays drums and Jesse Cronan played keyboards and samples. The band signed to Stolen Transmission in May 2007. "Heart of Fire" was played during the 2007 MTV VMAs in September just before the band released The Download EP a couple of months later.

=== Innerpartysystem (2008–09) ===
The band released their first music in May 2008 for their lead album single "Don't Stop". The self-titled album was later released on the September 29, 2008. "Don't Stop" has been used in the EA Sports game Madden NFL 09, as well as being made into the first 7 inch "vinyl" made out of chocolate. "Heart of Fire" appeared on the soundtrack for Criterion Games' Burnout Paradise. The instrumental of the song "This Empty Love" from the band's album was later featured in the racing video game, Need for Speed: Undercover.

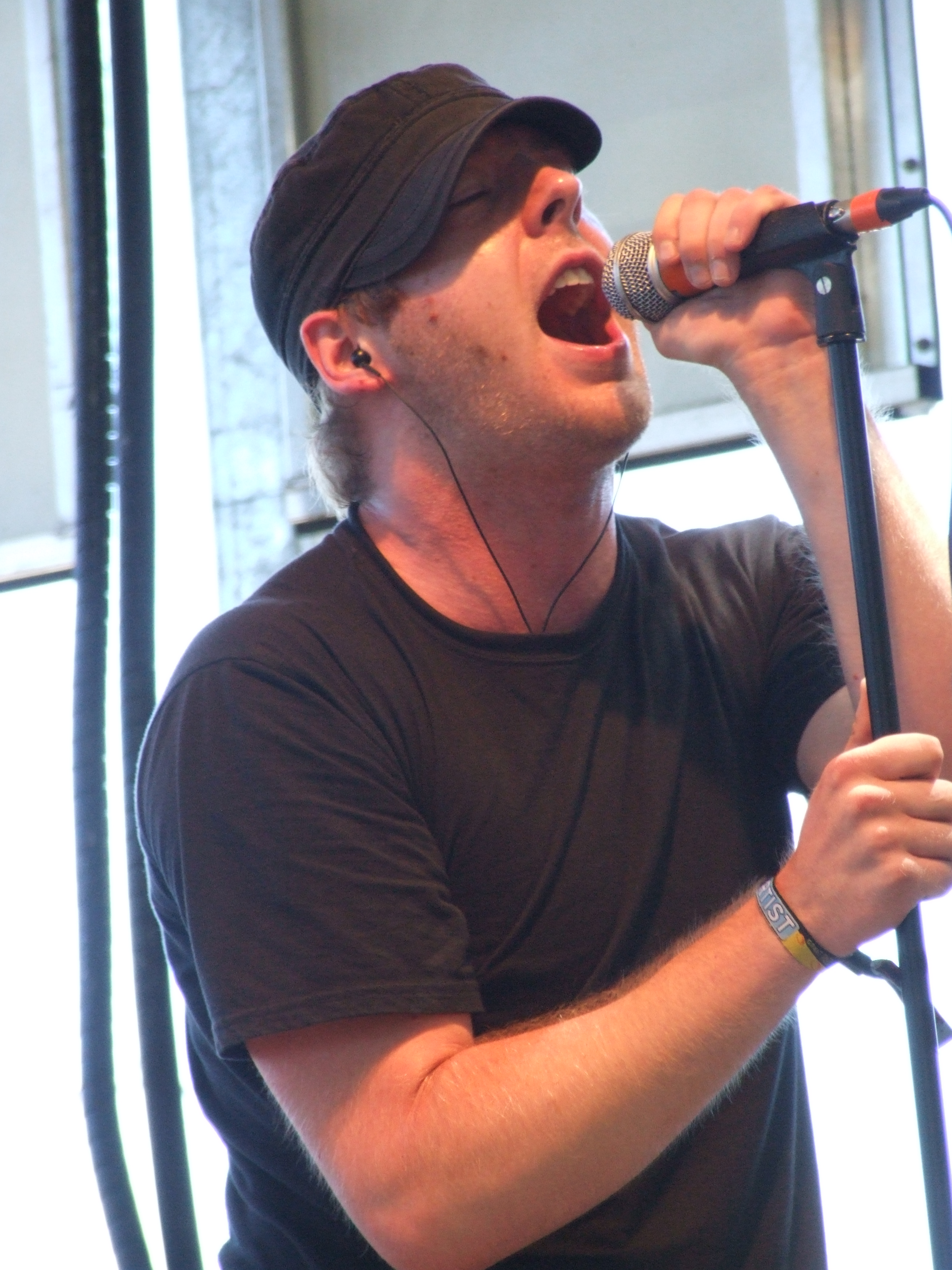
Nissley at Lollapalooza, 2008.

The band spent the summer touring in anticipation of their album release, playing numerous dates with Kill Hannah and Mindless Self Indulgence, as well as playing Chicago's Lollapalooza festival and a two-week UK tour which included two dates on Linkin Park's Projekt Revolution tour and the O2 Wireless Festival in London's Hyde Park.

"Die Tonight Live Forever", the band's second single and video, were released in September 2008.

The band's self-titled debut album was released on September 29, 2008 in the United Kingdom and September 30 in the United States. The band went on to tour in support of their newly released album with a short UK tour in October and subsequent US tour supporting 3OH!3. The band continued to tour the US and then headed back to the UK towards an almost sold-out UK tour in January 2009 before a short return in the US and then went to Australia for the first time to take part in the 2009 annual Soundwave festival.

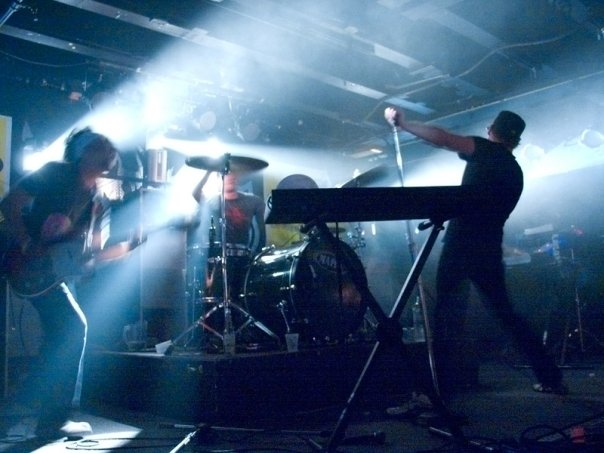
Innerpartysystem at TNT Bar, 2008.

The band have also experimented with live stripped down versions of their songs played using various downloadable music-related applications on the iPhone. They played Don't Stop live in this manner on a couple of radio stations before being asked to perform a free five-track set in an Apple Store in London. They later performed on the famous Warped Tour across in the summer of 2009 in North America.

On June 30, 2009, the band announced on their official Myspace and Facebook pages that they have parted ways with their label, Island Records. They wrote: "There are some really amazing, overworked, underpaid, stressed out people who love music, working very hard there… and there are a handful of people who just didn't really understand this band, and didn't know how to react when 'Don't Stop' wasn't 'Just Dance'. Our bad there." The same day, they announced the creation of their new forum site, where they put up a free download of their new summer mixtape, Summertime in Gameland, which features previously released remixes that the band has made. Also posted are stems of their songs that fans can download for free and remix.

On October 9, the band sent out their October Newsletter stating that September had been "much busier than expected". "Writing and demo-ing for the new record has been going full steam and it looks like we have 15 ideas that are over the bar set by the last record." The band also said that they would "probably head into the studio early next year."

=== Never Be Content and new record label (2010–July 11) ===
The band released an album teaser on February 16, teasing several new songs, of which fans on the band's message board reacted most highly to American Trash, which was consequently released as independently as a download-only single on May 18, with an early preview uploaded to the band's Myspace on April 16, 2010. On August 2 the band signed to Red Bull Records, stating they had been brainstorming ideas with the label and that the label have been "an overall positive influence on Innerpartysystem since the day they came into our lives".

Piccone tweeted that a new album should be released in 2011. Jared tweeted that a new 6-song EP would be released in January 2011 and that a UK tour was planned for the same year. The band are booked to play a one off London show in January 2011. This year will bring a two-part release for the band: a 6-song EP Never Be Content and a full-length album later this year. Never Be Content was hinted to be released in January 2011, but was given a digital release date of February 22 and a physical release date of March 29. The press release has stated that the EP's sound will see the band's previous punk-rock genre fade as the EP concentrates more on electronic dance music.

Innerpartysystem returned to the UK in March, April and May for various festivals, headline and support slots. The band went on to release another song from their Never Be Content EP in July 2011, entitled "Not Getting Any Better", the longest song they have created to date.

=== Indefinite hiatus (August 2011–present) ===
On August 3, 2011, Innerpartysystem announced via e-mail to fans that they have decided to go on an indefinite hiatus:

We find ourselves struggling to find the right way to start this statement to you all. Maybe a clever anecdote, or short story with some witty but true moral is in order? Nah, lets just stick to the facts. You all have been beyond amazing to us, and you deserve nothing less than the honest truth.

innerpartysystem is going on indefinite hiatus. We aren't breaking up nor do we hate each other. As a matter of fact, we are all great friends. BROTHERS. Our experiences with this band and the people we've met over the past 6 years have shaped us into who we are today. We will without a doubt look back on these times with nothing but positive thoughts and feelings.

They finished up their remaining shows after this message was sent. The three remaining members are all pursuing solo efforts and do not know if the band will get back together in the future.

Their song "And Together" is included in the soundtrack for the live action feature film Bad Kids Go to Hell (2012), based on the best selling graphic novel of the same name.

Nissley has been producing for the likes of Skrillex collaborator Penny, Barman has been producing under the alias Wuki, and Piccone had been producing under the aliases Spacebrother and Rebel before joining the electronic music duo Black Caviar in 2015.

== Band members ==
Although the band consists of three members, Andrew Nissley plays a significant part in sound mixing, lighting design, looping and backing vocals. Stephen Penta also plays an important part in the videography for the band as well as part of the management for the band.

- Patrick Nissley – vocals, programming (2006–2011)
- Jared Piccone – drums, backing vocals (2006–2011)
- Kris Barman – programming, guitar, synthesizer, backing vocals (2006–2011)

Former members

- Eric Firsching – guitar (2006)
- Jesse Cronan – synthesizer, sampling, lighting design, backing vocals (2006–2010)

== Discography ==
=== Studio releases ===
Title	Details	Peak chart positions	
Title	Details	US Heat	UK Rock
Innerpartysystem	Released: September 30, 2008; Label: Island; Formats: CD, digital download	4	10

=== Extended plays ===
Title	Details	Peak chart positions	
Title	Details	US Heat	US Dance
The Download EP	Released: November 12, 2007; Label: Stolen Transmission; Formats: CD, digital download	—	—
Never Be Content	Released: February 22, 2011; Label: Red Bull; Formats: CD, digital download	38	15

=== Mixtapes ===
Release date	Title	Label
June 29, 2009	Summertime in Gameland	Self-released
November 11, 2009	Innerpartysystem Winter Mixtape	Self-released
	Mini-mixtape vol. 1 (Spring 2010)	Self-released
	Mini-mixtape vol. 2 (Spring 2010)	Self-released

=== Singles ===
- "Don't Stop" (30 June 2008)
  - "Don't Stop" was released as a promotional single at some independent record stores.
- "Die Tonight Live Forever" (22 September 2008)
- "Don't Stop" (9 February 2009)
  - Re-released (for the second time) in the UK. New remix single was available.
- "Heart of Fire" (4 May 2009)
- "American Trash" (18 May 2010)
- "Not Getting Any Better" (4 July 2011)

=== Singles charts ===
Single	Year	Peak chart positions			Album
Single	Year	US Alt	US Dance	UK	Album
"Don't Stop"	2008	35	—	153	Innerpartysystem
"Die Tonight Live Forever"	2008	—	—	—	Innerpartysystem
"Heart of Fire"	2009	—	—	—	Innerpartysystem
"American Trash"	2010	—	—	—	Never Be Content
"Not Getting Any Better"	2011	—	35	—	Never Be Content
"—" denotes a recording that did not chart or was not released in that territory.

=== Remixes ===
Year	Remixed song	Original artist	Appears on	Remixed by
2008	"Hot n Cold"	Katy Perry	German and UK single	Patrick, Kris
2009	"Paris is Burning"	Ladyhawke	European single	Patrick, Kris
2009	"Kings and Queens"	Thirty Seconds to Mars	Digital download EP	Patrick, Kris
2009	"Circuits of Fever"	Thursday	Common Existence	Jesse
2009	"B-Boys in the Cut"	Beastie Boys		Jared
2009	"Don't Trust Me"	3OH!3	3OH!3 / Innerpartysystem Split 7	Patrick
2010	"My First Kiss"	3OH!3	My First Kiss Remix EP	??
2010	"Burn It Down"	Awolnation	Back From Earth	??
2010	"Fire In Your New Shoes"	Kaskade	Single	??
2010	"California Gurls"	Katy Perry	California Gurls: The Remixes	??
2010	"Like It's Her Birthday"	Good Charlotte	Like It's Her Birthday: The Remixes	??
2010	"OMFG"	Deluka		??
2010	"Hot Mess"	Cobra Starship	Take Action Volume 9	Patrick
2010	"Catch Myself Catching Myself"	Underoath	Ø	Patrick
2010	"Enemy Among Us" (Version 1)	Paper Route	Additions: The Remixes	Jared
2010	"New York City Speed"	Kill Hannah	Maxi single	Jared
2010	"Human Nature"	Brad Walsh	Unhitched, Restitched	Jared, Patrick
2010	"Human After All"	Twin Atlantic	Single	Patrick, Kris, Jared
2010	"Fame"	David Bowie		Patrick, Kris, Jared
??	"Talk Like That"	The Presets	??	??
??	"Human" (Version 1)	The Killers	??	Jesse
??	"Human" (Version 2)	The Killers	??	Kris
??	"Enemy Among Us" (Version 2)	Paper Route	??	Kris
??	"She Loves Me So" (Version 1)	Anthony Green	??	Kris
??	"She Loves Me So" (Version 2)	Anthony Green	??	Patrick
??	"Perfect Symmetry"	Keane	??	Patrick, Kris
??	"Chase Money"	Trouble Andrew		Patrick, Kris
2011	"Dance with the Devil"	The Sounds	??	??
2011	"Nude"	Radiohead	??	??
2011	"Green Queen"	Apoptygma Berzerk	Black EP Vol. 2	Jesse
2011	"The Blinding of False Light"	As I Lay Dying	Decas	??
2011	"Sail"	Awolnation	RE/Sail	??
2011	"Burn It Down"	Awolnation	RE/Sail	??
2011	"Lost in Space"	Starkey	Space Traitor Vol. 2	??
