= Die Tonight Live Forever =

Single by Innerpartysystem

from the album Innerpartysystem
- A-side: "Die Tonight Live Forever"
- Released: September 22, 2008
- Recorded: Los Angeles, California; Reading, Pennsylvania in 2008
- Genre: Electronic rock
- Length: 4:22
- Label: Island
- Songwriter(s): Innerpartysystem
- Producer(s): Mark Needham; Innerpartysystem

Innerpartysystem singles chronology
"Don't Stop" (2008)	"Die Tonight Live Forever" (2008)	"Heart of Fire" (2009)

Die Tonight Live Forever is the second single of the debut album by Innerpartysystem. The track has been featured on both Scuzz, Kerrang!, and is available for selection on Virgin Media On Demand. The single was only released United Kingdom (as was the previous single).

== Track listing ==
CD track list
No.	Title	Length
1.	"Die Tonight Live Forever"	4:44
2.	"Die Tonight Live Forever (Qemists remix)"	5:38
3.	"Die Tonight Live Forever (LA Riots remix)"	4:32

7 " Vinyl track list
No.	Title	Length
1.	"Die Tonight Live Forever" (A-side)	4:44
2.	"Reverof Evil Thginot Eid" (The A side, played backwards)	4:44

Digital download track list
No.	Title	Length
1.	"Die Tonight Live Forever (radio edit)"	3:36

Digital Download EP remix track list
No.	Title	Length
1.	"Die Tonight Live Forever (LA Riots remix)"	4:32
2.	"Die Tonight Live Forever (Qemists remix)"	5:38
3.	"Die Tonight Live Forever (ATN version)"	5:38
