= Gag =

Device or injunction to prevent speech

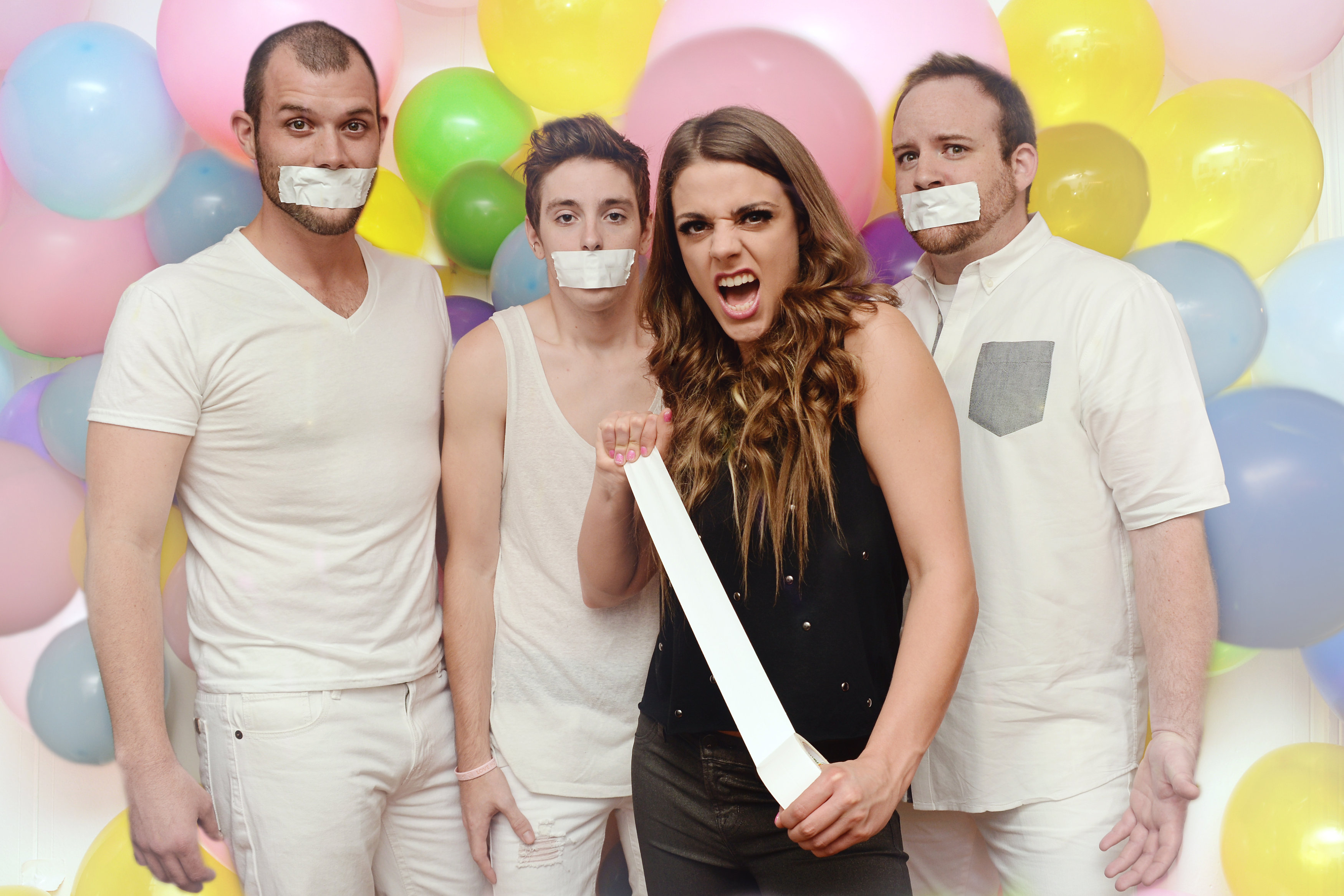
Men gagged with tape

A gag is usually an item or device designed to prevent speech, often as a restraint device to stop the subject from calling for help and keep its wearer silent. This is usually done by blocking the mouth, partially or completely, or attempting to prevent the tongue, lips, or jaw from moving in the normal patterns of speech.

The use of gags is commonly depicted in soap operas and crime fiction, particularly in comics, novels and films.

Courts have been known to gag certain people, such as the civil rights activist Bobby Seale. This practice has been criticized as inhumane.

== Types of gags ==
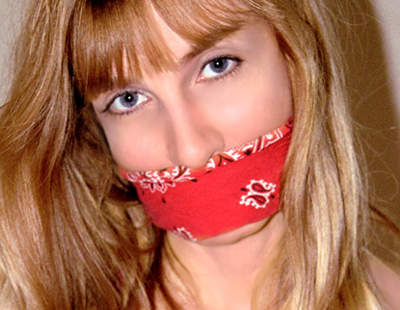
A woman with a stereotypical detective gag

One type of gag familiar in fiction, particularly in crime comics and novels, is a suitably sized piece of cloth pulled over the subject's mouth and tied at the back of their head. It is sometimes called the "detective gag" because many of its first appearances were in crime serials.

Sometimes a gag is pushed back between the victim's front teeth into the mouth, or with a hard ball in its middle or reinforced by pushing small cloth items into the mouth. This is common in BDSM, but in practice these sorts of gag can usually be dislodged by working the jaws about and/or pushing with the tongue, and they often do not stop the victim from making a loud inarticulate noise to call for help.

Often adhesive tapes are used for improvised gags. A tape gag can cause the skin on the lips to be damaged in its removal or the adhesive can cause chemical burns or reactions.

== Other uses of the word ==
The word "gag" has come to have various extended meanings, for example:

- Various sorts of laws and orders preventing or stopping discussion or revealing of information, e.g., a parliamentary procedure to end a debate. See gag order.
- A gag rule can be a part of court proceedings and congressional proceedings.
- Gag (medical device), to keep the mouth open
- A gag bit is a special bit type used with horses.

== In symbolism ==
- Sometimes in political cartoons, a character is shown gagged to represent that in the real world some law or rule or order is preventing him/her from speaking about some matter (see gag order).
- A gag that is specifically two stripes of red tape as an X is often used to represent censorship.

== See also ==
- Gag (BDSM), gags used for sexual purposes
- Mouth taping, sleeping with the lips taped shut
- Muzzle, devices to prevent animals from biting
- 🤬
