= Ocean's 8 (soundtrack) =

Ocean's 8 (Original Motion Picture Soundtrack)

Film score by Daniel Pemberton
- Released: June 1, 2018
- Recorded: 2017–2018
- Studios: Abbey Road (London, UK); Electric Lady (New York City); Power Station (New York City)
- Genre: Film score
- Length: 66:52
- Label: WaterTower Music
- Producer: Daniel Pemberton

Daniel Pemberton chronology
One Strange Rock (2018)	Ocean's 8 (2018)	Spider-Man: Into the Spider-Verse (2018)

Ocean's 8 (Original Motion Picture Soundtrack) is the film score soundtrack to the 2018 film Ocean's 8 directed by Gary Ross, which is a spin-off from Steven Soderbergh's Ocean's series, and the fourth installment overall. The film score is composed by Daniel Pemberton and was released through WaterTower Music on June 1, 2018.

== Development ==
Pemberton was offered to compose the score of Ocean's 8 after some of the crew members in Warner Bros. had liked his work for The Man from U.N.C.L.E. (2015) in belief that the sound and vibe would fit the film. Having liked the music—soundtracks and scores—of the original trilogy, he felt that "music was a very big part of the feel"; he was interested in doing films where "music can be the feature rather than the supporting artist" and offering the chance to do bold, upfront music which Ocean's 8 gave that chance. He was also influenced by Serge Gainsbourg and music from the British Library, similar to David Holmes' influences on his score for the original trilogy but wanted to capture "the groove and swagger of those films" while making it a bit quirkier than the original film scores.

Inspired the classic scores during the 1950s and 1960s which were "rhythmic, groove-based scores", Pemberton wanted the score to be felt like it was played by musicians rather than cues being written on computer. He referenced scores from that era being inventive in terms of instrumentation and had tried to emulate the formula in the current Hollywood era. He discussed with Ross about his likes and dislikes and worked closely with him. Since the film was set in the New York City, the score was also recorded and mixed there at the Power Station and Electric Lady Studios, while part of the mixing as well as editing and mastering were held at the Abbey Road Studios in London.

Pemberton assembled a group of jazz musicians from New York and worked on the score, while also playing keyboards, he learned "the power of giving artists and musicians space, to rewrite what works best with cues on the fly" while also describing it as an exciting and fun project owing to their energy and rapport with the musicians. Several jazz-based instruments like the surf guitar, Latin percussion, saxophones from New Orleans and big 50 cords, assembling from multiple genres.

Besides the score, the film also incorporated various songs which Pemberton attributed to the likeness of the eclecticism of the trilogy's soundtracks. Gabe Hilfer and Devoe Yates served as the music supervisors. The song "Gold on the Ceiling" by the Black Keys was instrumentalized by Pemberton and used in the final scene as it "got a great attitude to it, so it worked with the culmination of [the characters'] lives and going on their next journey".

== Track listing ==
No.	Title	Length
1.	"5 Years, 8 Months and 12 Days"	0:38
2.	"NYC Larceny"	3:47
3.	"We are Going to Rob It"	2:38
4.	"Taking out the Trash"	1:48
5.	"Nine-Ball"	3:40
6.	"Deborah Ocean"	2:53
7.	"Okell Bongos '63"	2:15
8.	"Seven Van Plan"	2:56
9.	"Hacking the Met"	2:34
10.	"Fugue in D Minor"	2:43
11.	"Brooklyn Necklace"	2:53
12.	"The Gala Plan"	1:58
13.	"Diamonds and Magnets"	1:49
14.	"The Investigator"	3:05
15.	"The Spy"	3:52
16.	"In Vogue"	2:11
17.	"CCTV Blindspot"	1:30
18.	"Sealing the Exits"	2:39
19.	"Four Old Ladies"	2:39
20.	"Sloppy Soup Samba"	2:52
21.	"Game On!"	4:28
22.	"Fugue in D Minor (Reprise)"	1:29
23.	"The Actual Heist"	4:43
24.	"Moog Necklace"	4:52
Total length:		66:52

== Reception ==
Leo Mayr of Film.Music.Media wrote "Pemberton was a perfect fit for Ocean's 8, delivering a fun and unique heist score that rarely ever repeats itself. Each scene feels unique, and Pemberton never really drops the pace throughout the movie. There's a lot to be enjoyed here, and the 66 minute album is well worth revisiting time and time again." Jim Paterson of Mfiles wrote "In summary the film score makes a great album of what might be termed chillout music with energy, and it has an infectious humour which makes repeated listening worthwhile."

David Rooney of The Hollywood Reporter wrote "Ocean's 8 tries to inject that verve with an eclectic mix of music to supplement Daniel Pemberton's score, from Charles Aznavour to Amy Winehouse, James Last to The Notorious B.I.G." Ian Freer of Empire called it a "groovy score". Molly Freeman of Screen Rant wrote "the music composed by Daniel Pemberton seems to honor the mood of Ocean's 11, helping Ocean's 8 to fit into the tone of the series." Alonso Duralde of TheWrap admitted that the film's score provided the danger and excitement which the film did not deliver. Adam Graham of The Detroit News wrote "Daniel Pemberton's loungy electronic score keeps things light and breezy. " Tim Robey of The Daily Telegraph wrote "there's brassy music, by a never-better Daniel Pemberton, which beefs up the David Holmes grooves from the first trilogy, putting a lot of wind in the film's sails." Chris Bumbray of JoBlo.com called it "terrific".

== Additional music ==
The following songs are featured in the film, but not included in the soundtrack:

- "Best Friend" – Sofi Tukker featuring Nervo, Alisa Ueno and the Knocks
- "You and Only You" – Eamonn Doyle
- "Hypnotize" – The Notorious B.I.G.
- "Love Is All Around" – Sammy Davis Jr.
- "Action Line" – Dorothy Ashby
- "Bossy" – Kelis featuring Too Short
- "Hot Sand" – Anubian Lights
- "(How Much Is That) Doggie in the Window?" – Patti Page
- "Petite Fleur" – Chris Barber and His Jazz Band and Monty Sunshine
- "Fugue In D Minor" – Johann Sebastian Bach
- "Parce que tu crois" – Charles Aznavour
- "Masks Rappelling Down" – The Perfect Score
- "Lara's Theme" – James Last and his Orchestra
- "E.V.A." – Andy Badale, Marie Perreault and Jean-Jacques Perrey
- "These Boots Are Made for Walkin'" – Nancy Sinatra
- "These Boots Are Made for Walkin'" – Nick West featuring Merenia
- "Superfly" – Curtis Mayfield
- "Me & Mr Jones" – Amy Winehouse
- "Gold on the Ceiling" – The Black Keys
- "Cold Comfort Lane" – Holy Moly & The Crackers

== Credits ==
Credits adapted from WaterTower Music:

- Music composer and producer – Daniel Pemberton
- Sound engineer – Matt Mysko, Paul Pritchard, Zach Brown
- Recording and mixing – Sam OKell
- Mastering – Alex Wharton
- Music editor– John Finklea, Katrina Schiller, Ken Karman, Nevin Seus, Todd Kasow
- Score editor – John Finklea, Katrina Schiller, Ken Karman, Nevin Seus, Todd Kasow
- Pro-tools operator – Fernando Loderio, Gloria Kaba
- Music supervisor – Devoe Yates, Gabe Hilfer
- Music preparation – Andrew Soto, Chris Duschene, Tony Finno
- Art direction – Sandeep Sriram

Orchestra

- Orchestration – Andrew Skeet
- Contractor – Sandra Park
- Cello – Jerry Grossman, Joel Noyes, Sophie Shao
- Harp – Tori Drake
- Percussion – Cyro Baptista, Erik Charlston, Jamey Haddad, Wilson Torres
- Tenor saxophone – Andy Snitzer, Charlie Pillow
- Trombone – Chris Olness, Jeff Nelson, Joe Fiedler, Ryan Keberle
- Trumpet – Jon Owens, Tony Kadleck
- Viola – Maurycy Banaszek, Michael Roth, Shmuel Katz
- Violin – David Southorn, Emily Popham, Joyce Hammann, Katherine Fong, Lisa Kim, Minyoung Baik, Peter Bahng, Sharon Yamada, Suzanne Ornstein, Yurika Mok

Soloists

- Alto saxophone and flute – Aaron Heick
- Baritone saxophone – Dave Riekenberg
- Bass – James Genus, Shahzad Ismaily, Tim Lefebvre
- Drums – Kenny Wollesen
- Guitar – Leo Abrahams, Marc Copeley, Matt Beck
- Keyboards – Daniel Pemberton, Henry Hey, Robert Burger, Rob Schwimmer
- Percussion, bongos – Sam OKell, Wilson Torres
- Timpani, bells – Erik Charlston
