= Mouth prop =

A mouth prop (also bite block) is a wedge-shaped implement used in dentistry for dentists working with children and other patients who have difficulty keeping their mouths open wide and steady during a procedure, or during procedures where the patient is sedated. It has a rubber-like texture and is typically made from thermoplastic vulcanizate (TPV) material. They come in several different sizes, from pediatric to adult, and are typically ridged as to use the back teeth to hold them in place.

== See also ==
- Dental gag
