= Wuki =

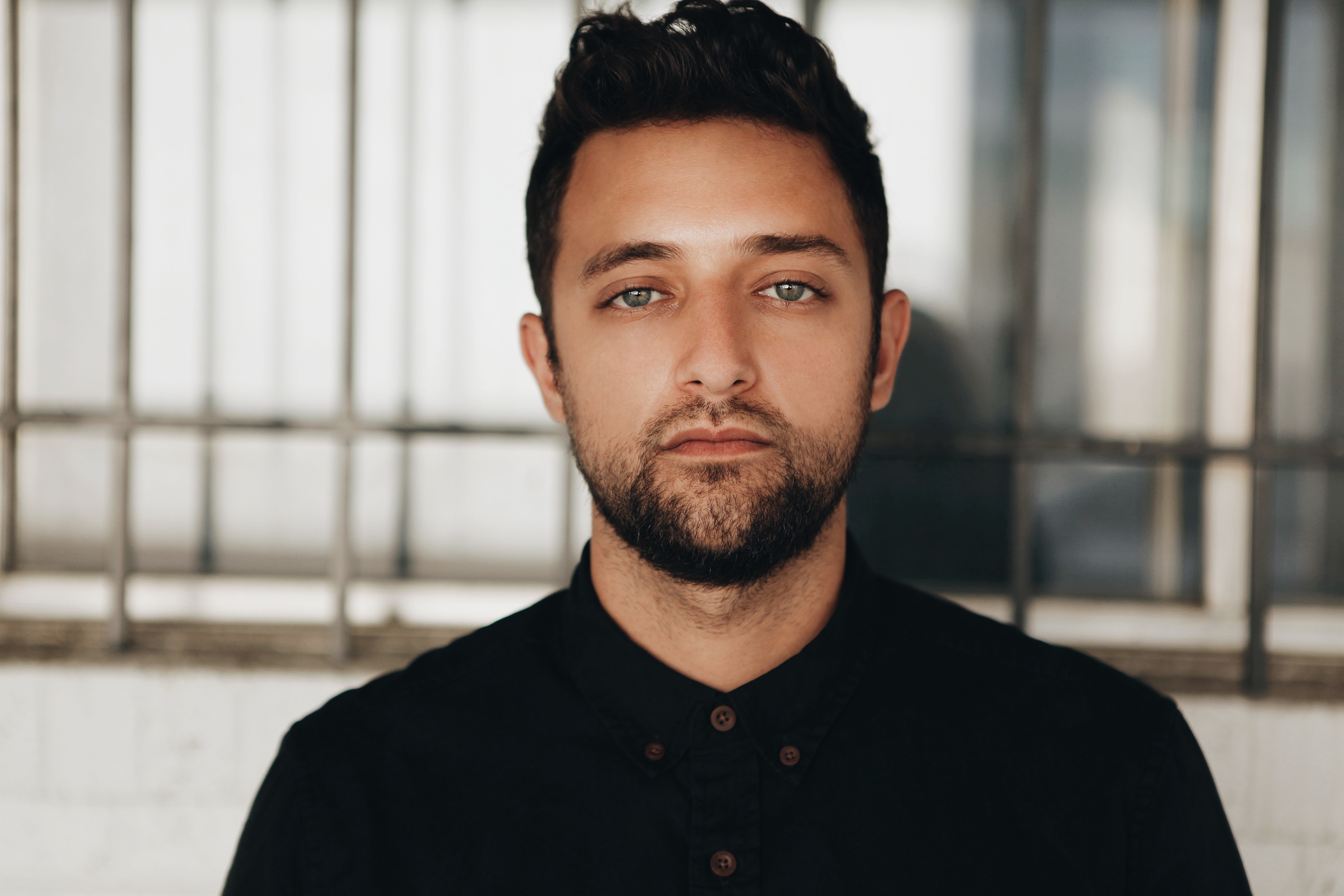
- Wuki in 2014

Background information
- Born: Kris Barman; 20 December 1984 (age 41); New Jersey, United States
- Genres: Dubstep; trap; EDM
- Occupations: DJ; record producer
- Instruments: DAW; synthesizer; guitar
- Years active: 2007–present
- Labels: Owsla; Mad Decent; WUKILEAKS; HARD RECS
- Publisher: Monstercat
- Formerly of: Innerpartysystem

Kris Barman (born December 20, 1984), known professionally as Wuki, is an American musician, DJ, and record producer. He was a member of the electronic rock band Innerpartysystem from 2007 to 2011 where he sang back up vocals, played the guitar and synthesizer, and helped with programming. He was nominated for a 2020 Grammy Award for Best Remixed Recording for Miley Cyrus's "Mother's Daughter". His debut album, WukiWorld, was released in 2021.

== Early life ==
In a 2018 article with marijuana.com, Barman recalls how he got his start in music. "I started playing instruments when I was like 13 — I started playing guitar. Started making beats when I was 16 on Fruity Loops. Between 19 and 20, a buddy of mine that was always a huge fan of our local scene started a band, an electro-rock band. I dropped out of school to go do that. I dropped out of college to go pursue this band."

In an interview with Nest HQ, a self-described "culture-garnering media platform" conceived by the dance music superstar Skrillex, Barman reflects on his earliest influences the initial spark of interest in electronic dance music. "I played guitar growing up so I definitely listened to a lot of punk / alt music. But when I heard The Prodigy's “Smack My Bitch Up" things changed."

== Career ==
On August 3, 2011, after touring extensively for many years as guitarist and synth player in electronic rock band Innerpartysystem, the band announced that they were to be going on an indefinite hiatus; the band has not performed since. Barman moved to Denver, Colorado, and began producing and performing under the moniker Wuki. One of his first gigs as Wuki was hosting the late night radio show E-Lven on Denver's 93.3 FM.

Wuki has since gone on to grow his solo project, racking up over 121 million streams across all platforms through 2023.

Delivering his first-ever self release as Wuki in 2012 with a four-track EP called Something For Everyone Vol. 1, he released the singles "Diwali", "Buffalo Bass", "Jungle Funk" and "That’s Right". In 2015, Wuki gained recognition for his remix of RL Grime and Big Sean's 2015 hit "Kingpin". After releasing music on imprints such as Owsla, Main Course, Mad Decent, Fool's Gold, and Ultra, in 2018n Wuki set up his own record label, Wukileaks.

Wuki's hit remixes and bootleg edits caught the eyes of artists including Skrillex, Miley Cyrus, Selena Gomez, The Chainsmokers, Anna Lunoe, Zeds Dead, and Diplo, with the latter offering Wuki his own monthly radio show, Wukileaks Wednesdays, on Diplo's Revolution.

Wuki was nominated for Best Remixed Recording at the 62nd Annual Grammy Awards for his remix of Miley Cyrus's "Mother's Daughter". His 2019 single "Better" with Valentino Khan and Roxanne was a top trend on TikTok in 2020. His single "Throw It" was featured in the 2020 Netflix film Work It, starring Sabrina Carpenter.

On January 24, 2020, he and Nitti Gritti released the EP Ro Sham Bo. He started off the year with a 16-date North American tour, also called ‘Ro Sham Bo’.

On March 12, 2021, he released his debut album, WukiWorld, on HARD Recs. It features appearances from Diplo, Shaquille O'Neal, Juvenile, Yung Baby Tate, and Smokepurpp.

In 2023, Wuki teamed up with Lee Foss to remix Cheryl Lynn's 1978 disco single "Got to Be Real". This followed his 2022 remix of Stevie Nicks' 1981 single "Edge of Seventeen", which reached number 1 on the UK Shazam Dance Charts. His 2023 single "Sunshine (My Girl)" incorporates elements of "My Girl" by The Temptations. This was followed by his 2023 Sunshine Tour across North America. He also performed that year at Red Rocks, Sunset, Shambhala, and HARD Summer.

On Januaray 8, 2026 Wuki released "Rainbow" under Monstercat Instinct. The song was featured on Rocket League x Monstercat. This was his debut Monstercat release.

== Awards ==
Year	Award	Category	Work	Result
2020	Grammy Award	Best Remixed Recording	"Mother's Daughter" by Miley Cyrus	Nominated

== Discography ==
=== Albums ===
List of full-length albums, with selected details
Title	Album details
WukiWorld	Released: March 12, 2021; Label: HARD Recs; Formats: Digital download

=== EPs ===
List of extended plays, with selected details
Title	Album details
Something for Everyone Vol. 1	Released: September 6, 2012; Label: Self-released; Formats: Digital download
Hot/Talk	Released: September 16, 2014; Label: Main Course; Formats: Digital download
Wukipedia Vol. 1	Released: April 27, 2018; Label: Wukileaks; Formats: Digital download
2	Released: April 26, 2019; Label: Confession; Formats: Digital download
Ro Sham Bo	Released: January 24, 2020; Label: Insomniac Records; Formats: Digital download

=== Singles ===
- "Diwali" (2013)
- "Buffalo Bass" (2013)
- "Jungle Funk" (2013)
- "Git Loose" (feat. Curtis B) (2014)
- "That's Right" (feat. Jesse Slayter) (2014)
- "Lip Pop" (2015)
- "Front2Back" (feat. DJ Funk) (2015)
- "Make It Clap" (feat. Dances with White Girls) (2016)
- "Let Me Go" (feat. PRXZM) (2017)
- "Bullseye" (feat. Valentino Khan) (2017)
- "Popcorn Man" (2017)
- "Catch Ya Breath" (2017)
- "Go Deep" (feat. Nicky da B) (2018)
- "Bed Squeak" (feat. Ape Drums and Nicky da B) (2019)
- "IGD" (2019)
- "What You Need" (feat. Anna Lunoe) (2019)
- "NYC 2 LA" (feat. Roxanna) (2019)
- "Old School Sound" (feat. Cesqeaux) (2019)
- "Better" (feat. Valentino Khan and Roxanna) (2019)
- "Throw It" (feat. YehMe2) (2019)
- "Chicken Wang" (feat. Diplo and Snappy Jit) (2020)
- "Bad Girl Drumma" (feat. Juvenile) (2020)
- "I See You" (feat. Stoppa) (2020)
- "Hey Ladies" (feat. Baby Tate and Stoppa) (2020)
- "SHUTUP" (feat. Scrilla King and Shaquille O'Neal) (2020)
- "Birdz" (with Smokepurpp) (2021)
- "Family" (feat. Softest Hard) (2021)
- "We Like to Wuki" (feat. Vengaboys and Yo Majesty) (2022)
- "Sunshine (My Girl)" (2023)
- "Shake It" (feat. Trace) (2024)
- "Rainbow" (2016)

=== Remixes ===
- RL Grime feat. Big Sean – "Kingpin" (2015)
- Lip Pop – "Eyes Everywhere" (2015)
- The Chainsmokers feat. Halsey – "Closer" (2016)
- Lost Kings feat. Tinashe – "Quit You" (2017)
- Black Caviar – "Coco" (2018)
- Miley Cyrus – "Mother's Daughter" (2019)
- Slayyyter – "Daddy AF" (2020)
- NCT U – "Make a Wish (Birthday Song)" (2020)
- Andy Mineo with Lecrae – "Coming In Hot" (2021)
- Sarah Cothran – "As the World Caves In" (2021)
- Stevie Nicks – "Edge of Seventeen" (2022)
- Cheryl Lynn – "To Be Real" (2023)
