= Black Caviar (duo) =

American DJ duo

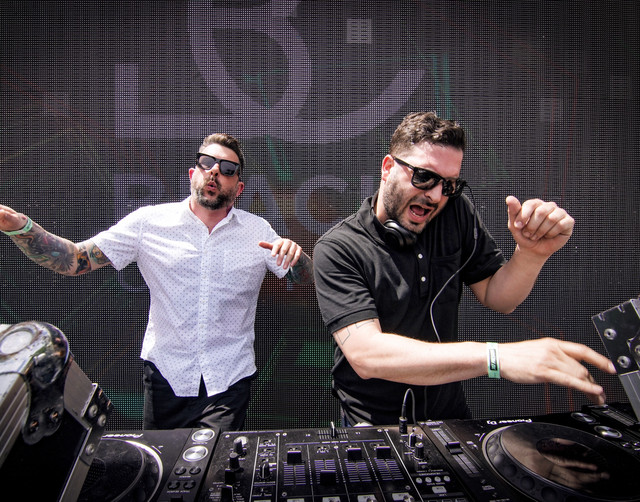

Background information
- Origin: New York City, US
- Genres: EDM; Bass house; G-House; Hip hop
- Years active: 2015-present
- Labels: Insomniac/In Rotation; Universal Records; Casablanca Records
- Members: Jared Piccone, Troy Hinson
- Website: www.realblackcaviar.com

Black Caviar is an American DJ duo from New York City, consisting of Troy Hinson and Jared Piccone. Black Caviar produced "What’s Up Danger", which was featured on the Spider-Man: Into the Spider-Verse soundtrack.

== History ==
=== 2015–2017 ===
In 2015, Hinson and Piccone started producing music under the name Black Caviar. Before founding Black Caviar, Piccone and Hinson had started their careers playing in Pennsylvania rock bands, which is how they met. Hinson is known for his work on Sirius XM's Jim Norton & Sam Roberts Show. Piccone was the cofounder and drummer of Innerpartysystem, and later worked as an A&R representative at Casablanca Records.

In 2015, Black Caviar gained popularity with their cover of "Lady (Hear Me Tonight)" by Modjo.

=== 2017–2019 ===
Black Caviar signed to Casablanca Records in 2017, and released their debut single "Coco" in November. The single peaked at 22 on Billboard's Dance/Mix Show Airplay charts in February 2018. In 2018, a remix of "Coco" by Piccone's former Innerpartysystem bandmate Kris Barman (better known as Wuki) was released.

Black Caviar's "What's Up Danger" was released on November 1, 2018, as the second single from the Spider-Man: Into the Spider-Verse soundtrack. The single was a collaboration with rapper Blackway. The soundtrack reached number one on Billboard's Top Soundtracks and number 2 on Billboard 200. Black Caviar released an official dance remix of "What's Up Danger" in February, 2019.

Black Caviar produced several singles in the summer of 2019, including "El Camino", "Alright Alright Okay", "Zonin", and "Do You Like It When I'm Freaky". Black Caviar collaborated with the DJ trio Jaded and London-based duo Antony and Cleopatra for the single "Slippin". The duo hinted at new releases and movie work in a 2019 interview. Black Caviar released an EP titled "Boing/Keep My High" on October 22, 2019. Black Caviar remixed the "Charlie's Angel Theme" for the 2019 Charlie's Angels soundtrack.

The duo released their second EP, Moon Landing, on November 22, 2019. On December 6, 2020 the duo released the official cover of Justin Caruso's "Broken Hearts".

=== 2020–present ===
In January 2020, Black Caviar self-released their EP Caviar Chronicles Vol. 1. In June 2020 they released "Stacks On My Feet" on Tchami's record label Confession. Black Caviar collaborated with Norwegian DJ duo KREAM on the single "Jack".

Black Caviar collaborated with Blackway once again on the single "Do The Damn Thing", released November 22, 2020. Black Caviar released three more singles, "Hometown", "Money Money" and "Own My Own Masters" in 2021.

== Influences ==
Black Caviar's music has been described as producing hip hop influenced dance music, which includes elements of the EDM, house, R&B and Latin genres. In an interview with EDM Identity, Black Caviar listed The Chemical Brothers, Timbaland, Fatboy Slim, and Daft Punk as influences

== Discography ==
| Title | Details |
|---|---|
| Caviar Chronicles Vol. 1 | Released: January 24, 2020; Label: self-released |
| Moon Landing | Released: November 22, 2019; Label: Thrive Music |
| Boing/Keep My High | Released: October 22, 2019; Label: Insomniac/In Rotation |

=== Singles ===
| Year | Title | Certifications | Album | Record label |
|---|---|---|---|---|
| 2021 | "Own My Own Masters" | — | | Create Music Group |
| 2021 | "Money Money" with Rion S | — | | D4 D4NCE |
| 2021 | "Hometown" with Imanos | — | | Deux Trois |
| 2020 | "Do The Damn Thing" ft. Blackway | — | | Big Beat Records |
| 2020 | "Praise" | — | | Thrive Music |
| 2020 | "Stacks on My Feet" | — | | Confession |
| 2020 | "Rollergirl" | — | | |
| 2020 | "Bang Bang" with Jenn Morel | — | | Aftercluv Dance Lab |
| 2020 | "Jack" with KREAM | — | | |
| 2019 | "Charlie’s Angels Theme" (Black Caviar Remix) by Jack Elliott, Allyn Ferguson | — | Charlie's Angels: Original Motion Picture Soundtrack | Republic Records |
| 2019 | "Keep My High" | — | Boing/Keep My High | Insomniac/In Rotation |
| 2019 | "Boing" | — | Boing/Keep My High | Insomniac/In Rotation |
| 2019 | "Do You Like It When I'm Freaky?" | — | | Heldeep Records |
| 2019 | "Zonin'" (ft. G.L.A.M.) | — | | Dim Mak Records |
| 2019 | "Alright Alright Okay"(ft. G.L.A.M.) | — | | Dim Mak Records |
| 2019 | "El Camino" | — | | Casablanca Records |
| 2019 | "Slippin'" with Jaded & Antony and Cleopatra | — | | Hexagon |
| 2018 | "What's Up Danger" with Blackway | RIAA: Gold; BPI: Silver | Spider-Man: Into the Spider-Verse | Republic Records |
| 2018 | "Coco (ft. u.n.i.)(Wuki Remix) | — | | Casablanca Records |
| 2018 | "Freak Like Me" | — | | Casablanca Records |
| 2018 | "Funk In The Trunk" | — | | — |
| 2018 | "Killa Shit Funk" (ft. G.L.A.M.) | — | | Casablanca Records |
| 2017 | "Disco Drum" (Aylen remix) | — | | — |
| 2017 | "Do It... The Way I Do It" | — | | — |
| 2017 | "Coco" (ft. u.n.i.) | — | | Casablanca Records |
| 2016 | "Good Lovin'" | — | | — |
| 2016 | "You Ain't Gotta Bounce To This" | — | | — |
| 2016 | "Disco Drum" | — | | — |
| 2016 | "Natural One" | — | | — |
| 2016 | "Te Su Animale"(ft. Justina Valentine) | — | | — |
| 2016 | "New York, What's Happenin'" (ft. Kool Keith) | — | | — |
| 2015 | "Lady (Hear Me Tonight)" (Modjo cover) | | | — |
| 2015 | "Touch It" | — | | — |

=== Remixes ===
List of official remixes, showing original artists and record label

| Year | Title | Original Artist(s) | Record label |
|---|---|---|---|
| 2020 | "I Say No" | Sidekick | Nine Twenty Two |
| 2020 | "We Are Right Now" | CB30 | Walt Disney Records |
| 2020 | "Lights Go Out" | Riotron | |
| 2020 | "Deep In My Heart" | dEVOLVE x Breikthru ft. Saint Wade | 3Beat |
| 2020 | "Lights Up" | DVRKO | L3V3L/Creative Music Group |
| 2020 | "Back to Me" | Lindsay Lohan | Casablanca Records |
| 2020 | "Pump It Up!" | Danzel (Endor Remix) | Armada Music |
| 2020 | "Lonely" | Jay Sean | The Heavy Group |
| 2019 | "Broken Hearts" | Justin Caruso | Warner Chappell Music |
| 2019 | "Boys" | Lizzo | Atlantic Records |
| 2019 | "What's Up Danger" | Blackway & Black Caviar | Republic Records |
| 2019 | "One Drink" (Black Caviar Remix) | Picture This | Republic Records |
| 2019 | "Loving You Always" (Black Caviar Remix) | D-Wayne ft. Jack McManus | Be Yourself |
| 2019 | "Paradise" | Bazzi | Atlantic Records |
| 2019 | "Mood" (Black Caviar Remix) | Zack Martino | Armada Music |
| 2018 | "How You've Been" (Black Caviar Remix) | R3HAB | R3HAB Music |
| 2018 | "Make Up" | Vice & Jason Derulo (feat. Ava Max) | R3HAB Music |
| 2018 | "Bon Appetit" (Black Caviar Remix) | Shaun Frank & YA-LE! | Ultra Records |
| 2018 | "Boom" (Black Caviar Remix) | Tiësto, Sevenn, & Gucci Mane | Musical Freedom |
| 2018 | "Trouble" (Black Caviar Remix) | Nytrix & Luciana | Hussle Recordings |
| 2018 | "Mercy Me" (Black Caviar Remix) | Zander Bleck | Zander Bleck Records |
| 2017 | "Icarus" (Black Caviar Remix) | R3HAB | R3HAB Music |
| 2017 | "Down" (Black Caviar Remix) | Marian Hill | Republic Records |
| 2017 | "Rewind" (Black Caviar Remix) | Wingtip | Republic Records |
| 2017 | "Man's Not Hot" (Black Caviar Remix) | Big Shaq | Island Records |
| 2016 | "That Love" (Black Caviar Remix) | Shaggy | Sony Music Entertainment |
