= Gag (medicine) =

Medical device used to hold the mouth open

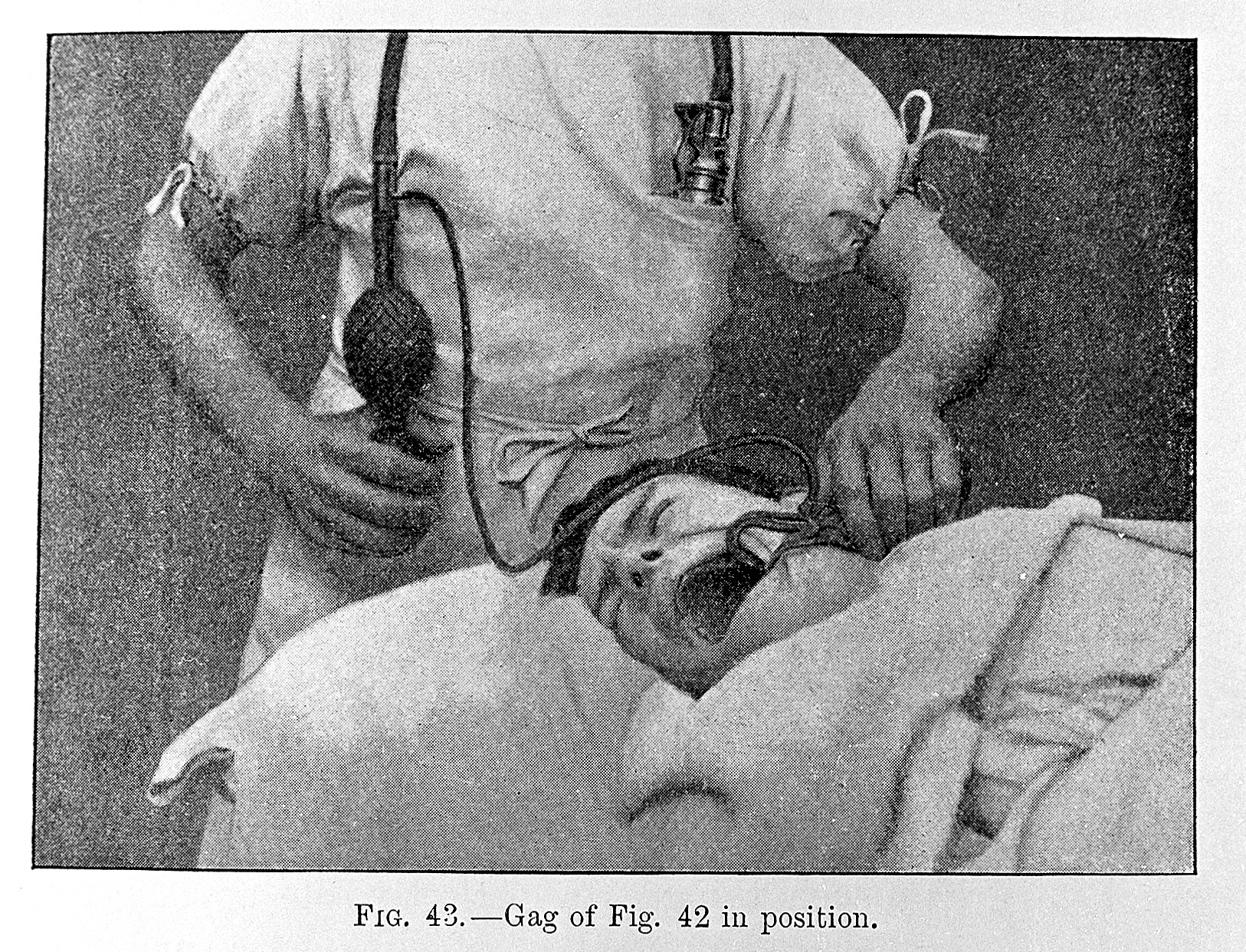
An old picture of a gag

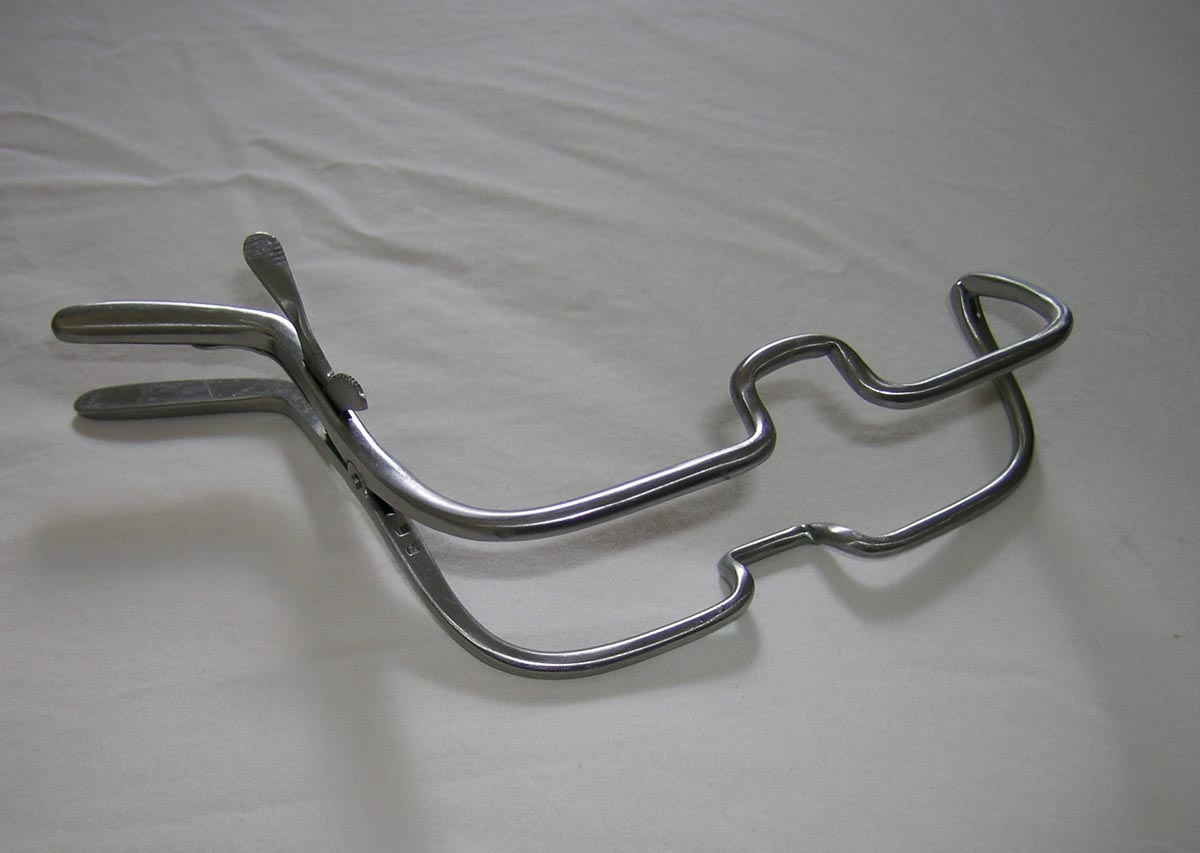
Jennings gag

In the context of surgery or dental surgery, a gag is a device used to hold the patient's mouth open when working in the oral cavity, or to force the mouth open when it cannot open naturally because of forward dislocation of the jaw joint's intraarticular cartilage pad. Applications for medical gags include oral surgery and airway management. Gag designs, like other medical instrument designs, are often named after their inventors. Common examples of medical gags include the Jennings, Whitehead, and Hallam gags.

== Types ==
- Whitehead gag: invented in 1877 by Walter Whitehead (1840-1913), a surgeon in Manchester, England, consists of two hinged metal frames that wrap around the front of the patient's head and which have sections bent to fit between the front teeth. When spread apart, the frames separate the jaws, holding the mouth open. The desired degree of separation is set and maintained by a ratchet mechanism on each side of the frame.
- Jennings gag: they are very similar, but there is a ratchet on only one side.

== Non-medical uses ==
These types of gags are also used in sexual fetish or bondage play. See Gag (BDSM) § Medical.

== See also ==
- Medical device
- Mouth prop
- Instruments used in general surgery
