= Gag (BDSM) =

Device used in sexual situations

A gag—an object placed in or over a person's mouth so as to prevent speech—may be used in sexual bondage and BDSM roleplay. Gags are usually associated with roleplays involving bondage, but that is not necessarily the case. The person who wears the gag is regarded as the submissive partner, while the other is regarded as the dominant one. People may wear gags for a variety of reasons. Some people derive erotic pleasure from a gag, either in a submissive or dominant role. When combined with other physical restraints, the wearing of a gag can increase the wearer's sense of helplessness and anxiety level within a BDSM scene by rendering them unable to speak during sexual activity, which some people enjoy.

For some people, gags have connotations of punishment and control, and thus can be used as a form of humiliation. To some, wearing a gag without restraints is still an act of humiliation, as is an open mouth gag. Some fetishists are sexually aroused by the sound gagged people make when they try to speak, or by seeing a person drool uncontrollably.

The type of gag used depends on the tastes of the parties and the type of roleplay scene, what is available at the time, and safety considerations. Some gags are designed to fill the mouth, while others are designed to provide access to the mouth by forcing the mouth open. Gags may be classified as over-the-mouth type, mouth stuffing type or mouth opening type.

When a person is sexually aroused by gags, it may be considered a paraphilia. One specific gag paraphilia relates to video depictions in which the captor gags the damsel in distress to stop her screaming for help. Some people are sexually aroused by such imagery, even if there is no nudity or sexual act present, or even if the victim is only gagged but not restrained in any way.

== Safety ==
Gagging anybody is very risky, as it involves a substantial risk of asphyxia if the subject's nose is blocked while wearing a gag. Using a gag on somebody who is ill or has a common allergy (including sensitivities to cologne or perfume) is also quite dangerous, as most gags make it difficult or impossible to breathe through the mouth. Vomiting and choking also pose a risk, since they further block the airway. A gagged subject should never be left alone.

In practice, no gag is effective enough to silence someone completely without inhibiting breathing. Most gags that prevent the subject from making intelligible speech still permit loud, inarticulate noises to call for help. Thus, a pattern of noises, such as three grunts in rapid succession, is sometimes used as a safeword by BDSM players. It is also common to use an additional non-verbal safety mechanism, such as a solid object held in the hand that can be released by the gagged person to signal distress.

== Types of gag ==
=== Ball ===
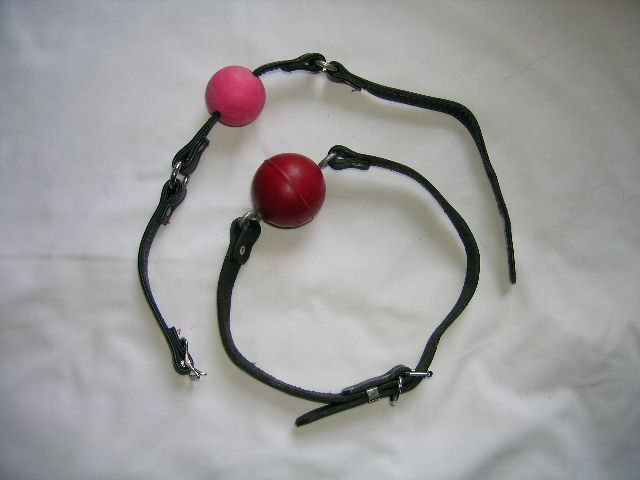
An example of different size ball gags

A ball gag is usually a rubber or silicone sphere with a strap passing through its diameter. The most common diameter is 1.75 inches (44 mm), but other sizes can be found.

A person with a ballgag on them

The ball is strapped into the mouth behind the teeth, with the straps going around the head to secure it in place. They are used as a sign of control by the dominant. If the ball is very large, it may be difficult to insert behind the teeth or to remove it. The wearer can still be heard, but it renders their speech completely unintelligible, distorts their facial features, and causes drooling if the wearer attempts to talk.

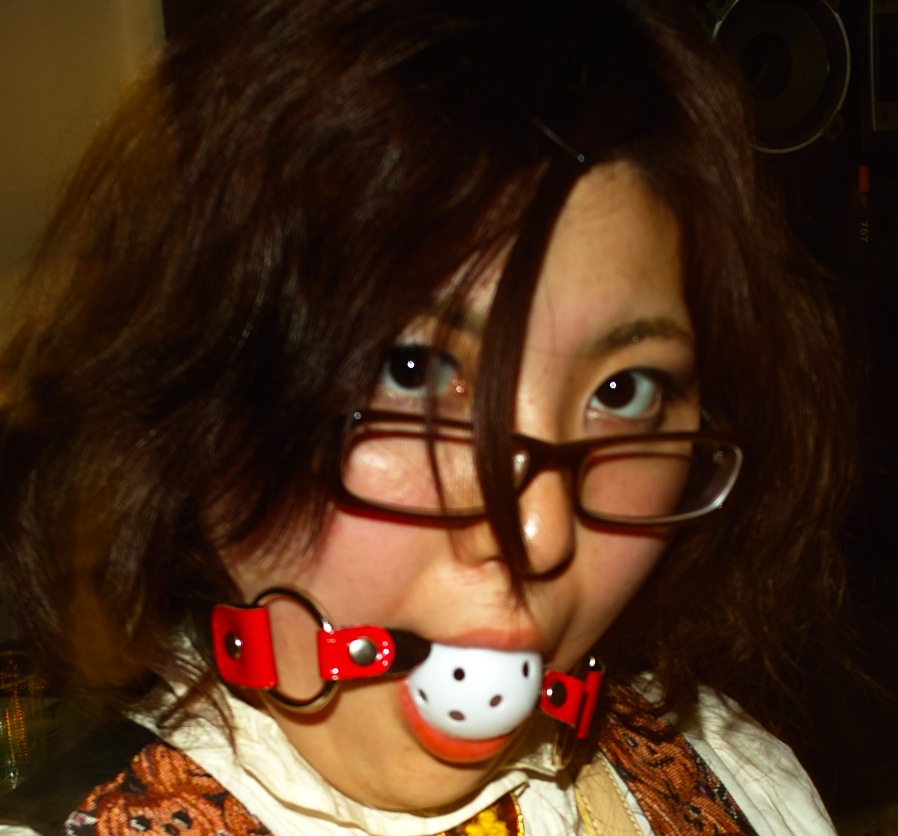
A person wearing a wiffle gag

Waffle gag

A wiffle gag is a simple ball gag that replaces the standard solid rubber ball with a light plastic ball similar to the one used for the game of floorball. It is generally safer due to the constant airflow.

=== Bandit / over-the-nose (OTN) ===
A bandit gag (also known as an over-the-nose or mouth gag) covers the mouth as well as the nose, and is commonly used in Japan and on many cartoons. Without stuffing, it is not very effective.

=== Bit ===
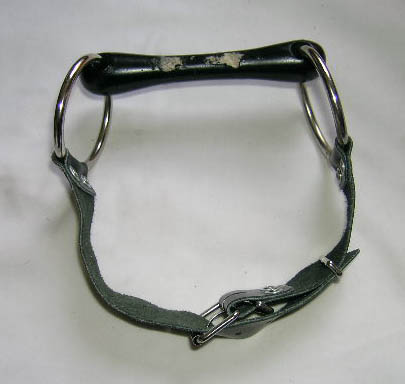
An example of a bit gag

A bit gag is styled like the bit used in a bridle for a horse, and much of its sexual appeal stems from fetishistic symbolism in pony play.

It consists of a bar that is held in place in the wearer's mouth by straps or other devices. Unlike the metal bit that is most common in horse bridles, the bar of a bit gag is usually a soft rubber cylinder. It is not very effective in preventing speech, unless combined with mouth stuffing, although it will make it somewhat more difficult for the wearer to produce coherent speech. Occasionally, reins are attached. Because of the possibility of injury to the lips, the bit gag is not suitable for rough play.

=== Butterfly ===
A butterfly gag is a wing-shaped gag that is usually inflatable by means of a rubber bulb. The central part fits behind the teeth to fill up the mouth, while the wings go between the teeth and the lips. The gag inflates in the shape of a butterfly. This kind of gag is very hard to keep in the wearer; the use of an O-ring in front of the gag strapped to the back of the head will hold the butterfly gag in place.

=== Cleave ===
A more effective variant of the over-the-mouth gag is called the cleave gag. Instead of being tied over the person's mouth, the scarf or cloth is pulled between their teeth. While such a gag of thin material is not very effective, a thick scarf can be used to hold their mouth open. Cleave gags are difficult to remove as they are between the teeth, not over the mouth. When it is applied properly, the gagged person's speech is muffled, but not completely silenced.

=== Detective / over-the-mouth (OTM) ===
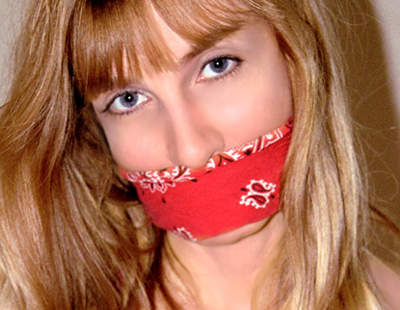
A person wearing an over-the-mouth gag

The detective gag, or over-the-mouth gag (sometimes abbreviated to OTM), is often described in fiction (particularly crime serials) as preventing the subject from speaking through the use of soft materials such as scarves or bandannas. The long scarf or bandanna is pulled over the subject's mouth and tied at the back of his/her head. In practice, it does not silence the subject very effectively. Images of OTM gags, usually applied on women, have been prevalent since the film serials of the early 1900s. For this reason, the OTM gag is associated with the typical damsel in distress. OTM gags are often combined with stuff gags to make them more effective in silencing the wearer.

=== Forniphilic ===
A forniphilic gag is a type of gag that has the primary purpose of objectifying or humiliating the wearer. The term forniphilic comes from the word forniphilia, which is the incorporation of a bound person into furniture or other objects. The gag becomes a mounting point for a tool or other device which allows a slave to perform a task or service for their master or mistress. When employing the gag, the slave's hands are usually bound behind them so they have no other option than to control the tool with the gag. In order to provide stability and to allow the slave to control the tool, a muzzle gag with a mouthpiece is commonly used as a base for attaching the tool.

Types of tool or device can include the following:

- A dildo or vibrator
- An ashtray
- A toilet brush
- A feather duster
- A boot or floor brush

Gags employing a dildo or vibrator are readily available from online retailers; ashtray gags are also popular, but to a lesser extent. Other types of forniphilic gags are much more difficult to source.

=== Funnel ===
A funnel gag consists of a funnel with a tube leading from its spout into the mouth, usually with straps to hold the tube in. Such a gag can be used to help a bound person to drink a fluid. Note that it is very easy to choke during such drinking. This is commonly used in Water sports.

=== Hand ===
A hand over the mouth can be used as a gag. When hand gagging someone without consent, a person usually grabs the victim from behind since the victim cannot see this coming. Then, the person firmly places their unfolded hand over the victim's closed mouth. Then they may pull the victim into their body for extra leverage and control. Handgags are common in thrillers and are often associated with damsel-in-distress phenomena.

=== Harness ===
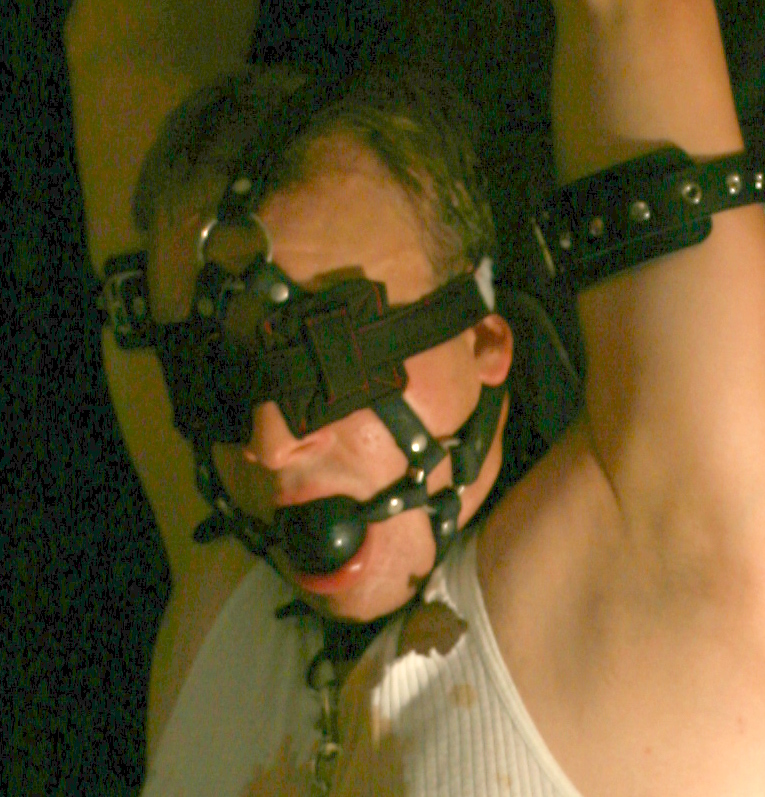
A man wearing a head harness with ball gag

A harness gag encircles the head, with straps generally secured by buckles fastened at the back. Head harnesses are most commonly used to provide points of attachments to secure various kinds of gags, such as ball gags, bit gags, muzzle gags and ring gags; although they also have other uses, such as providing attachment points for other forms of bondage, or may be used simply for their psychological effect. Head harnesses may also function as a gag by themselves, by restricting the ability to open the mouth, or have a mouth cover as an integral part.

Head harnesses, like many other forms of bondage, also have the effect of creating a sense of objectification and erotic helplessness in the wearer, which can be erotic for the wearer, or for those observing them. Many head harnesses are designed with straps that pass in front of the wearer's eyes, restricting their vision, and further increasing the sense of objectification and erotic subjection.

=== Inflatable ===
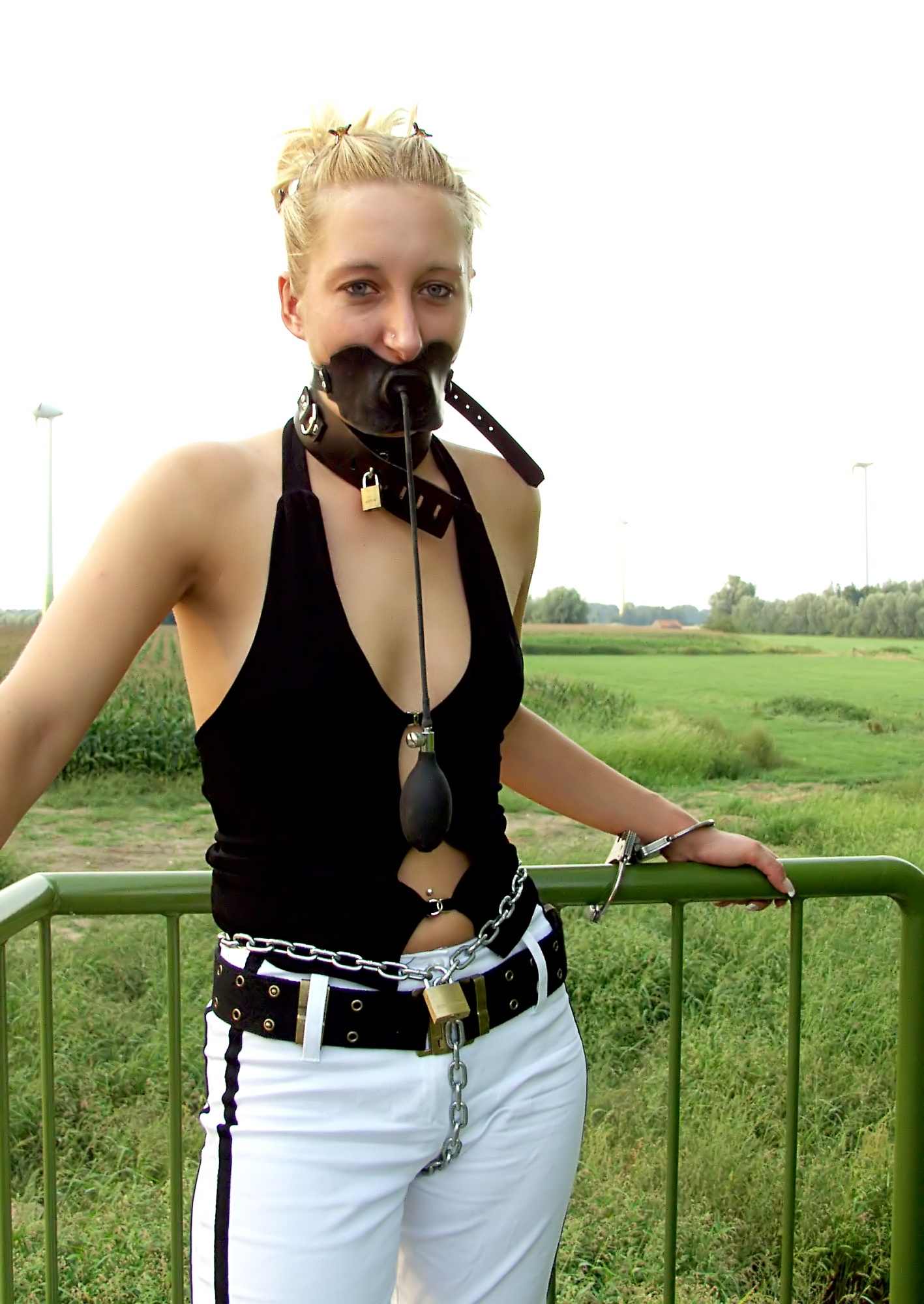
Photomodel Jassi in chains and gagged with an inflatable balloon-gag

An inflatable gag is usually a rubber balloon which is inflated by a hand valve. Most inflatable gags will not hold in the gagged person's mouth well, so the gag is usually paired with a ring gag to keep it in place.

=== Knotted ===
A knotted gag is a blend of the ball and cleave gags. The scarf either has a knot tied in the middle and placed in the gagged person's mouth or is an over-the-mouth gag (OTM) placed backward with the knot tied inside the person's mouth. The knotted gag is able to soak up the saliva that the ball gag does not and can be easily washed for reuse. Knots can be doubled or tripled to fit the size of the gagged person's mouth.

=== Layered ===
This is a term for a series of gags over each other; for example, an over-the-mouth gag (OTM) over a cleave gag. Another piece of cloth could be tied under the gagged person's chin in conjunction with an OTM gag.

=== Medical ===
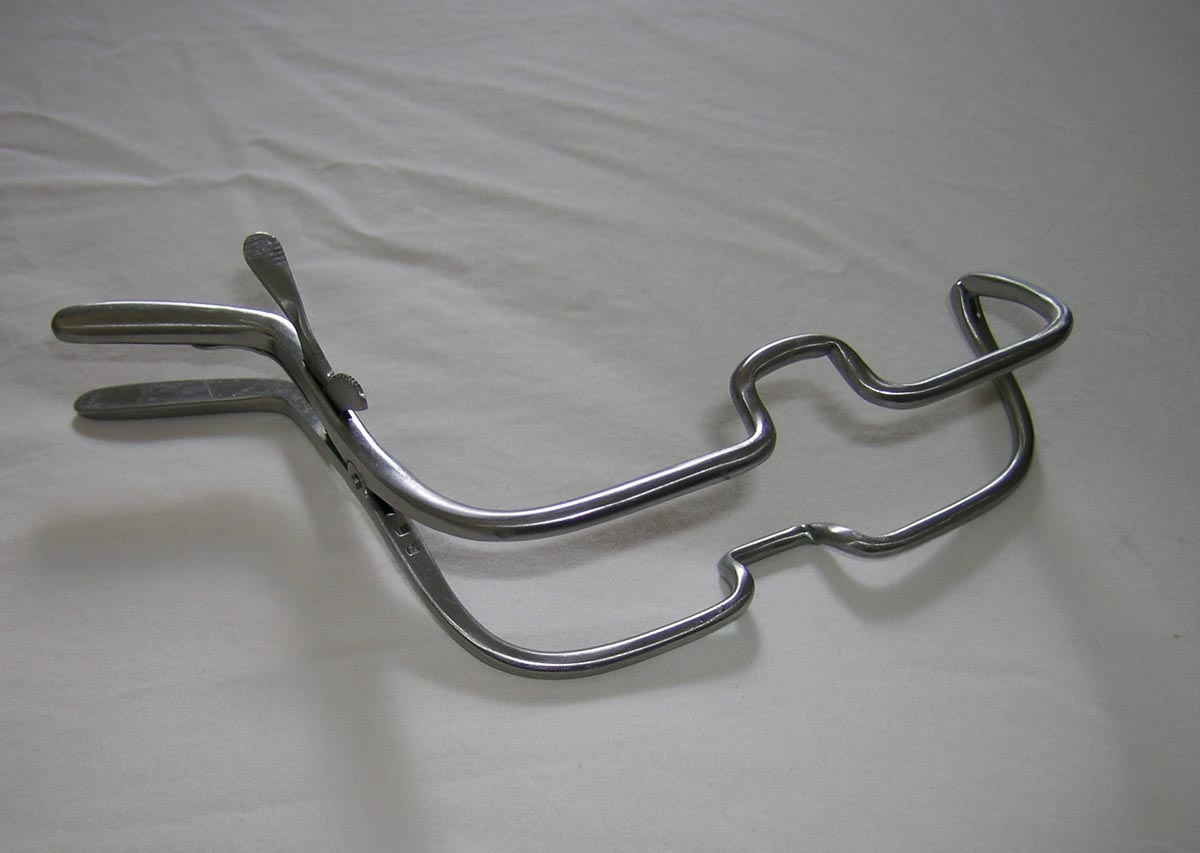
Jennings gag

Bondage pornography also depicts the use of medical gags such as the Whitehead and Jennings gag in BDSM contexts. Such gags allow unlimited access to the mouth. They stop coherent speech, but do little to silence a person.

=== Mouth corset ===
A mouth corset is a type of neck corset that covers both the neck and the mouth.

Incorporating a gag into a neck corset presents a few safety issues: should the wearer begin to choke, it is not easy to remove the gag quickly. For this reason, most mouth corsets use a simple muzzle gag that merely covers the mouth and does not force anything into the mouth, thus minimising the risk.

Despite not forcing anything into the mouth, mouth corsets are usually very effective in gagging the victim. This is due to the fact that the chin piece prevents the wearer from opening their mouth and dislodging the gag, and the lacing at the back of the corset holds the gag tightly against the mouth, making a very effective seal. In addition, it compresses the wearer's cheeks.

=== Mouthguard ===
This gag has two mouthguards, similar to those worn by football and hockey players. One rests on the lower teeth of the wearer while the other is against the top. Again, like sports mouthguards, these mouthguards can be softened in boiling water to fit to the mouth of the wearer. The mouthguards are attached to a front faceplate, like most plug gags, and straps from the front to the back.

=== Muzzle ===
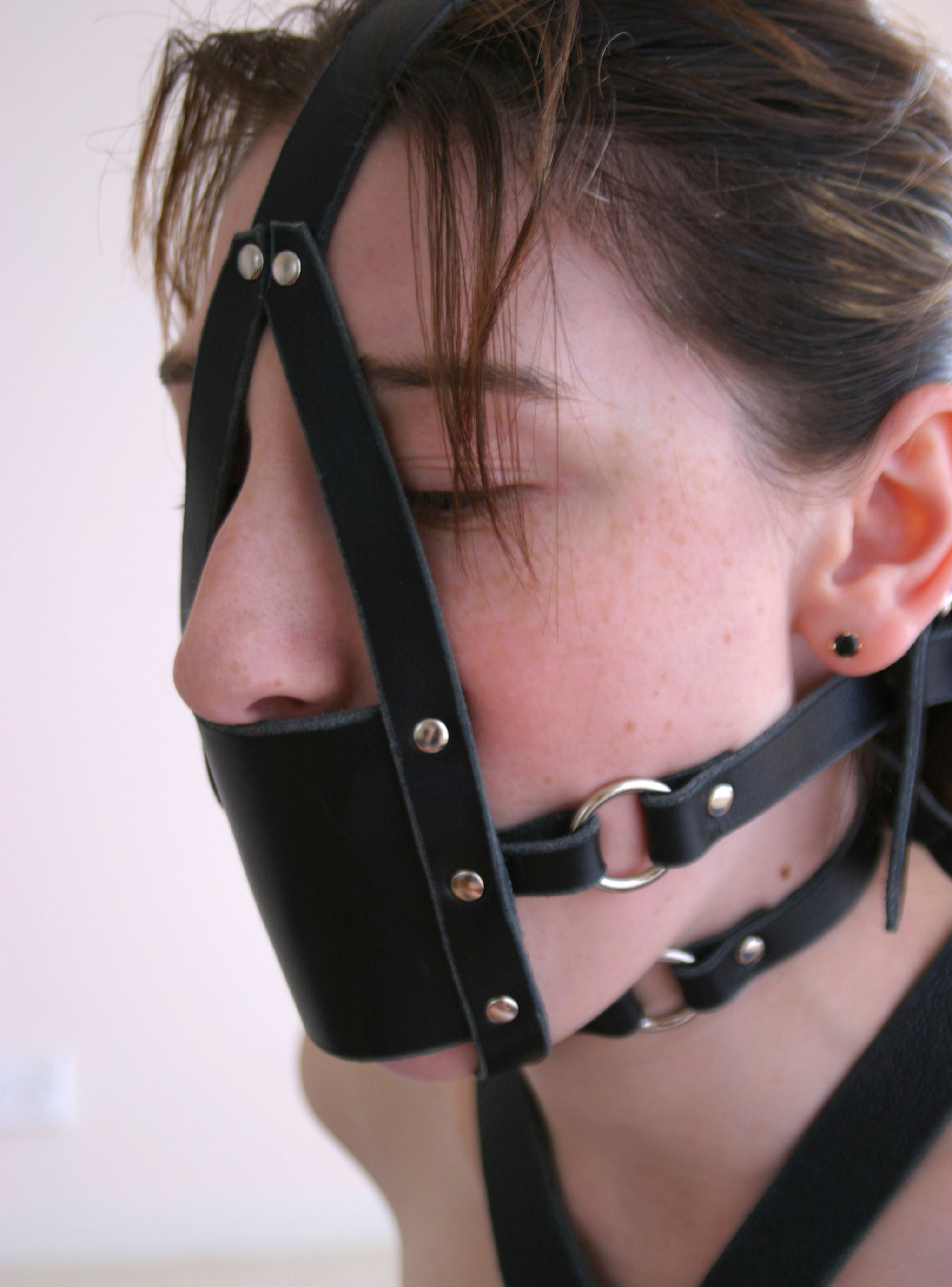
A person wearing a muzzle gag

A muzzle gag works in a similar way as an over-the-mouth gag, only that they are usually made of leather, are fastened around the head with buckles and straps, and cover the lower part of the face. It is so called because it resembles a muzzle used on animals, with a flexible pad which straps over the mouth, and sometimes also around the cheeks and chin. Muzzle gags have a strong psychological effect on some people, because of the association of being restrained in a way generally associated with animals. Restricting movement of the jaw and covering the cheeks can both increase the efficiency of a gag. It is difficult to draw the line between a muzzle gag and a head harness with an attached gag.

Muzzle gags are probably one of the oldest gags and illustrations showing muzzle-like gag devices such as scold's bridles have been observed from early colonial times.

A muzzle gag may also have an attached posture collar and may also be fitted with an integrated pecker gag.

=== Pacifier ===
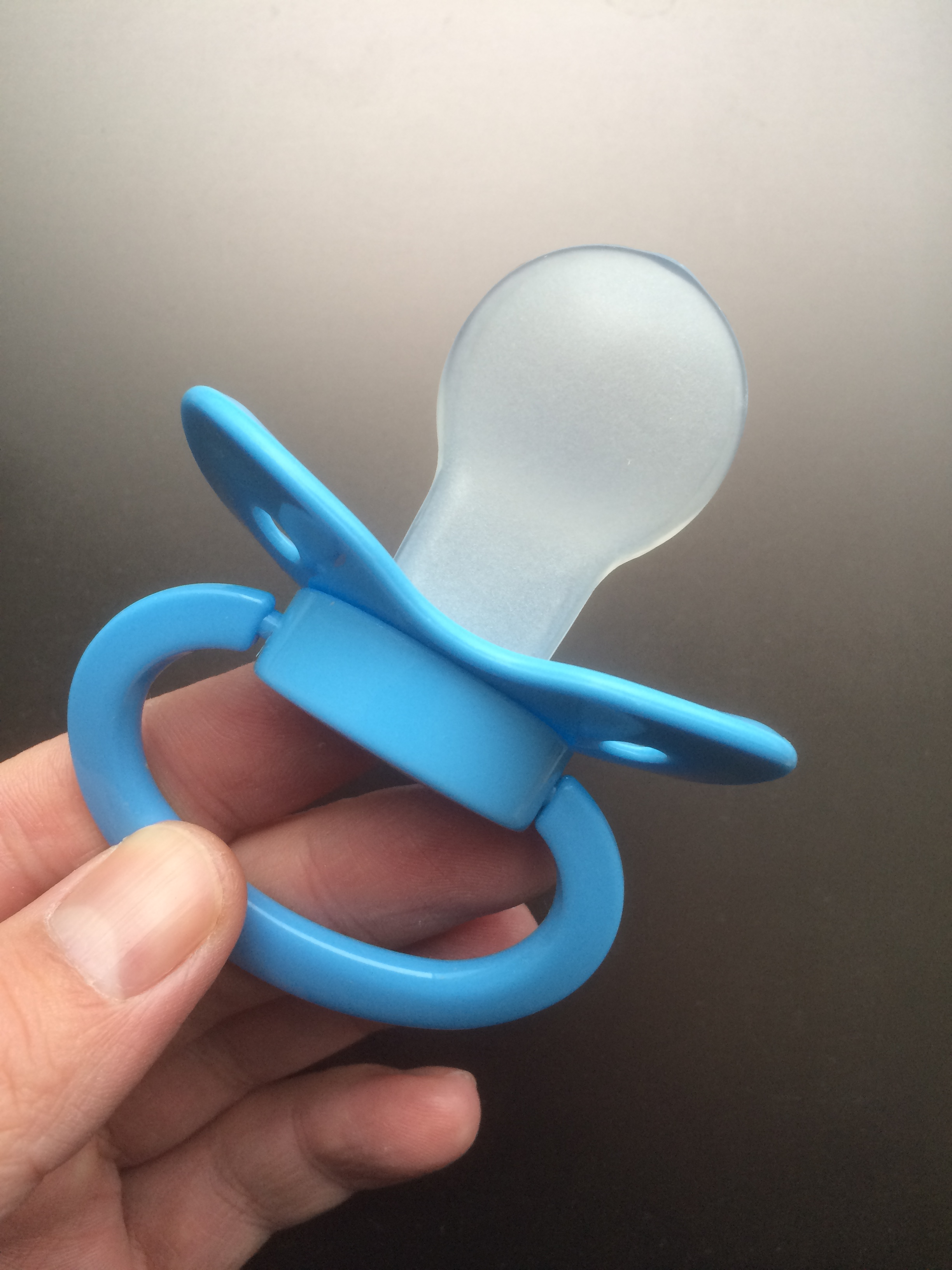
An adult pacifier

A pacifier, or 'dummy' is by design a gag without any alteration. It can be used to quiet a person, and even strapped in place to prevent removal. Pacifiers are orthodontic and designed to be placed in the mouth. They are very comfortable and soft, and remove the violent connotations of a gag. The wearer's mouth is essentially being plugged.

=== Panel ===
A panel gag is similar to a muzzle gag, except it lacks a head harness.

=== Pecker ===
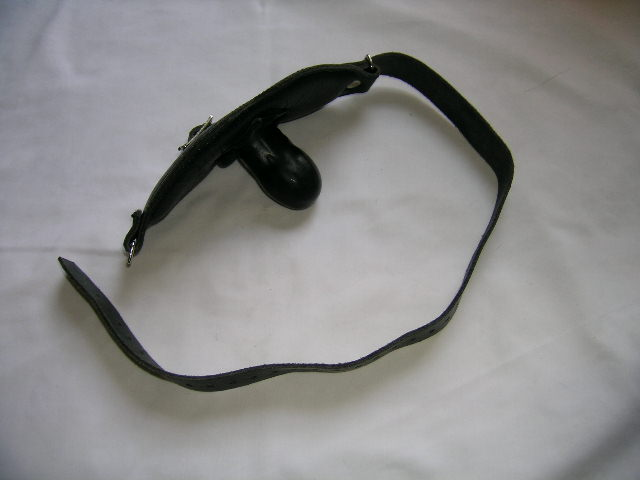
A pecker (penis) gag

A pecker or penis gag is a gag that has a bulge resembling a phallus (erect penis) or a nipple that is placed into the mouth to enable the wearer to suck on it in a manner similar to an adult pacifier. The use of a phallic shape is intended to give it an erotic connotation, but it may be a large knob — similar to a ball gag — or may be inflatable. The pecker gag may be wide and flat and large enough almost to fill the mouth, intended to depress the tongue.

To keep the gag in the mouth, it is usually paired with a ring, muzzle or panel gag attached to a strap that buckles behind the head.

=== Ring ===
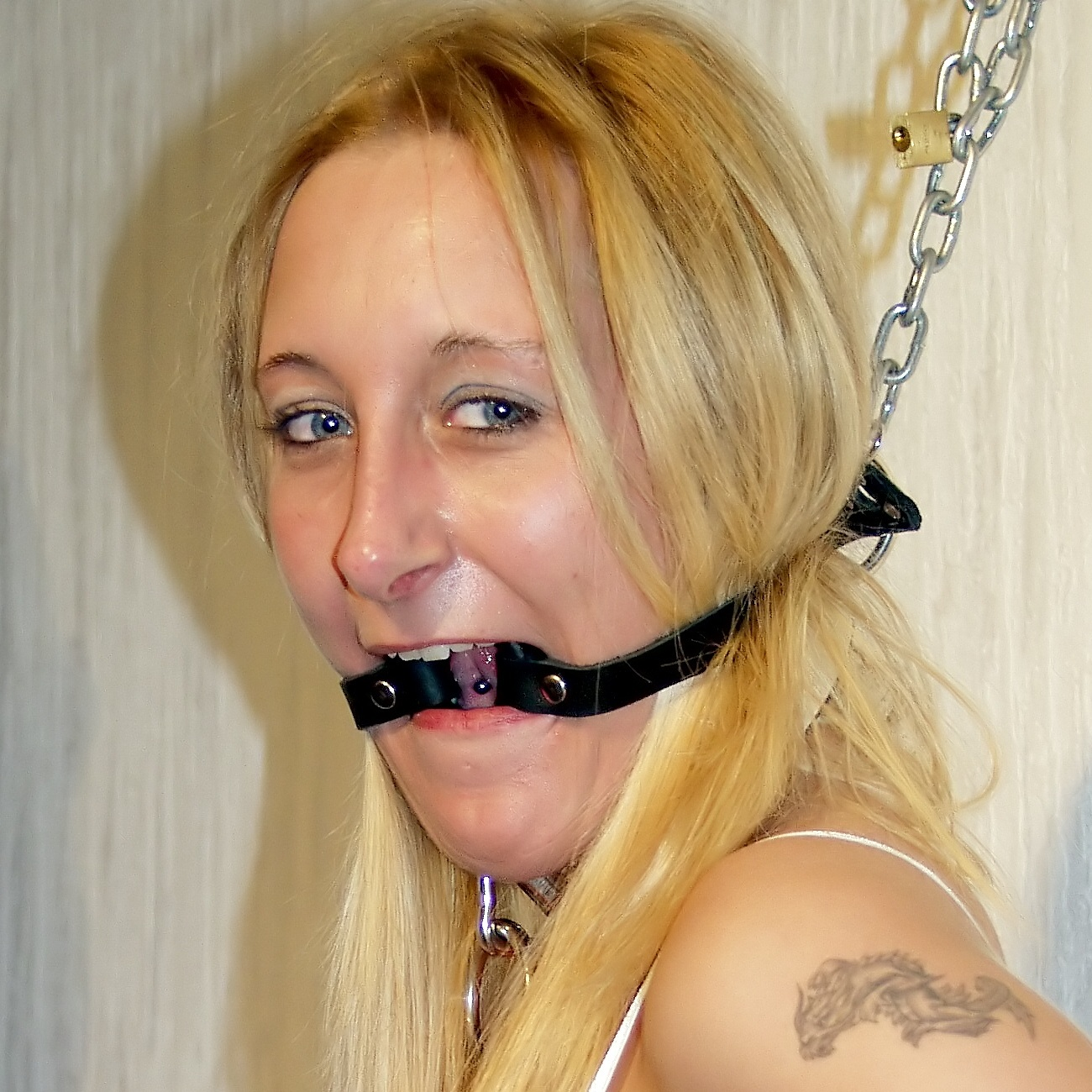
A person wearing a ring gag

A ring gag is similar to a ball gag, except that the ball is replaced by a hollow ring. The ring reduces the risk of choking, and allows access to the mouth. Oral sex may be performed if the ring is big enough.

A ring gag will cause the subject to drool uncontrollably, this often being the purpose of the gag.

=== Rope ===
A rope gag consists of a length of rope wound multiple times through the mouth of the person being gagged – similar to a cleave gag. Soft rope, such as nylon, works well for the comfort of the person being gagged, but rougher rope, such as hemp, will scratch the lips quite a bit. Rope gags can be made into a part of a full-body tie as well, if the person tying the victim up uses the same length of rope for the gag as they do for the tie.

=== Spider gag ===
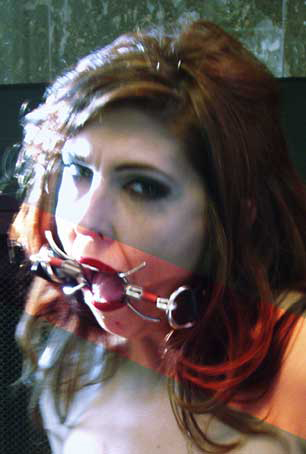
A person wearing a spider gag

A variation on the ring gag, the spider gag has hooks on the sides so as to keep the wearer from flipping the ring horizontally in their mouth. Unlike the ring gag which can be easily flipped, a spider gag is essentially functional and non-decorative. Generally these gags have interchangeable rings so as to accommodate both the wearers' mouth and the size of any object that might be inserted through the ring.

=== Stuff ===
A stuff gag is very similar to, and works in the same way as, the ball gag. The person's mouth is stuffed with handkerchiefs, scarves, socks, hosiery, panties, day sheers, bandanas or any item rolled into a ball, acting as a stopper. To reduce the chances of choking, the stuff gag is never pushed all the way into the person's mouth. Instead, a large part of it hangs out of the mouth, allowing the top to pull it out easily when he/she has to. Sometimes, to further ensure that the gag does not accidentally slip deeper into the person's mouth, the top may use a larger gag. It is then secured with a cleave gag, OTM gag or tape gag.

While it works in preventing speech, a person who has been stuff gagged can easily spit it out by pushing it with his/her tongue. However, it is for this reason that the stuff gag is one of the safest gags to use during self bondage, as the person with his/her hands tied can still spit the gag out if he/she feels any kind of discomfort. However, the risks of asphyxiation and choking are still present for someone who is not careful.

For the more extreme application, a stuff gag can be used in conjunction with a tape gag, effectively rendering the partner completely silent. This practice requires greater caution, since the risk of asphyxiation is high.

=== Tape ===
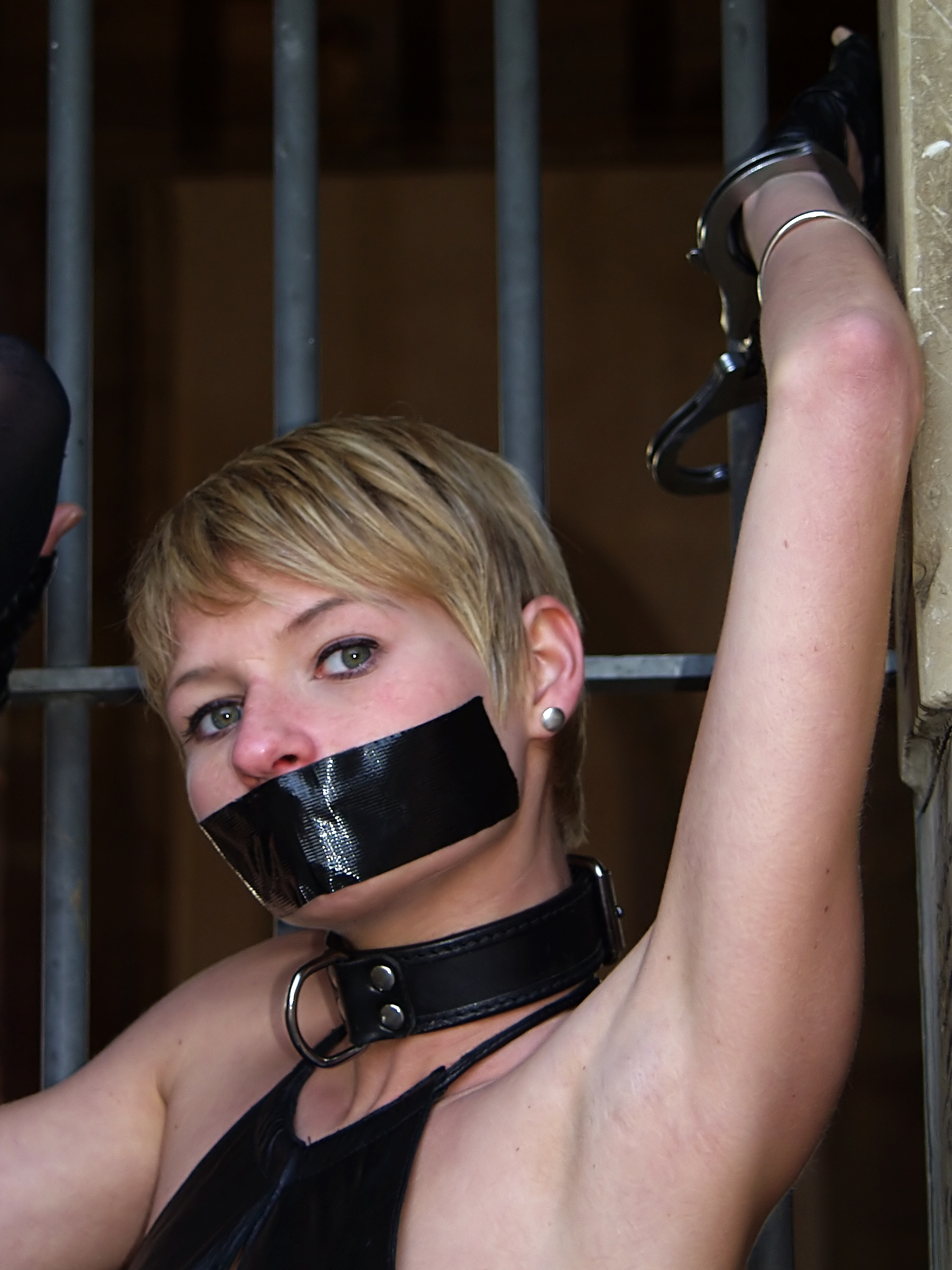
Woman tape-gagged and cuffed to iron bars

A tape gag involves the use of sticky tape over the lips, sealing the mouth shut. Commonly used types of tape include duct tape, gaffer tape and PVC tape from two to three inches wide. Tape gags are often the simplest of gags to apply. If the wearer blows while the tape is on it makes it easier to remove (as they can chew it off), making it not the most effective gag. To better secure the tape, a long strip of tape can be wrapped around the lower part of the person's head. A strip from ear to ear under the jaw restricts jaw movement, making the gag more effective. However, the tape can cause the skin on the lips to be ripped off and it can irritate the lips and cause fever blisters in those who have dormant fever blisters or cold sores. If left on for long, it will cause the wearer pain for the tape to be removed from their mouth. The tape can also rip hair off when wrapped around the head, despite making the gag more difficult to get off. The longer the tape is left on, the harder and more painful it is to later remove from the skin.

The dominant may use tape during a roleplay where a ball gag will be inappropriate; for example, a kidnapper and captive scene that does not immediately lead to sex. Tape gags are commonly used in crime thrillers where the villains wish to prevent the victims from speaking.

While tape gags can be combined with stuff gags for enhanced bondage, it is easy for one to choke on the stuffing inside of the mouth.

=== Tube ===
A tube gag uses a tube instead of a ring. It allows easy breathing, but not much access to the mouth. It is also possible to have a tube through the ball of a ball gag.

== See also ==
- Scold's bridle
