= Fuck It Up =

Single by Iggy Azalea featuring Kash Doll

from the album In My Defense
- Released: 19 July 2019
- Genre: Hip hop
- Length: 2:52
- Label: Bad Dreams; Empire
- Songwriters: Amethyst Kelly; Arkeisha Knight
- Producer: J. White Did It

Iggy Azalea singles chronology
"Boys Like You" (2019)	"Fuck It Up" (2019)	"Lola" (2019)

Kash Doll singles chronology
"Ready Set" (2019)	"Fuck It Up" (2019)	"Supahood" (2019)

Music video
- "Fuck It Up" on YouTube

"Fuck It Up" is a song recorded by Australian rapper Iggy Azalea for her second studio album In My Defense (2019). It was released as the third and final single on 19 July 2019, the day of the album's release. The song features vocals from American rapper Kash Doll and was produced by J. White Did It, who served as an executive producer on In My Defense and produced the album's previous two singles, "Sally Walker" and "Started". It was released by Bad Dreams Records (Azalea's own record label) and Empire Distribution.

Commercially the song peaked within the top 40 on the New Zealand Hot Singles chart.

The music video begins with Azalea working as a hotel receptionist and meeting an old friend from high school, discovering that their reunion is about to take place but she and Kash Doll were not invited. The rest of the video sees the two rappers spending time in a bedroom and restaurant before finally attending the reunion itself, where they win an award together. YouTube personality Nikita Dragun makes a cameo appearance in the video.

== Background and release ==
After her 2018 departure from Island Records following the release of her extended play Survive the Summer, Azalea began working on her second album. She specifically specified that she wanted the album to be for her fans to enjoy as, in her words, "critics have literally never given any album I've made a good review". Azalea teased the song in early 2019 while working on her album; the song later had snippets uploaded to YouTube and a music video for the song was shot from June to July 2019. When the album was released, "Fuck It Up" was quickly announced as In My Defense's third single and, after disappointing sales compared to the album's previous singles and Azalea's announcement of a follow-up extended play in Wicked Lips, it became the final release from the album.

== Music video ==
A music video for the song was shot on 11 July 2019, it was later uploaded to Azalea's YouTube channel on 19 July 2019. As of July 2020, the music video has 35 million views. The video begins with Azalea working as a hotel receptionist and meeting an old friend from high school, discovering that their reunion is about to take place but she and Kash Doll were not invited. The rest of the video sees the two rappers spending time in a bedroom and restaurant before finally attending the reunion itself, where they win an award together. YouTube personality Nikita Dragun makes a cameo appearance in the video. The music video was inspired by the American comedy film Romy and Michele's High School Reunion.

== Charts ==
Chart performance for "Fuck It Up"
Chart (2019)	Peak position
New Zealand Hot Singles (RMNZ)	40

== Release history ==
Release history and formats for "Fuck It Up"
Region	Date	Format	Label	Ref.
Various	19 July 2019	Digital download; streaming	Bad Dreams; Empire	
