= East Atlanta Santa 3 =

Mixtape by Gucci Mane
- Released: December 20, 2019
- Recorded: 2019
- Genre: Trap
- Length: 43:08
- Label: Atlantic; GUWOP
- Producer: Gucci Mane (exec.); Da Honorable C.N.O.T.E.; Doughboy; J. White Did It; Metro Boomin; Murda Beatz; Doughboy; Zaytoven; Spiffy Global; Dre Moon; Chophouze; Derelle Rideout; Taz Taylor

Gucci Mane chronology
Woptober II (2019)	East Atlanta Santa 3 (2019)	So Icy Summer (2020)

Singles from East Atlanta Santa 3
- 1. "Jingle Bales Intro" Released: December 20, 2019; 2. "She Miss Me" Released: December 20, 2019

East Atlanta Santa 3 is the seventy-eighth mixtape by American rapper Gucci Mane. It was released on December 20, 2019 by Atlantic Records and GUWOP Enterprises. The mixtape is Gucci Mane's third project of 2019, following June 2019's Delusions of Grandeur and October 2019's Woptober II, and features 16 tracks. The project includes guest appearances from Kranium, Jason Derulo, Asian Doll, Rich the Kid and Quavo.

Professional ratings
Review scores
Source	Rating
AllMusic	3/5 stars

== Singles ==
The lead single off the mixtape is "Jingle Bales Intro", which was released alongside the project on December 20, 2019. Its music video premiered on Gucci Mane's YouTube channel on December 18, 2019, two days before its actual official release. The second single released is "She Miss Me", which released on December 20, 2019, alongside the mixtape. It has a guest appearance from American rapper Rich the Kid. Its music video arrived on the same day as the song.

== Track listing ==
Credits adapted from Tidal, HipHopDX, and Gucci Mane's Instagram.

No.	Title	Writer(s)	Producer(s)	Length
1.	"Jingle Bales Intro"	Radric Davis; Anthony White	J. White Did It	2:26
2.	"Mr. Wop"	Davis; White	J. White Did It	3:13
3.	"M's On Ice"	Davis; White	J. White Did It	3:10
4.	"Drummer" (featuring Kranium)	Davis; Kemar Donaldson; White	J. White Did It	2:04
5.	"More" (with Jason Derulo)	Davis; Jason Desrouleaux; Spiffy Global	Spiffy Global	3:09
6.	"Magic City" (featuring Asian Doll)	Davis; Misharron Jermeisha Allen; Leland Wayne; Dre Moon	Metro Boomin; Dre Moon	3:46
7.	"Dirty Dancer"	Davis; White	J. White Did It	3:40
8.	"Snow"	Davis; White; Brian McKnight; Wanya Morris	J. White Did It	2:30
9.	"She Miss Me" (featuring Rich the Kid)	Davis; Dimitri Roger; Wayne; Dre Moon; Bradley Brandon	Metro Boomin; Dre Moon; Doughboy	2:36
10.	"Brick Mason"	Davis; Shane Lee Lindstrom	Murda Beatz	1:38
11.	"Tony" (featuring Quavo)	Davis; Quavious Marshall; Carlton Mays, Jr.	Da Honorable C.N.O.T.E. Taz Taylor	2:34
12.	"Gossip"	Davis; Xavier Dotson	Zaytoven; ChopHouze	2:29
13.	"Time Flies By"	Davis; Dotson	Zaytoven	2:17
14.	"Slide" (featuring Quavo)	Davis; Marshall; Mays Jr.; Darrell Richard	Da Honorable C.N.O.T.E; Derelle Rideout	3:10
15.	"12 Days of Christmas"	Davis; White; Peter Wilhousky	J. White Did It	1:52
16.	"WWGD Outro"	Davis; Dotson	Zaytoven	2:13
Total length:				43:08

== Charts ==
Chart (2020)	Peak position
US Billboard 200	68
