= Stacked (disambiguation) =

Stacked is an American sitcom which aired in 2005 and 2006.

Stacked may also refer to:

- Stacked (film), a 2008 British television series pilot
- Stacked with Daniel Negreanu, also known as simply Stacked, a poker video game released in 2006
- Stacked (album), 2019 debut album of American rapper Kash Doll
