= How It's Done =

How It's Done may refer to:

- "How It's Done" (Kash Doll, Kim Petras, Alma and Stefflon Don song), 2019
- "How It's Done" (Huntrix song), 2025
