= Big Booty (Gucci Mane song) =

2019 single by Gucci Mane featuring Megan Thee Stallion

Single by Gucci Mane featuring Megan Thee Stallion

from the album Woptober II
- Released: October 4, 2019
- Length: 2:08
- Label: Atlantic; GUWOP
- Songwriters: Radric Davis; Megan Pete; Anthony White; Richard Evans; David Hobbs; Mark Ross; Christopher Wongwon
- Producer: J. White Did It

Gucci Mane singles chronology
"Richer Than Errybody" (2019)	"Big Booty" (2019)	"Tootsies" (2019)

Megan Thee Stallion singles chronology
"Hot Girl Summer" (2019)	"Big Booty" (2019)	"All Dat" (2019)

Music video
- "Big Booty" on YouTube

"Big Booty" is a song by American rapper Gucci Mane, released on October 4, 2019 as the second single from his fourteenth studio album Woptober II (2019). It features American rapper-songwriter Megan Thee Stallion. Produced by J. White Did It, the song contains a sample of "Hoochie Mama" by 2 Live Crew.

== Composition and lyrics ==
The song has a "rugged" beat that uses a sample of "Hoochie Mama". Gucci Mane expresses his attraction to "thick" women, while Megan Thee Stallion raps about her sexual attractiveness ("Big old ass is heavy, shake that shit like jelly / Put me on your plate and slurp that shit up like spaghetti / Man, I make this shit look easy, I ain't tryin', I just be me / I ain't never met a ho I felt like I had to compete with, uh").

== Critical reception ==
Michael Saponara of Billboard praised Megan Thee Stallion's feature, writing "Being unafraid to get low and break it down, Tina Snow made for the perfect guest on the bootylicious, J. White Did It-produced single."

== Music video ==
The music video was directed by Eif Rivera and released on October 10, 2019. It finds the rappers being surrounded by twerking female dancers; Gucci Mane is seen alongside dancers in red latex who are twerking on raised platforms, as well as expensive cars. Megan Thee Stallion also twerks while atop a stallion in the clouds and wearing a cowboy hat, and shows a fire lasso.

== Charts ==
Chart (2019–2020)	Peak position
US Bubbling Under Hot 100 (Billboard)	4
US Rhythmic Airplay (Billboard)	24

== Certifications ==
Region	Certification	Certified units/sales
United States (RIAA)	Platinum	1,000,000^{‡}
^{‡} Sales+streaming figures based on certification alone.
