= Loud Pack =

Loud Pack may refer to:

- Loud Pack (album), of 2011 by Project Pat
- Loudpvck, the American DJ and electronic music producer
