= J. White Did It =

- Also known as: J. White
- Born: Anthony Jermaine White; December 17, 1984 (age 41); Leavenworth, Kansas, U.S.
- Genres: Hip hop; trap
- Occupations: Record producer; songwriter; disc jockey
- Instruments: Keyboard; sampler
- Years active: 2005–present
- Label: Kobalt

Anthony Jermaine White (born December 17, 1984), known professionally as J. White Did It, is an American record producer, songwriter, and DJ from Blytheville, Arkansas. White has produced three Billboard Hot 100-number one singles: "Bodak Yellow" (2017) and "I Like It" (2018) both for Cardi B, as well as "Savage Remix" (2020) for Megan Thee Stallion. The latter won a Grammy Award, along with his 2018 production, "A Lot" by 21 Savage.

== Early life ==
White was born on December 17, 1984, in Blytheville, Arkansas. He grew up in the cities of Kansas City and Leavenworth in Kansas. His father was a church singer and played guitar, his mother was also a church singer, his grandmother and uncle played drums. "At 15, I knew I couldn't play football. I was like, 'Oh, I'm not that good. I'm not that tall. I'm fast, but I'm not that fast. Really skinny,'" he said. He started making beats at the age of 16. At age 17, his uncle brought him his first keyboard, "Honestly, I thought when I got that keyboard that I was gonna be rich the next year. It's fixing to be a breeze. Literally, it wasn't." He graduated from Leavenworth High School.

== Career ==
In 2005, White moved to New York City where he started learning how to produce records. There, he met Klenord "Shaft" Raphael, a producer who later went on to become his mentor and manager, who taught him how to sample songs. That summer, he moved back home to Kansas City, and, for the next ten years, worked as a janitor, a DJ, and a producer around the cities of Kansas, Dallas, Atlanta, and Los Angeles. During this period of time, he produced beats for several artists including Stevie Stone, Krizz Kaliko, Eric Bellinger, and Lyrica Anderson, but his music career wasn't taking off. He told The Kansas City Star that he wasn't getting credit on a lot of records he produced at the time.

In 2016, his manager Shaft invited him to his house in New York to ask him for beats. There, he met with Bronx rapper Cardi B, one of Shaft's other clients. "I began to work with her and I believed in what she believed in. We just all became one big happy family, and marched on to the promised land," he said. Their first collaboration was for 2016 promotional single "What a Girl Likes", followed by a number of songs from Cardi B's second mixtape, Gangsta Bitch Music, Vol. 2 (2017), including the Offset-assisted single "Lick".

In 2017, White produced Cardi B's major-label debut single "Bodak Yellow (Money Moves)". The song topped the US Billboard Hot 100 chart for three consecutive weeks, becoming the first song produced by him to achieve this spot. It also won Single of the Year at the 2017 BET Hip Hop Awards and Favorite Rap/Hip Hop Song at the 2018 American Music Awards. In September of that year, he signed a deal with rights management and publishing company Kobalt Music Group.

In 2018, he produced "I Like It", another single by Cardi B, Bad Bunny and J Balvin. The song also topped the Billboard Hot 100 chart, becoming his second number one. Billboard staff, Los Angeles Times, and Apple Music's editorial selection ranked it as the best song of the year. It was nominated for Record of the Year at the 61st Annual Grammy Awards.

White executive produced Iggy Azalea's second studio album In My Defense (2019), including its lead single "Sally Walker". The song peaked at number 62 on the Billboard Hot 100. He also produced the tracks "Started" and "Freak of the Weak".

J White is managed by Lucas Keller, Nic Warner and Chad Wes at Milk & Honey, and published by Sony Music Publishing for the world.

=== Grammy Awards ===
Year	Work	Category	Result	Ref.
2018	"Bodak Yellow" (Cardi B)	Best Rap Song	Nominated	
2019	"I Like It" (Cardi B, Bad Bunny & J Balvin)	Record of the Year	Nominated	
2020	"A Lot" (21 Savage feat. J. Cole)	Best Rap Song	Won	
2021	"Savage (Remix)" (Megan Thee Stallion feat. Beyoncé)	Record of the Year	Nominated	
2021	"Savage (Remix)" (Megan Thee Stallion feat. Beyoncé)	Best Rap Song	Won	

== Personal life ==
White's mother was murdered on January 28, 2015, due to domestic violence, leading to what he recalls as "one of the lowest years of [his] life." He told The Kansas City Star that in 2016, "I was in a bad place. Everything felt like it was falling down on me. [...] My relationship with the mother of my kids was bad, I was broke. [...] The industry wasn't giving me any chances. I was just wanting to give up on everything: producing, life, all of that." He had attempted suicide twice that year.

== Artistry ==
White claimed that he lets his beats and melodies come to him naturally: "I just let the spirit guide me, I just go with the flow, man. So if I feel like playing piano first or lighting some candles or doing jumping jacks, I do that. There can be no set rule for me making music". He believes hip hop records should come naturally and quickly: "I don't really believe in spending a lot of time [on hip hop records]," he told DJ Booth, adding, "If the energy is there and it hits you, it will hit you automatically. It doesn't take long to create great energy." He admitted that he created the beat for Cardi B's "Bodak Yellow" in 15 minutes only. Similar to Mike Will Made It, White makes it known with his full moniker "J. White Did It" that he's responsible for the beat. "I was like 'Oh, OK. My name is, like, everybody's name.' So I put the 'Did It' on to just be... If I didn't do it, I don't know who did." His producer tagline, "J. White, I need a beat, I can go off on (Ooh)," drops at the beginning of his songs.

== Production discography ==
=== Charted songs ===
Title	Year	Peak chart positions							Album
Title	Year	US	US R&B/HH	AUS	CAN	IRE	NZ	UK	Album
"Bodak Yellow" (Cardi B)	2017	1	1	33	6	51	24	24	Invasion of Privacy
"Money Bag" (Cardi B)	2018	58	32	—	84	—	—	—	Invasion of Privacy
"I Like It" (Cardi B, Bad Bunny, and J Balvin)	2018	1	1	14	2	10	7	8	Invasion of Privacy
"Money" (Cardi B)	2018	13	7	65	30	35	36	35	Non-album single
"A Lot" (21 Savage featuring J. Cole)	2019	12	5	61	21	25	26	29	I Am > I Was
"Sally Walker" (Iggy Azalea)	2019	62	30	—	56	70	—	82	In My Defense
"Started" (Iggy Azalea)	2019	120	—	—	—	73	—	76	In My Defense
"Savage" (Megan Thee Stallion either solo or remix featuring Beyoncé)	2020	1	1	4	9	3	2	3	Suga
"What It Is (Block Boy)" (Doechii)	2024	29	8	—	31	95	13	69	Non-album single

== Production credits ==
Adapted from White's official SoundCloud page and Genius.com.

Artist(s)	Year	Album	Song(s)
Gena	2011	Non-album song	00. "My Dip in the Club" (featuring Yo Gotti and Yung Joc)
Ron Artest	2011	Go Loco	00. "Go Loco" (featuring George Lopez, Taz, Lenny Santos, Max Santos, Fat Joe, and B-Real)
Six D	2012	Non-album song	00. "2 Seconds"
T'Melle	2012	Non-album song	00. "Go to War" (featuring Waka Flocka Flame)
B-Hamp	2012	Non-album song	00. "Go to Work"
Assata Jones	2013	Non-album song	00. "Dance on Me (Dirty)" (featuring Tink)
T'Melle	2013	The Interview	09. "Baby"
Stevie Stone	2013	2 Birds 1 Stone	03. "Get Out My Face" (featuring Krizz Kaliko); 11. "Boomerang" (featuring Krizz Kaliko); 13. "She Go"; 14. "Let It Beat"
Krizz Kaliko	2013	Son of Sam	06. "Girls Like That" (featuring Bizzy); 12. "Night Time"
Lyrica Anderson	2014	King Me 2	06. Feenin (featuring Kevin Gates)
Eric Bellinger	2014	Choose Up Season	02. "Valet" (featuring TeeFlii and Pleasure P)
Troy Nōka	2014	Gotta Rep the Town	03. "Let It All Workout"; 05. "Slow It Down"
Bobby V	2015	Non-album song	00. "Bad Habit" (with Pleasure P and Ray J)
Stevie Stone	2015	Malta Bend	11. "Get Fucked Up"; 13. "Wait on It" (featuring Ces Cru)
Plies	2015	Ain't No Mixtape Bih	12. "Fuck Me"
Fat Pimp	2015	Non-album song	00. "Uh Oh" (featuring J. White Did It)
Tre Ward	2015	TooManyNights	05. "Anymore"
Lyrica Anderson	2015	Hello	01. "Hello"
Eric Bellinger	2015	Cuffing Season, Pt. 2	02. "Valet" (featuring 2 Chainz and Fetty Wap)
Krizz Kaliko	2016	GO	17. "You See It (Buss It)"
Cardi B	2016	Underestimated: The Album	06. "What a Girl Likes"
Cardi B	2017	Gangsta Bitch Music, Vol. 2	01. "Bronx Season"; 02. "Lick" (featuring Offset); 05. "Leave That Bitch Alone"
Troy Nōka	2017	Gotta Rep the Town 2	02. "Be Dat"; 04. "Flow Crime"; 08. "Do It Like Me"; 14. "Bars for Dee"
LeToya Luckett	2017	Back 2 Life	04. "Used To"
Notty Taylor	2017	Non-album song	00. "Died Last Year"
HoodCelebrityy	2017	Trap vs. Reggae	05. "Sit Down"
Cardi B	2018	Invasion of Privacy	04. "Bodak Yellow (Money Moves)"; 07. "I Like It" (with Bad Bunny and J Balvin); 09. "Money Bag"
Tinashe	2018	Joyride	05. "Ooh La La"
Stefflon Don	2018	Secure	10. "Crunch Time"
Messiah El Artista	2018	Non-album song	00. "Never Let You Go"
Cardi B	2018	Non-album song	00. "Money"
21 Savage	2018	I Am > I Was	01. "A Lot" (featuring J Cole)
Gucci Mane	2019	Delusions of Grandeur	01. "Bussdown"; 05. "Love Thru the Computer" (featuring Justin Bieber); 11. "Upgrade" (featuring Navé Monjo)
Iggy Azalea	2019	In My Defense	01. "Thanks I Get"; 02. "Clapback"; 03. "Sally Walker"; 04. "Hoemita" (featuring Lil Yachty); 05. "Started"; 06. "Spend It"; 07. "Fuck It Up" (featuring Kash Doll); 10. "Freak of the Week" (featuring Juicy J); 11. "Just Wanna"; 12. "Pussy Pop"
Gucci Mane	2019	Woptober II	02. "Big Booty" (featuring Megan Thee Stallion); 06. "Move Me"
Iggy Azalea	2019	Wicked Lips	01. "Lola" (with Alice Chater); 02. "Not Important"; 04. "Personal Problem"
Gucci Mane	2019	East Atlanta Santa 3	01. "Jingle Bales Intro"; 02. "Mr. Wop"; 03. "M's On Ice"; 04. "Drummer" (featuring Kranium); 07. "Dirty Dancer"; 08. "Snow"; 15. "12 Days of Christmas"
Megan Thee Stallion	2020	Suga	02. "Savage"
Flo Milli	2020	Ho, Why Is You Here?	"Like That B***h"; "Weak"
Latto	2020	Queen of da Souf	02. "Muwop"
Iggy Azalea	2021	The End of an Era	06. "Iam the Stripclub"
Drake and 21 Savage	2022	Her Loss	01. "Rich Flex" (Songwriting)
Doechii	2024	Non-album song	00. "What It Is (Block Boy)" (featuring Kodak Black)
