= Love Thru the Computer =

2019 single by Gucci Mane featuring Justin Bieber

Single by Gucci Mane featuring Justin Bieber

from the album Delusions of Grandeur
- Released: May 31, 2019
- Genre: Hip hop; trap
- Length: 2:52
- Label: Atlantic
- Songwriters: Radric Davis; Justin Bieber; Anthony White; Roger Troutman; Larry Troutman; Shirley Murdock
- Producer: J. White Did It

Gucci Mane singles chronology
"Shoebox" (2018)	"Love Thru the Computer" (2019)	"Backwards" (2019)

Justin Bieber singles chronology
"I Don't Care" (2019)	"Love Thru the Computer" (2019)	"Bad Guy" (2019)

"Love Thru the Computer" is a song by American rapper Gucci Mane, featuring Canadian singer Justin Bieber. It was released as the lead single from the former's thirteenth studio album, Delusions of Grandeur, on May 31, 2019. The song was written by the artists alongside producer J. White Did It, with additional writing credits going to Roger Troutman, Larry Troutman, and Shirley Murdock for the sampling of Zapp's "Computer Love".

== Background ==
"Love Thru the Computer" is a song in which Gucci Mane and Justin Bieber discuss the feeling of meeting their significant others online rather than in-person.

== Interpolation ==
It interpolates the 1980s hit "Computer Love" by the funk band Zapp with a few lines from the song as the background of the song along with the beat. Mane raps the first and third verses, while Bieber sings the chorus and the second verse.

== Personnel ==
Credits adapted from Tidal.

- Radric Davis – vocals, songwriting
- Justin Bieber – vocals, songwriting
- Anthony White – production, recording, vocal production, programming, songwriting
- Roger Troutman – songwriting
- Larry Troutman – songwriting
- Shirley Murdock – songwriting

== Release history ==
Country	Date	Format	Label	Ref.
Various	May 31, 2019	Digital download; streaming	Atlantic	
United States	May 31, 2019	Rhythmic contemporary radio	Atlantic	
