= Don't Call Me Angel =

2019 single by Ariana Grande, Miley Cyrus and Lana Del Rey

Single by Ariana Grande, Miley Cyrus and Lana Del Rey

from the album Charlie's Angels: Original Motion Picture Soundtrack
- Released: September 13, 2019
- Recorded: 2019
- Studio: MXM Studios (Los Angeles, CA); MXM Studios (Stockholm, Sweden); Shangri-La (Malibu, CA)
- Genre: Pop; trap
- Length: 3:10
- Label: Republic
- Songwriters: Miley Cyrus; Lana Del Rey; Ariana Grande; Savan Kotecha; Max Martin; Alma-Sofia Miettinen; Ilya Salmanzadeh
- Producers: Ilya; Max Martin

Ariana Grande singles chronology
"Boyfriend" (2019)	"Don't Call Me Angel" (2019)	"Good as Hell" (remix) (2019)

Miley Cyrus singles chronology
"Slide Away" (2019)	"Don't Call Me Angel" (2019)	"Midnight Sky" (2020)

Lana Del Rey singles chronology
"The Greatest" (2019)	"Don't Call Me Angel" (2019)	"Hallucinogenics" (2020)

Charlie's Angels singles chronology
"Feel Good Time" (2003)	"Don't Call Me Angel" (2019)	"How It's Done" (2019)

Music video
- "Don't Call Me Angel" on YouTube

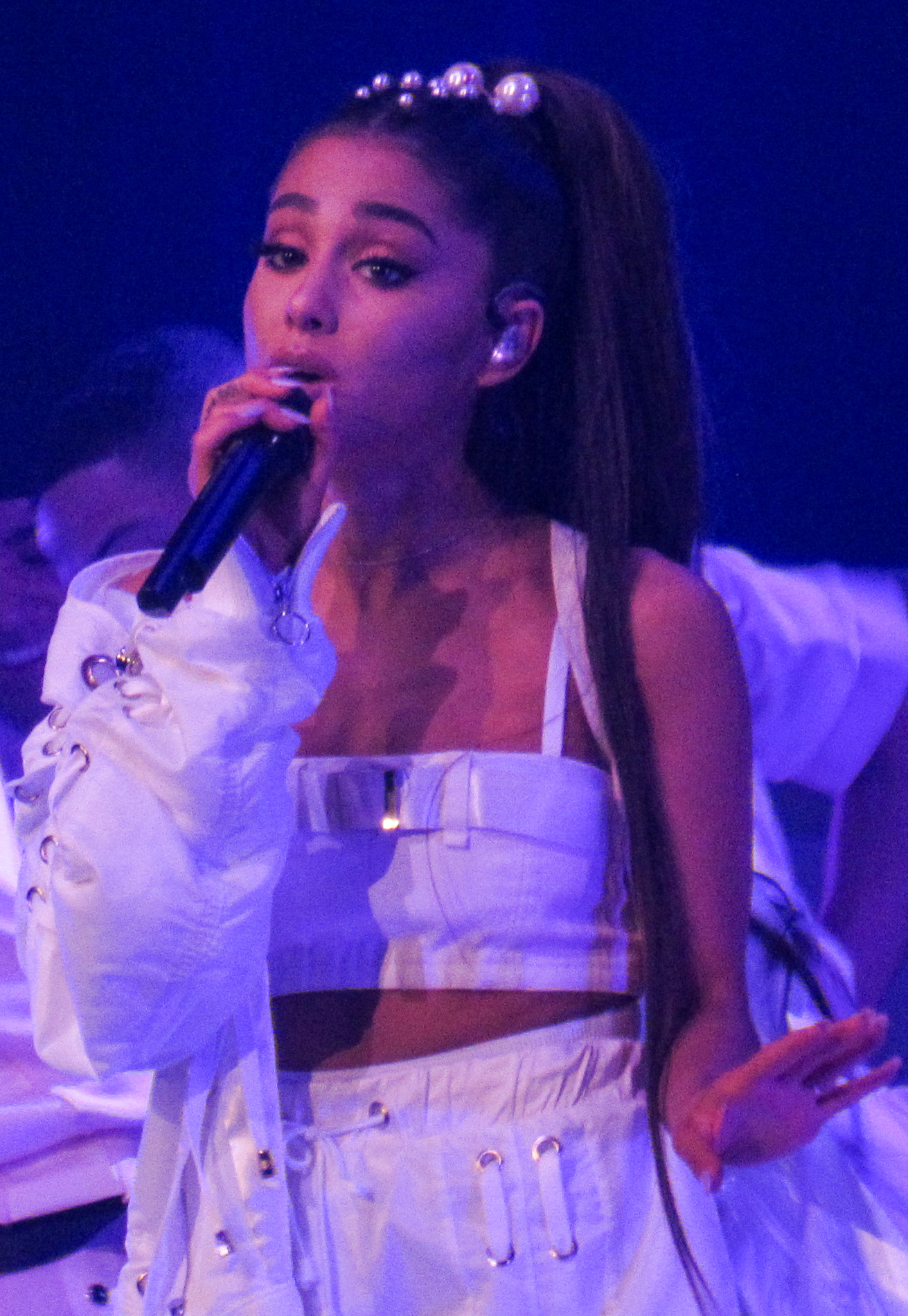
Ariana Grande

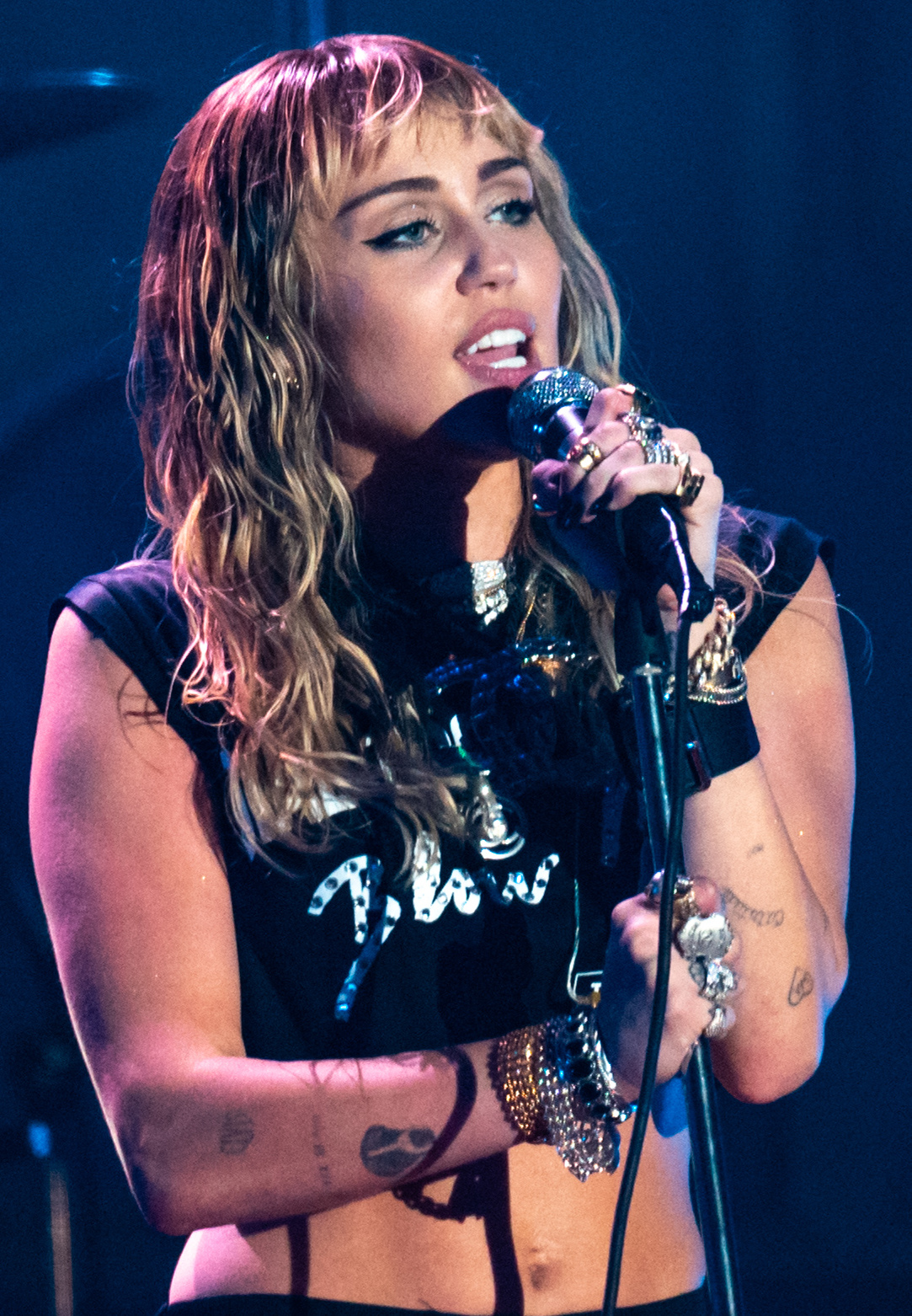
Miley Cyrus

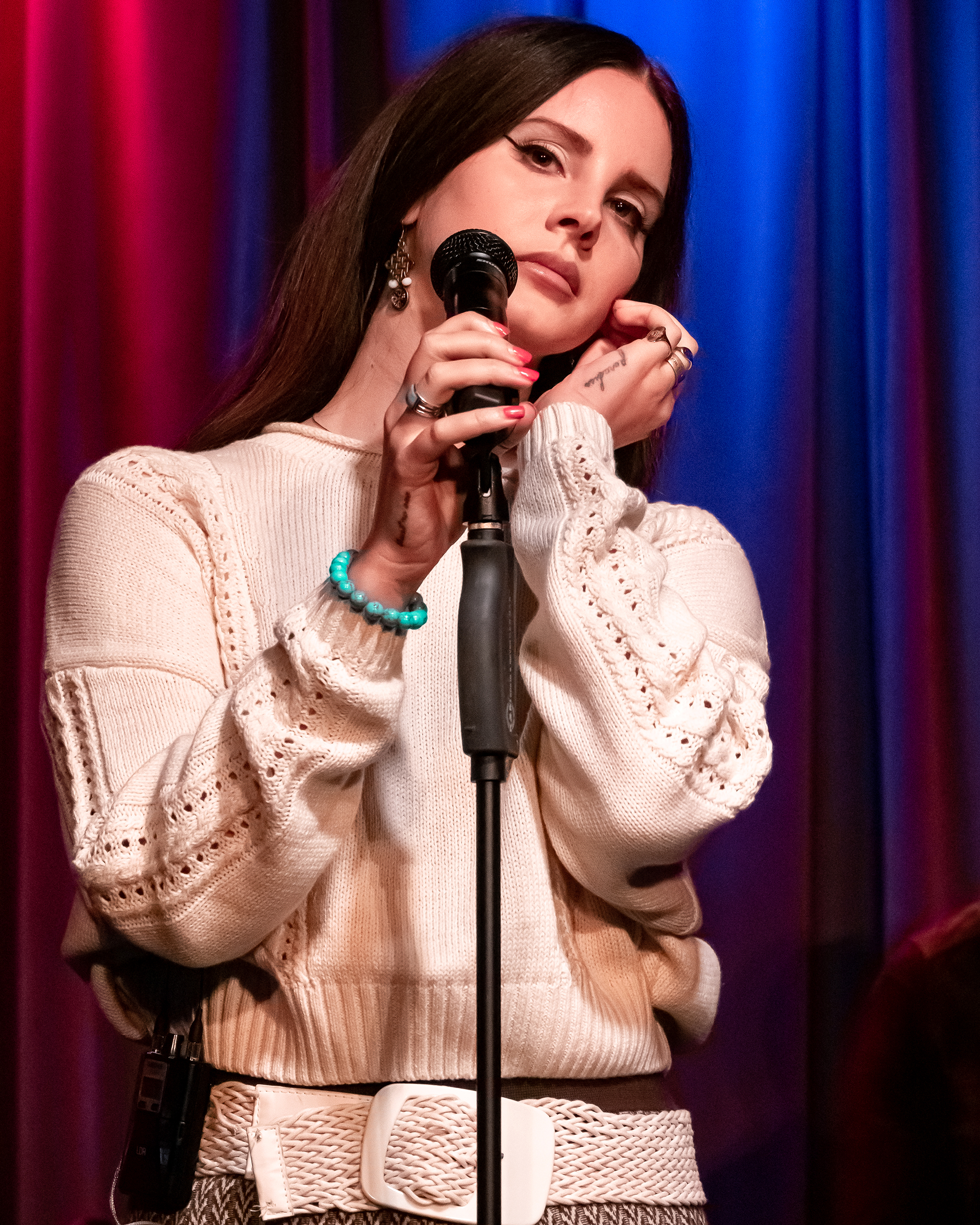
Lana Del Rey

"Don't Call Me Angel" is a song by American singers Ariana Grande, Miley Cyrus, and Lana Del Rey. It was released on September 13, 2019, by Republic Records as the lead single from the soundtrack to the film Charlie's Angels, based on the television series of the same name created by Ivan Goff and Ben Roberts. The song reached number one in Greece, Hungary, Iceland, Lebanon, Scotland and Israel, as well as the top five in eleven other countries.

== Background and composition ==
Grande, Cyrus, and Del Rey had collaborated on the theme song for the 2019 film Charlie's Angels. The song was written by Grande, Alma-Sofia Miettinen, Ilya Salmanzadeh, Del Rey, Max Martin, Cyrus and Savan Kotecha. "Don't Call Me Angel" is a pop and trap song with "lightly hip-hop-infused production".

== Critical reception ==
The song received a lukewarm reaction from critics. Vulture's Craig Jenkins wrote that the single "blends styles that sound fine alone but struggle to jell together ... such is the vastness of the space between the singers present". Stacey Anderson of Pitchfork stated that the pop stars "meet at a lower creative common denominator than they've enjoyed lately" while adding that the song has "distinct flatness". Writing for NME, Rhian Daly claimed it was "definitely not the follow-up to Destiny's Child's own Charlie's Angels theme" and that the collaboration was "far less potent".

== Commercial performance ==
"Don't Call Me Angel" debuted at number 13 on the Billboard Hot 100 chart becoming Grande's 20th top 20 song, Cyrus' 14th, and Del Rey's third. The song also became Del Rey's highest-charting song since "Summertime Sadness", which reached number six in 2013; as well as Cyrus' highest since "Malibu", which peaked at number 10 in 2017. The track started at number two on the Digital Songs chart with 26,000 downloads sold within its first week, and number eleven on the Streaming Songs chart with 26.3 million streams. With 7.5 million airplay audience impressions, "Don't Call Me Angel" also debuted at number 33 on the Mainstream Top 40 following a complete tracking week.

== Music video ==
The music video and the song were both released on September 13, 2019. It features the singers dressed up in black angel costumes and wearing wings on their backs. The ending featured Elizabeth Banks showcasing her role as Rebekah Bosley from the film. The video has since surpassed the 100 million view mark becoming Grande's first video since "7 Rings" to do so, Del Rey's first since "Lust for Life" and Cyrus' first since "Malibu".

=== Lyric video ===
A lyric video was released on September 16, 2019, which shows scenes from the film.

== Live performance ==
"Don't Call Me Angel" was first performed live by Cyrus during her set on iHeartRadio Music Festival on September 21, 2019.

== Credits and personnel ==
Credits adapted from Tidal:

- Ariana Grande – vocals, songwriting
- Miley Cyrus – vocals, songwriting
- Lana Del Rey – vocals, songwriting
- Ilya – production, songwriting, bass, drums, keyboards
- Max Martin – production, songwriting, bass, drums, keyboards
- Alma – songwriting
- Savan Kotecha – songwriting
- Daniel Changel – songwriting, samples
- Cory Bice – record engineering
- Jeremy Lertola – record engineering
- Sam Holland – record engineering
- John Hanes – mixing engineering
- Serban Ghenea – mixing

== Charts ==
=== Weekly charts ===
Weekly chart performance for "Don't Call Me Angel"
Chart (2019–2020)	Peak position
Argentina (Argentina Hot 100)	82
Australia (ARIA)	4
Austria (Ö3 Austria Top 40)	12
Belgium (Ultratop 50 Flanders)	28
Belgium (Ultratop 50 Wallonia)	23
Canada Hot 100 (Billboard)	7
Croatia (HRT)	17
Czech Republic Singles Digital (ČNS IFPI)	3
Denmark (Tracklisten)	22
Estonia (Eesti Ekspress)	4
Finland (Suomen virallinen lista)	9
France (SNEP)	64
Germany (GfK)	11
Greece International (IFPI Greece)	1
Hungary (Editors' Choice Top 40)	34
Hungary (Single Top 40)	1
Hungary (Stream Top 40)	2
Iceland (Tónlistinn)	1
Ireland (IRMA)	2
Italy (FIMI)	39
Israel (Galgalatz)	1
Israel (Media Forest)	1
Japan (Japan Hot 100)	61
Latvia (LAIPA)	3
Lebanon (OLT20 Combined Chart)	1
Lithuania (AGATA)	3
Luxembourg Digital Songs (Billboard)	3
Malaysia (RIM)	7
Netherlands (Dutch Top 40)	28
Netherlands (Single Top 100)	27
New Zealand (Recorded Music NZ)	6
Norway (VG-lista)	13
Poland Airplay (ZPAV)	74
Portugal (AFP)	8
Scottish Singles Sales (Official Charts)	1
Singapore (RIAS)	3
Slovakia Airplay (ČNS IFPI)	53
Slovakia Singles Digital (ČNS IFPI)	3
Spain (Promusicae)	28
Sweden (Sverigetopplistan)	25
Switzerland (Schweizer Hitparade)	4
UK Singles (Official Charts)	2
US Billboard Hot 100	13
US Adult Pop Airplay (Billboard)	37
US Dance Club Songs (Billboard)	38
US Pop Airplay (Billboard)	22
US Rolling Stone Top 100	7

=== Year-end charts ===
Year-end chart performance for "Don't Call Me Angel"
Chart (2019)	Position
Hungary (Single Top 40)	79
Hungary (Stream Top 40)	70

== Certifications ==
Certifications for "Don't Call Me Angel"
Region	Certification	Certified units/sales
Australia (ARIA)	Platinum	70,000^{‡}
Brazil (Pro-Música Brasil)	Diamond	160,000^{‡}
Canada (Music Canada)	Platinum	80,000^{‡}
New Zealand (RMNZ)	Gold	15,000^{‡}
Norway (IFPI Norway)	Gold	30,000^{‡}
Poland (ZPAV)	Platinum	20,000^{‡}
Portugal (AFP)	Gold	5,000^{‡}
United Kingdom (BPI)	Gold	400,000^{‡}
^{‡} Sales+streaming figures based on certification alone.

== Release history ==
Release dates and formats for "Don't Call Me Angel"
Region	Date	Format(s)	Label(s)	Ref.
Various	September 13, 2019	Digital download; streaming	Republic	
Australia	September 13, 2019	Radio airplay	Republic; Universal Australia	
Canada	September 13, 2019	Contemporary hit radio; hot adult contemporary radio	Republic	
Italy	September 13, 2019	Radio airplay	Universal	
United States	September 16, 2019	Adult contemporary radio; hot adult contemporary radio; modern adult contemporary radio	Republic	
United States	September 17, 2019	Contemporary hit radio	Republic	
United States	January 2020	7-inch vinyl; 12-inch vinyl; cassette; CD	Republic	
