= Delusions of Grandeur (Gucci Mane album) =

Studio album by Gucci Mane
- Released: June 21, 2019
- Genres: Hip-hop; trap
- Length: 57:53
- Labels: GUWOP; Atlantic
- Producers: Cubeatz; Hector Chaparro; Hitmaka; J. White Did It; Kenny Beats; MariiBeatz; mjNichols; Murda Beatz; Nils; OG Parker; P.Kaldone; Pvlace; Ricky Racks; Rockin Wit Slime; Romano; Seph Got The Waves; Six7; Smash David; Sool Got Hits; Southside; Tay Keith; Turbo; Zaytoven

Gucci Mane chronology
Evil Genius (2018)	Delusions of Grandeur (2019)	Woptober II (2019)

Singles from Delusions of Grandeur
- 1. "Love Thru the Computer" Released: May 31, 2019; 2. "Backwards" Released: June 13, 2019; 3. "Proud of You" Released: June 18, 2019

Delusions of Grandeur is the thirteenth studio album by American rapper Gucci Mane. It was released on June 21, 2019, by Atlantic Records and GUWOP Enterprises. The album features guest appearances from Meek Mill, Gunna, Lil Baby, Justin Bieber, Jeremih, A Boogie wit da Hoodie, Wiz Khalifa, Rick Ross, Lil Uzi Vert, Young Dolph, Anuel AA, and Peewee Longway, among others.

Professional ratings
Review scores
Source	Rating
AllMusic	3.5/5 stars

The album is supported by three singles: "Love Thru the Computer" featuring Justin Bieber, "Backwards" featuring Meek Mill and "Proud of You". Delusions of Grandeur debuted at number seven on the US Billboard 200 selling 32,000 equivalent copies (3,000 in pure album sales).

== Background ==
During an appearance on Beats 1 on June 13, 2019, Gucci Mane announced the title of his studio album. In addition, he anticipated the album by stating: "it's going to surprise a lot of people, man, because [it's] a crazy album."

== Promotion ==
The album's lead single, "Love Thru the Computer" featuring Justin Bieber was released on May 31, 2019.

The second single "Backwards" featuring Meek Mill premiered on Beats 1 on June 13, 2019. Its music video premiered on June 17, 2019.

Followed by the third single, "Proud of You" on June 18, 2019, alongside its music video that was directed by DreVinci WRKS released on the day after.

== Track listing ==
No.	Title	Writer(s)	Producer(s)	Length
1.	"Bussdown"	Radric Davis; Anthony White	J. White Did It	3:06
2.	"Backwards" (featuring Meek Mill)	Davis; Robert Williams; Xavier Dotson	Zaytoven	2:57
3.	"Special" (with Anuel AA)	Davis; Emmanuel Santiago; Shane Lindstrom; Kevin Gomringer; Tim Gomringer	Murda Beatz; Cubeatz	4:03
4.	"ICE" (featuring Gunna and Lil Baby)	Davis; Sergio Kitchens; Dominique Jones; London Holmes	London on da Track; Hector Chaparro^{[a]}; Rockin Wit Slime^{[a]}	2:57
5.	"Love Thru the Computer" (featuring Justin Bieber)	Davis; Justin Bieber; White; Roger Troutman; Larry Troutman; Shirley Murdock	J. White Did It	2:52
6.	"Proud of You"	Davis; Kenneth Blume; Nils Noehden	Kenny Beats; Nils	2:32
7.	"Bottom"	Davis; Brytavious Chambers	Tay Keith	3:25
8.	"Hands Off" (featuring Jeremih)	Radric Davis; Jeremy Felton; Christian Ward; Samuel Jimenez; Joshua Parker; Terrence Williams; Jordan Holt-May	Hitmaka; OG Parker; Romano; Smash David	2:35
9.	"Blind" (featuring A Boogie wit da Hoodie)	Davis; Artist Dubose; Dotson	Zaytoven	3:33
10.	"Superstar"	Davis; Patrick Joseph; Jamarii Massey	MariiBeatz; Six7^{[a]}; P.Kaldone^{[a]}; Seph Got The Waves^{[a]}	3:12
11.	"Upgrade" (featuring Navé Monjo)	Davis; Evan Hancock; White	J. White Did It	3:24
12.	"Lame" (featuring Wiz Khalifa and Rick Ross)	Davis; Cameron Thomaz; William Roberts II; Joshua Luellen; Denis Berger	Southside; Pvlace	4:02
13.	"Potential" (featuring Lil Uzi Vert and Young Dolph)	Davis; Symere Woods; Adolph Thornton; Ricky Harrell, Jr.	Ricky Racks; Nichols^{[a]}	4:50
14.	"Human Chandelier"	Davis; Massey; Daremey Steptoe	MariiBeatz; Six7	2:38
15.	"US"	Davis; Blume	Kenny Beats	2:33
16.	"Look at Me Now"	Davis; Chambers	Tay Keith	2:53
17.	"Making of a Murderer"	Davis; Lindstrom	Murda Beatz; Sool Got Hits^{[a]}	2:46
18.	"Outro" (featuring DJ Drama and Peewee Longway)	Davis; Quincy; Carlton Mays, Jr.	Honorable C.N.O.T.E.	3:35
Total length:				57:53

Notes

- ^{^[a]} signifies an uncredited co-producer
- "Ice" is stylized as "ICE"
- "Us" is stylized as "US"

Sample credits

- "Love Thru the Computer" contains a sample from "Computer Love", written by Roger Troutman, Larry Troutman, and Shirley Murdock, as performed by Zapp & Roger.

== Personnel ==
- Amani Hernández – mixing (tracks 1–3, 6, 7, 11–13, 15), engineering assistant (track 4)
- Josh Gudwin – mixing (track 5)
- DJ Riggins – mixing (track 8)
- Jacob Richards – mixing (track 8)
- Jaycen Joshua – mixing (track 8)
- Mike Seaberg – mixing (track 8)
- Max Deak – mixing (tracks 10, 14, 16)
- Colin Leonard – mastering (all tracks)
- Eddie "eMIX" Hernandez – engineering (tracks 1–3, 5–12, 15–17), mixing (tracks 1–4, 6, 7, 9–18)
- Anthony Cruz – engineering (track 2)
- Salvador Majail – engineering (tracks 10, 14)
- Sean Paine – engineering (track 13)

== Charts ==
Chart (2019)	Peak position
Australian Albums (ARIA)	82
Canadian Albums (Billboard)	18
Dutch Albums (Album Top 100)	60
French Albums (SNEP)	148
Swiss Albums (Schweizer Hitparade)	94
US Billboard 200	7
