= Charlie's Angels: Original Motion Picture Soundtrack =

2019 soundtrack by various artists

Soundtrack album by various artists
- Released: November 1, 2019
- Recorded: 2019
- Genre: Pop
- Length: 36:37
- Language: English; Portuguese
- Label: Republic
- Producer: Savan Kotecha; Ariana Grande; Max Martin; Ilya; Spring Aspers; Wendy Goldstein; Dana Sano; Jennifer Beal; Cara Walker

Charlie's Angels soundtracks chronology
Charlie's Angels: Full Throttle (2003)	Charlie's Angels: Original Motion Picture Soundtrack (2019)

Singles from Charlie's Angels
- 1. "Don't Call Me Angel" Released: September 13, 2019; 2. "How It's Done" Released: October 11, 2019; 3. "Pantera" Released: October 23, 2019

Professional ratings
Review scores
Source	Rating
Pitchfork	5.4/10

Charlie's Angels: Original Motion Picture Soundtrack is the soundtrack to the film Charlie's Angels, based on the television series of the same name created by Ivan Goff and Ben Roberts. It was released through Republic Records on November 1, 2019, and was executive produced by Ariana Grande and Savan Kotecha. The lead single, "Don't Call Me Angel", by Grande, Miley Cyrus and Lana Del Rey, was released on September 13. The soundtrack's second single, "How It's Done", by Kash Doll, Kim Petras, Alma and Stefflon Don, was released on October 11 with the album's pre-order. The soundtrack also features contributions from Normani, Nicki Minaj, Anitta, Chaka Khan, Victoria Monét, and Tayla Parx.

== Track listing ==
Credits adapted from Apple Music, Spotify, and Tidal.

No.	Title	Writer(s)	Producer(s)	Length
1.	"How It's Done" (Kash Doll, Kim Petras, Alma and Stefflon Don)	Alma; Ariana Grande; Kash Doll; Stefflon Don; Ilya Salmanzadeh; Savan Kotecha; Rami Yacoub	Ilya; Kotecha; Yacoub^{[a]}; Aaron Joseph^{[b]}	3:01
2.	"Bad to You" (Ariana Grande, Normani and Nicki Minaj)	Grande; Onika Maraj; Brandon "Bizzy" Hollemon; Ilya; Max Martin; Kotecha; Danny Schofield	Martin; Ilya; Kuk Harrell^{[b]}; Grande^{[D]}	2:52
3.	"Don't Call Me Angel" (Ariana Grande, Miley Cyrus and Lana Del Rey)	Grande; Del Rey; Cyrus; Alma; Ilya; Martin; Kotecha	Martin; Ilya; Grande^{[D]}	3:10
4.	"Eyes Off You" (M-22, Arlissa and Kiana Ledé)	Adrien Nookadu; Andre Nookadu; Arlissa; Matthew Humphrey; Frank Buelles	M-22	3:23
5.	"Bad Girls (Gigamesh Remix)" (Donna Summer)	Summer; Bruce Sudano; Edward "Eddie" Hokenson; Joe "Bean" Esposito	Giorgio Moroder; Pete Bellotte; Gigamesh^{[c]}	5:21
6.	"Nobody" (Ariana Grande and Chaka Khan)	Grande; Kotecha; Ilya; Martin	Ilya; Martin; Kotecha^{[b]}; Peter Karlsson^{[b]}; Grande^{[D]}	3:00
7.	"Pantera" (Anitta)	Anitta; Alyssa Lourdiz Cantu; Andrés Torres; Elof Loelv; Mauricio Rengifo; Pablo Christian Fuentes; Umberto Tavares	Loelv; Torres^{[a]}; Rengifo^{[a]}	2:05
8.	"How I Look on You" (Ariana Grande)	Grande; Kotecha; Ilya; Martin	Ilya; Martin; Grande^{[D]}	2:54
9.	"Blackout" (Danielle Bradbery)	Jonathan Perkins; Nikki Williams	Perkins	3:22
10.	"Got Her Own" (Ariana Grande and Victoria Monét)	Grande; Monét; Mr. Franks; Tommy Brown; Travis Sayles; Tayla Parx	Mr. Franks; Brown; Sayles; Grande^{[D]}	2:42
11.	"Charlie's Angels Theme (Black Caviar Remix)" (Allyn Ferguson, Black Caviar and Jack Elliott)	Elliott; Ferguson	Elliott; Ferguson	2:45
Total length:				34:36

=== Notes ===
- ^{^[a]} signifies a co-producer
- ^{^[b]} signifies a vocal producer
- ^{^[c]} signifies a remixer
- ^{^[D]} signifies an additional producer

== Personnel ==
Credits adapted from AllMusic.

=== Performers and vocals ===
- Kash Doll – vocals (track 1)
- Kim Petras – vocals (track 1)
- Alma – vocals (track 1)
- Stefflon Don – vocals (track 1)
- Ariana Grande – vocals (tracks 2–3, 6, 8, 10)
- Nicki Minaj – vocals (track 2)
- Normani – vocals (track 2)
- Miley Cyrus – vocals (track 3)
- Lana Del Rey – vocals (track 3)
- M-22 – vocals (track 4)
- Arlissa – vocals (track 4)
- Kiana Ledé – vocals (track 4)
- Donna Summer – vocals (track 5)
- Chaka Khan – vocals (track 6)
- Anitta – vocals (track 7)
- Danielle Bradbery – vocals, background vocals (track 9)
- Victoria Monét – vocals (track 10)
- Rami Yacoub – background vocals (track 1)
- ILYA – background vocals (tracks 1–2, 6)
- Savan Kotecha – background vocals (tracks 1–2, 6)
- Matthew Humphrey – background vocals (track 4)
- Frank Sanders – background vocals (track 4)
- Max Martin – background vocals (track 6)
- Lourdiz – background vocals (track 7)
- Madeleine van der Veer – background vocals (track 7)
- Nikki Williams – background vocals (track 9)
- Jordan "DJ Swivel" Young – background vocals (track 9)

=== Instrumentation ===
- Rami Yacoub – keys, bass, percussion, strings & horns arranging (track 1)
- ILYA – keys, bass (tracks 1–3, 6, 8), percussion (tracks 1–2, 6, 8), drums (tracks 3, 6, 8), guitar (tracks 6, 8)
- Michael Engstrom – bass (track 1)
- Mattias Johansson – violin (track 1)
- David Bukovinszky – cello (track 1)
- Mattias Bylund – string synthesizer, strings & horns arranging, strings & horns recording & editing (track 1), synthesizer horns (tracks 1, 6), horns recording & editing (track 6)
- Magnus Johansson – trumpet (tracks 1, 6)
- Janne Bjerger – trumpet (tracks 1, 6)
- Wojtek Goral – alto sax (tracks 1, 6), tenor sax, baritone sax (track 1)
- Tomas Jonsson – tenor sax (tracks 1, 6), baritone sax (track 6)
- Peter Noos Johansson – trombone (tracks 1, 6)
- Bizzy – guitar, bass (track 2)
- Max Martin – keys, bass (tracks 2–3, 6, 8), percussion (tracks 2, 6, 8), drums (tracks 3, 6, 8), guitar (tracks 6, 8)
- DannyBoyStyles – keys, bass, percussion (track 2)
- Matthew Humphrey – keys, drums (track 4)
- Frank Sanders – keys, drums (track 4)
- The Horn Guys – horns arranging (track 6)
- Elof Loelv – keys, bass, drums, synthesizer, guitar (track 7)
- Andrés Torres – guitar (track 7)
- Jordan "DJ Swivel" Young – additional drum programming (track 9)
- Jonathan Perkins – keys, bass (track 9)
- Black Caviar – keys, guitar, bass, percussion (track 11)

=== Production ===
- ILYA – production (tracks 1–3, 6, 8), vocal production (tracks 1–2, 6)
- Rami Yacoub – production (track 1)
- Savan Kotecha – co-production (track 1), Chaka Khan vocals production (track 6)
- Aaron Joseph – Kim Petras vocals production (track 1)
- Max Martin – production (tracks 2–3, 6, 8), vocal production (tracks 2, 6)
- Kuk Harrell – Normani vocals production (track 2)
- M-22 – production (track 4)
- Giorgio Moroder – production (track 5)
- Pete Bellotte – production (track 5)
- Gigamesh – remix production (track 5)
- Peter Karlsson – Chaka Khan vocals production (track 6)
- Elof Loelv – production (track 7)
- Andrés Torres – co-production (track 7)
- Mauricio Rengifo – co-production (track 7)
- Jonathan Perkins – production (track 9)
- Tommy Brown – production (track 10)
- Mr. Franks – production (track 10)
- Travis Sayles – production (track 10)
- Jack Elliott – production (track 11)
- Allyn Ferguson – production (track 11)

=== Technical ===
- Serban Ghenea – mixing (tracks 1–3, 6–8, 10)
- Sam Holland – engineering (tracks 1–3, 6, 8)
- Cory Bice – engineering (tracks 1–3, 6, 8)
- Jeremy Lertola – engineering (tracks 1–3, 6, 8)
- Parker Ament – Kash Doll vocals engineering (track 1)
- Aaron Joseph – Kim Petras vocals engineering (track 1)
- Rymez – Stefflon Don vocals engineering (track 1)
- Kalle Keskikuru – Alma vocals engineering (track 1)
- John Hanes – mix engineering (tracks 1–3, 6–8, 10)
- ILYA – programming (tracks 1–3, 6, 8), arrangement (track 3, 8)
- Rami Yacoub – programming (track 1)
- Kuk Harrell – Normani vocals engineering (track 2)
- Simone Torres – Normani vocals engineering (track 2)
- Aubry "Big Juice" Delaine – Nicki Minaj vocals engineering (track 2)
- Max Martin – programming (tracks 2–3, 6, 8), arrangement (tracks 3, 8)
- DannyBoyStyles – programming (track 2)
- Matthew Humphrey – mixing, programming (track 4)
- Frank Sanders – mixing, programming (track 4)
- Tim Horner – mix engineering (track 4)
- Todd Cooper – mix engineering (track 4)
- Jürgen Koppers – recording, mix engineer (track 5)
- Steven D. Smith – recording (track 5)
- Peter Karlsson – Chaka Khan vocals recording (track 6)
- Savan Kotecha – Chaka Khan vocals recording (track 6)
- Elof Loelv – programming (track 7)
- Jordan "DJ Swivel" Young – mixing (track 9)
- Harry Chapin – mix assistant (track 9)
- Jonathan Perkins – engineering, programming (track 9)
- Zaq Reynolds – additional engineering (track 9)
- Tommy Brown – recording, programming (track 10)
- Billy Hickey – recording (track 10)
- Mr. Franks – programming (track 10)
- Travis Sayles – programming (track 10)
- Black Caviar – mix engineering, programming (track 11)

=== Artwork ===
- Ryan Rogers – art direction
- Jacob Lerman – package design

== Charts ==
Weekly chart performance for Charlie's Angels: Original Motion Picture Soundtrack
Chart (2019)	Peak position
Australian Albums (ARIA)	58
Belgian Albums (Ultratop Flanders)	113
Canadian Albums (Billboard)	31
Dutch Albums (Album Top 100)	56
Finnish Albums (Suomen virallinen lista)	18
Italian Compilation Albums (FIMI)	3
Norwegian Albums (VG-lista)	14
UK Soundtrack Albums (OCC)	10
US Billboard 200	38
US Soundtrack Albums (Billboard)	2
