= Lola (Iggy Azalea song) =

Single by Iggy Azalea and Alice Chater

from the EP Wicked Lips and Aries
- Released: 8 November 2019
- Genre: Hip hop; trap
- Length: 3:52
- Label: Bad Dreams; Empire
- Songwriters: Amethyst Kelly; Alice Chater; Kee Ingrosso
- Producers: Carl Falk; J. White Did It

Iggy Azalea singles chronology
| "Fuck It Up" (2019) | "Lola" (2019) | "Dance Like Nobody's Watching" (2020) |

Alice Chater singles chronology
| "Got It All" (2019) | "Lola" (2019) | "Two of Us" (2020) |

Music video
- "Lola" on YouTube

"Lola" is a song by Australian rapper Iggy Azalea, released as the lead single from her fifth extended play Wicked Lips (2019). The song is a collaboration with British singer Alice Chater, and is included in her 2020 extended play Aries. It was released by Bad Dreams Records (a record label owned by Azalea herself) and Empire Distribution on 8 November 2019. The song contains a sample of "Mambo Italiano".

Azalea and Chater performed the song live for the first time at the International Music Awards in Berlin, Germany on 22 November 2019.

== Background and composition ==
Following the release of her long-delayed second studio album in mid-2019, Azalea announced shortly after its release that she would not tour to promote it and would instead work on recording new music. After teasing collaborations with Brooke Candy and Pabllo Vittar, Azalea tweeted a photo of her and British singer and dancer Alice Chater in the studio working on a new song. Eventually she revealed the title alongside its cover art in late-October 2019, a week before the official release on 7 November.

The song was written by Chater, Azalea, A. Cygnaues, D. Gavin, Dhani Lennevald, and Kee Ingrosso and produced by Carl Falk and J. White Did It.

The song samples Dean Martin's "Mambo Italiano" and references Ricky Martin's "Livin' La Vida Loca" as well. The lyrics reference Azalea's time in a mental institution during 2018.

== Promotion and release ==
After teasing the song for several weeks on Twitter, the song was officially released on 8 November 2019. "Lola" was serviced to US pop and rhythmic radio stations the day of its release, with an accompanying music video being released the same day as well. The song was also featured on Spotify's Rhythmic and Viral 50 playlists.

The duo performed the song live for the first time at the International Music Awards in Berlin, Germany on 22 November 2019.

== Music video ==
Released in November 2019, the video has surpassed over 45 million views as of January 2025.

=== Background ===
A music video for the song was released to YouTube on the same day as the single's release. On Twitter, Azalea stated "Lola" was her biggest production to date. Thom Kerr and Azalea directed the music video. Azalea said on Twitter that she co-directs and co-edits all her videos on Adobe Premiere Pro.

A behind-the-scenes video was uploaded to YouTube documenting the creative process. The video features eight costume changes for the two singers.

=== Synopsis and reception ===
The video takes place inside an insane asylum named Celestial Heights Insane Asylum for Wicked Lips and Devilish Women. It begins as three older nurses (one which is played by Thelma Gudmunds) roll a cart of pills down to the hospital room in which Azalea and Chater are sharing. Once they take their medications, they slip into a trance during which they dance and sing their way through multiple sets.

The first setting shows the nurses in leopard print nurse outfits while Azalea and Chater dance in a gratified room, followed by the duo trying to escape the nurses while dancing down a hallway. After the nurses detain Azalea and Chater, the camera pans to a photo on the wall where it then shows Azalea and Chater dancing in a blood orange-colored padded safety room while wearing fashionable green straight-jackets. Azalea and Chater are then seen in a hyper colored room that has two bathtubs filled with pills. They then are in a pink floral printed bathroom as the duo shave. After, Azalea and Chater have a synchronized dance breakdown in a new room with the nurses while in matching outfits. Before Azalea and Chater come out of their hallucinations, they are shown in bathtubs filled with pills. The video is edited to feature psychedelic effects during this segment to emphasize their drug-induced trance. Once the scene ends, Azalea and Chater come to and embark on psychotic frenzies in front of the nurses. As Chater belts out her high note, the two girls fall onto their bed, ending their episode and arriving at the conclusion of the video.

Daniel Megarry of The Gay Times called it "the best video of the year".

== Critical reception ==
Uproxx listed "Lola" as one of the best pop songs of the week. In a negative review, Daniel Spielberger of HipHopDX wrote that the track "sounds like if Camila Cabello's 'Havana' and Cardi B's 'I Like It' were thrown into a broken blender. Azalea is far from a subtle thief. She can't be bothered to try to disguise the flow and style of Cardi B's superior 'I Like It' verse."

== Charts ==
| Chart (2019–2020) | Peak position |
|---|---|
| Belgium (Ultratip Bubbling Under Wallonia) | 31 |
| Belgium Urban (Ultratop Flanders) | 45 |
| New Zealand Hot Singles (RMNZ) | 28 |
| Scottish Singles Sales (Official Charts) | 76 |
| UK Singles Downloads (Official Charts) | 84 |
| US Rap Digital Song Sales (Billboard) | 9 |

== Release history ==
| Region | Date | Format | Label | Ref. |
|---|---|---|---|---|
| Various | 8 November 2019 | Digital download; streaming | Bad Dreams; Empire | |
| United States | 3 December 2019 | Top 40 radio | Bad Dreams; Empire | |
| United States | 3 December 2019 | Rhythmic contemporary | Bad Dreams; Empire | |
