= Wicked Lips =

EP by Iggy Azalea
- Released: 2 December 2019
- Recorded: September–November 2019
- Genre: Pop, hip hop
- Length: 13:20
- Label: Bad Dreams; Empire
- Producer: Carl Falk; J. White Did It

Iggy Azalea chronology
In My Defense (2019)	Wicked Lips (2019)	The End of an Era (2021)

Singles from Wicked Lips
- 1. "Lola" Released: 8 November 2019

Wicked Lips is the fifth and final extended play by Australian rapper Iggy Azalea, released on 2 December 2019 through Bad Dreams Records and Empire. Although it was initially announced to be a reissue of Azalea's second studio album In My Defense, it was revealed through the rapper's Twitter that her next musical project would be an extended play.

The extended play is supported by the lead single, "Lola", with British singer Alice Chater. Many delays happened within the EP's release with it being scheduled for release on 15 November, then on 22 November, but then it got delayed again until its eventual release on 2 December.

== Background and release ==
After releasing her second studio album In My Defense on 19 July 2019 which peaked at number 50 on the US Billboard 200, Azalea stated that she would not be touring for the album and instead would be working on new music. She then announced the release of the extended play along with the release of the lead single "Lola" released on 8 November 2019. The extended play was set for release on 15 November 2019 but would be delayed two times for unknown reasons, before being officially released on 2 December 2019.

== Singles ==
"Lola" featuring Alice Chater was released on 8 November 2019 and was sent to rhythmic and contemporary hit radio as the lead single on 3 December 2019. The single peaked at number 9 on the US Rap Digital Songs Sales Chart and number 84 on the UK Download Chart.

== Critical reception ==
Professional ratings
Review scores
Source	Rating
HipHopDX	2.4/5 stars

The album generally received mixed reviews, Mike Nied of Idolator points out that, "from start to finish, Wicked Lips is more proof that Iggy is doing things her own way. And that’s a very good thing. While 'Lola' is clearly the standout, every other track is a testament to her confidence and ability to craft bops." Daniel Spielberger of HipHopDX notices that "Azalea goes for a new approach: instead of getting bogged down by her past controversies, she dips her toes into various genres to see if she can regain her commercial mojo. But ultimately, the songs on Wicked Lips sound like skeletal homages to other artists' more interesting work" and concludes that, "though it's a slight improvement from her second album, Wicked Lips still shows that Azalea can't find her own lane. This EP has her settling for mediocrity and resting comfortably in the discount bin."

== Track listing ==
Adapted from Apple Music.

No.	Title	Writer(s)	Producer(s)	Length
1.	"Lola" (with Alice Chater)	Chater; Amanda Cygnaeus; Amethyst Kelly; Drew Gavin; Dhani Lennevald; Kee Ingrosso	Carl Falk	3:52
2.	"Not Important"	Kelly; Gavin	J. White Did It	2:28
3.	"The Girls" (with Pabllo Vittar)	Kelly; Gavin; James Alan; Noah Cyrus	Falk	4:14
4.	"Personal Problem"	Kelly; Gavin	J. White Did It	2:46
Total length:				13:20

== Personnel ==
- Iggy Azalea – lead vocals
- Alice Chater – co-lead vocals (track 1)
- Pabllo Vittar – co-lead vocals (track 3)

== Charts ==
Chart (2019)	Peak position
US R&B/Hip-Hop Album Sales (Billboard)	42

== Release history ==
Region	Date	Format(s)	Label	Ref.
Various	2 December 2019	Digital download; streaming; LP; CD; Tape	Bad Dreams; Empire	
