= In My Defense =

Studio album by Iggy Azalea
- Released: 19 July 2019
- Recorded: 2018–2019
- Genre: Hip-hop
- Length: 35:32
- Labels: Bad Dreams; Empire
- Producers: J. White Did It; Go Grizzly; Smash David; Rico Beats

Iggy Azalea chronology
Survive the Summer (2018)	In My Defense (2019)	Wicked Lips (2019)

Singles from In My Defense
- 1. "Sally Walker" Released: 15 March 2019; 2. "Started" Released: 3 May 2019; 3. "Fuck It Up" Released: 19 July 2019

In My Defense is the second studio album by Australian rapper Iggy Azalea. It was released independently on 19 July 2019 by Azalea's label Bad Dreams Records and Empire Distribution, serving as the follow-up to The New Classic (2014). The album contains features from Lil Yachty, Kash Doll, Juicy J, and Iggy's protégée Stini, with production including J. White Did It, who executive produced the album with handling production on majority of its tracks, as well as with Smash David, Go Grizzly and Rico Beats.

In My Defense was preceded by three singles. "Sally Walker", released on 15 March 2019, debuted and peaked at number 62 on the Billboard Hot 100. "Started" was released as the second single on 3 May 2019. "Fuck It Up" featuring American rapper Kash Doll was released as the third and final single on the day of the album's release.

The album debuted at number 50 on the US Billboard 200 and number 6 on the Independent Albums chart selling 11,261 album equivalent units in its first week. The album received generally negative reviews from music critics.

== Background ==
In early 2016, Azalea released "Team", the intended lead single from her second studio album, then titled Digital Distortion. Several other songs were released throughout 2016, 2017 and 2018, including the singles "Mo Bounce", "Switch" and "Savior". In late 2017, Azalea announced that the album had been shelved completely because of her ex-fiancé basketball player Nick Young cheating on her and she was working on a new record. Shortly afterwards, it was announced that she had signed to Island Records. In mid-2018, Azalea released the extended play Survive the Summer, which includes the RIAA-certified single, "Kream", featuring Tyga. Several months after the EP's release, Azalea announced she had left Island Records and had become an independent unsigned artist.

In August 2018, Azalea expressed her anticipation to record her album on Twitter. In November, Azalea signed a multi-million dollar distribution deal with Empire after her departure from Island Records. In February 2019, Azalea announced the first single release, "Sally Walker". The single was released on 15 March 2019. The second single "Started" was released along with its music video on 3 May 2019. Azalea also teased an upcoming collaboration with Brazilian drag queen Pabllo Vittar on Twitter. On 28 June 2019, "Just Wanna" was released as a promotional single along with the album pre-order.

== Singles ==
"Sally Walker" was released on March 15, 2019, as the lead single for the album. The single would experience moderate success, reaching number 62 on the Billboard Hot 100 and number 27 on the US Rhythmic Chart, marking Iggy's first appearance on both charts, since her single "Kream" in 2018. The song was also performed in Las Vegas, Nevada on the Jimmy Kimmel Live! Show. The music video was released the same day as the single's release and featured a cameo from YouTuber James Charles.

The second single "Started" was released on May 3, 2019, and reached number 20 on the Songs Bubbling Under Hot 100 and 76 on UK Singles Chart. Its music video was released the same day. On August 10, 2021, the RIAA certified its sales with a Gold plaque after selling 500,000 units in the United States.

"Fuck It Up" featuring rapper Kash Doll was released on July 19, 2019, as the third and final single and reached number 40 on the New Zealand Hot Singles Chart.

"Just Wanna" was released as the only promotional single on June 28, 2019, alongside the album's pre-order.

== Critical reception ==
Professional ratings
Aggregate scores
Source	Rating
Metacritic	39/100
Review scores
Source	Rating
AllMusic	1.5/5 stars
Clash	5/10
HipHopDX	2.5/5 stars
Idolator	4/5 stars
Pitchfork	3.8/10
New Zealand Herald	1/5 stars
Tom Hull – on the Web	B+

In My Defense was met with negative reviews from music critics, Aggerator Metacritic the album received an average score of 39 out of 100, based on four reviews, indicating "generally unfavourable reviews".

AllMusic's Neil Z. Yeung said that on the album Azalea "continues bragging, boasting, and fronting without any depth or sounding pleasure". In a negative review, Pitchfork's Dani Blum wrote "The album is stacked with cartoonish approximations of what she thinks a rap song should sound like: shivers of bass, the occasional 'skrrrt,' Mad Libs of designer brands and bodily fluids. Many sound like direct imitations of the rappers she admires," and critiques the album as a whole to be "Iggy cram[ming] her songs with one-liners that sound like branded Instagram captions". He praised "Sally Walker" as the best song on the album, while "Freak of the Week" was described as "a rejected track by Megan Thee Stallion". Siena Yates of New Zealand Herald said that the album "half these songs feature a good 30 seconds of Iggy just repeating the title over and over, and none of them particularly stand out".

Mike Neid of Idolator stated "It's raucous and unrepentant fun. A comedown would only provide a little more depth." Craig Jenkins of Vulture stated "In My Defense is a funny follow-up to the frustrations of the Digital Distortion era because the title and cover art are ruses... It's an improvement over last year's EP [Survive the Summer]. Iggy Azalea seems to be in control of her career for the first time in a long time. Not everyone in the game can say the same." Nicolas Tyrell of Clash magazine praised her overall improvement, "Azalea has improved in both her flow and story-telling in her time away from the mainstream", but noted the album as a whole is "delivered as a project that she thinks that we want to hear, as opposed to what is truly on her mind". Tom Hull applauded the rapper for "doubl[ing] down on her hard edge here".

== Commercial performance ==
In the US, In My Defense debuted at number 50 on the US Billboard 200 with 11,261 album-equivalent units, including 5,779 pure album sales and a streaming count of 6.67 million. This marks Azalea's fourth appearance on the chart. The album would also land on the US Independent Albums chart at number 6 and number 25 on the US Top R&B/Hip Hop Albums chart.

The album would peak at number 52 and 18 on the Australian Albums and Australian Urban Albums chart respectively, while also reaching number 137 on the Belgian Albums chart.

In the UK, the album did not enter the UK Albums chart but did peak at number 36 and number 35 on the UK Digital Albums and UK Independent Albums chart. It also reached number 7 on the UK R&B Albums chart.

== Track listing ==
All tracks produced by J. White Did It, except where noted

In My Defense track listing
No.	Title	Writer(s)	Producer(s)	Length
1.	"Thanks I Get"	Amethyst Amelia Kelly; Ronny Wright; Lonnie Kimble Sr.		2:34
2.	"Clap Back"	Kelly; Lonnie Kimble; Ronny Wright		3:28
3.	"Sally Walker"	Kelly; Ronny Wright		2:58
4.	"Hoemita" (featuring Lil Yachty)	Kelly; Miles Parks McCollum		3:03
5.	"Started"	Kelly; Ronny Wright		3:06
6.	"Spend It"	Kelly; Ronny Wright		3:12
7.	"Fuck It Up" (featuring Kash Doll)	Kelly; Arkeisha Knight		2:51
8.	"Big Bag" (featuring Stini)	Kelly; Stini	Go Grizzly; Smash David	2:49
9.	"Comme des Garçons"	Kelly	Rico Beats	3:39
10.	"Freak of the Week" (featuring Juicy J)	Kelly; Jordan Houston		3:12
11.	"Just Wanna"	Kelly		2:47
12.	"Pussy Pop"	Kelly		1:53
Total length:				35:32

Samples

- "Freak of the Week" contains elements of "Slob on My Knob" by Tear Da Club Up Thugs, written by Jordan Houston and Paul Beauregard.
- "Just Wanna" contains elements of "Push It" by Salt-N-Pepa.

== Personnel ==
Credits adapted from Tidal.

Performance

- Iggy Azalea – primary artist
- Lil Yachty – featured artist (track 4)
- Kash Doll – featured artist (track 7)
- Stini – featured artist (track 8)
- Juicy J – featured artist (track 10)

Production

- J. White Did It – executive production, production (tracks 1–7, 10–12)
- Go Grizzly – production (track 8)
- Smash David – production (track 8)
- Rico Beats – production (track 9)

Technical

- AJ Putman – vocal engineering (tracks 1–7, 9–12)
- Mac Attkisson – vocal engineering (tracks 1, 11)
- Vekz Madison – vocal engineering (tracks 8–9)
- Chris Davis – vocal engineering (track 8)
- Evan LaRay – mixing (tracks 1–9, 11–12)
- Leslie Brathwaite – mixing (track 10)

Artwork

- Annie Madison – graphic design
- Thom Kerr – photography

== Charts ==
Chart performance for In My Defense
Chart (2019)	Peak position
Australian Albums (ARIA)	52
Australian Urban Albums (ARIA)	18
Belgian Albums (Ultratop Wallonia)	137
Irish Independent Albums (IRMA)	13
UK Album Downloads (Official Charts)	36
UK Independent Albums (Official Charts)	35
UK R&B Albums (Official Charts)	7
US Billboard 200	50
US Independent Albums (Billboard)	6
US Top R&B/Hip-Hop Albums (Billboard)	25

== Release history ==
Release history for In My Defense
Region	Date	Format	Label	Ref.
Various	19 July 2019	Digital download; streaming	Bad Dreams	
Various	2 August 2019	CD	Bad Dreams	
Various	26 August 2019	LP; cassette	Bad Dreams	
