= Woptober II =

Studio album by Gucci Mane
- Released: October 18, 2019
- Recorded: 2019
- Genres: Hip-hop; trap
- Length: 36:00
- Labels: GUWOP; Atlantic
- Producers: Gucci Mane (exec.); Bobby Kritical; Cheeze Beatz; Da Honorable C.N.O.T.E.; Doughboy; DY; Lex Luger; London on da Track; J. White Did It; Metro Boomin; Nick Seeley; Nils; Quay Global; Southside; Tay Keith; TM88; Yung Lan; Zaytoven

Gucci Mane chronology
Delusions of Grandeur (2019)	Woptober II (2019)	East Atlanta Santa 3 (2019)

Singles from Woptober II
- 1. "Richer Than Errybody" Released: September 13, 2019; 2. "Big Booty" Released: October 4, 2019; 3. "Tootsies" Released: October 11, 2019

Professional ratings
Aggregate scores
Source	Rating
Metacritic	76/100
Review scores
Source	Rating
AllMusic	4.5/5 stars
HipHopDX	2.9/5
NME	4/5 stars
Pitchfork	6.1/10

Woptober II is the fourteenth studio album by American rapper Gucci Mane. It was released on October 18, 2019, by Atlantic Records and GUWOP Enterprises. The album features guest appearances from YoungBoy Never Broke Again, DaBaby, Megan Thee Stallion, Lil Baby, Kodak Black, London on da Track, Migos members Quavo and Takeoff, Peewee Longway, Kevin Gates, Yung Mal, OJ da Juiceman, among others. Production is handled by TM88, Southside, Metro Boomin, Lex Luger, and London on da Track, among others.

== Singles ==
The album's lead single, "Richer Than Errybody", was released on September 13, 2019. The song features guest appearances from American rappers YoungBoy Never Broke Again and DaBaby, while the production was provided by Lex Luger.

The second single, "Big Booty", was released on October 4, 2019. The song features a guest appearance from American rapper Megan Thee Stallion and was produced by J. White Did It.

The album's third single, "Tootsies", was released on October 11, 2019. The song features American rapper Lil Baby and was produced by Quay Global.

The promotional single, "Big Boy Diamonds" was released with the album on October 18, 2019. The song features vocals from American rapper Kodak Black and American producer London on da Track and was produced by London on da Track.

== Commercial performance ==
Woptober II debuted at number nine on the US Billboard 200 with 31,000 album-equivalent units (including 2,000 were pure album sales). It is Gucci Mane's seventh US top-10 album.

== Track listing ==
Credits adapted from Tidal.

No.	Title	Writer(s)	Producer(s)	Length
1.	"Richer than Errybody" (featuring YoungBoy Never Broke Again and DaBaby)	Radric Davis; Kentrell Gaulden; Jonathan Kirk; Lexus Lewis	Lex Luger	3:57
2.	"Big Booty" (featuring Megan Thee Stallion)	Davis; Megan Pete; Anthony White; Richard Evans; David Hobbs; Mark Ross; Christopher Wongwon	J. White Did It	2:08
3.	"Tootsies" (featuring Lil Baby)	Davis; Dominique Jones; Chris Rosser	Quay Global	3:09
4.	"Big Boy Diamonds" (featuring Kodak Black and London on da Track)	Davis; Bill Kapri; London Holmes; Nick Seeley	London on da Track; Nick Seeley	2:31
5.	"Came from Scratch" (featuring Quavo)	Davis; Quavious Marshall; Brytavious Chambers	Tay Keith	2:32
6.	"Move Me"	Davis; White; Orville Hall; Phillip Price	J. White Did It	2:40
7.	"Bucking the System" (featuring Kevin Gates)	Davis; Kevin Gilyard; Xavier Dotson	Zaytoven	3:22
8.	"Opps and Adversaries"	Davis; Milan Modi; Darryl McCorkell	Yung Lan; Cheeze Beatz	3:37
9.	"Highly Recommended"	Davis; Dwan Avery; Bryan Simmons; Nils Noehden	DY; TM88; Nils	2:31
10.	"Wop Longway Takeoff" (featuring Peewee Longway and Takeoff)	Davis; Quincy Williams; Bobby Turner, Jr.; Kirshnik Ball; Carlton Mays Jr.	Da Honorable C.N.O.T.E.; Bobby Kritical	2:00
11.	"Last Night" (featuring Yung Mal and OJ da Juiceman)	Davis; Dotson; Jamal Braud	Zaytoven	2:24
12.	"Time to Move"	Davis; Joshua Luellen; Avery; Simmons	Southside; DY; TM88	2:36
13.	"Break Bread"	Davis; Leland Wayne; Bradley Brandon	Metro Boomin; Doughboy	2:35
Total length:				36:00

Notes

- "Big Boy Diamonds" features background vocals by Vaughn Biggs

Sample credits

- "Big Booty" contains a sample from "Hoochie Mama", written by Richard Evans, David Hobbs, Mark Ross, and Christopher Wongwon, as performed by 2 Live Crew.

== Personnel ==
Credits adapted from Tidal.

Musicians

- Nick Seeley – keyboards (track 4), percussion (track 4)
- Metro Boomin – keyboards (track 13), programming (track 13)

Technical

- Amani Hernández – mixing (track 1), mixing assistant (tracks 3–12)
- Jaycen Joshua – mixing (track 2)
- DJ Riggins – mixing assistant (track 2)
- Jacob Richards – mixing assistant (track 2)
- Mike Seaberg – mixing assistant (track 2)
- Colin Leonard – mastering (all tracks)
- Eddie "eMIX" Hernandez – engineering (track 1), mixing (tracks 1, 3–12), recording (tracks 2, 3), vocal engineering (tracks 4–9, 11, 12)
- Ethan Stevens – vocal engineering (track 13), mixing (track 13), recording (track 13)

Additional personnel

- Harmony Korine – photography

== Charts ==
Chart (2019)	Peak position
Canadian Albums (Billboard)	28
US Billboard 200	9
US Top R&B/Hip-Hop Albums (Billboard)	7
US Top Rap Albums (Billboard)	6
