= Drip Season 3 =

Mixtape by Gunna
- Released: February 2, 2018
- Recorded: September 2017–January 2018
- Genres: Hip hop; trap
- Length: 52:05
- Label: YSL
- Producers: Metro Boomin (exec.); Beat Dilla; Doughboy; DY; Kacey Khaliel; London on da Track; Nav; Richie Souf; Turbo; Wheezy

Gunna chronology
Drip or Drown (2017)	Drip Season 3 (2018)	Drip Harder (2018)

Singles from Drip Season 3
- 1. "Almighty" Released: January 5, 2018

Drip Season 3 is the fourth mixtape from American rapper Gunna. It was released on February 2, 2018, by his record label, YSL Records. The album features guest appearances from Hoodrich Pablo Juan, Lil Durk, Nav, Metro Boomin, and Lil Yachty. It also features production by Nav, Metro Boomin, Wheezy, Turbo, Kacey Khaliel, Richie Souf and London on da Track, among others. This tape serves as the third installment of his Drip Season series. The deluxe edition was released simultaneously with the regular version, with three extra tracks, featuring guest appearances from Lil Uzi Vert, fellow labelmates Young Jordan and Young Thug, and Lil Baby. The mixtape was supported by one single: "Almighty" featuring Hoodrich Pablo Juan.

A sequel was released on January 7, 2022.

== Background ==
Gunna explained the background of the mixtape, by stating;

"I put a lot of work for [sic] DS3. It's going to be one of my best projects yet! It's got a mix of all my sounds plus some of the new drip I've been working on. I know my fans are gonna love it!"

On November 30, 2017, the EP Drip or Drown was released as a prelude to the mixtape.

== Singles ==
On January 17, 2018, the mixtape's lead single "Almighty" featuring Hoodrich Pablo Juan was released. The Nasser Boulaich-directed music video was released on January 26, 2018.

== Track listing ==
Credits adapted from BMI.

No.	Title	Writer(s)	Producer(s)	Length
1.	"Helluva Price"	Sergio Kitchens; Leland Wayne	Metro Boomin	2:25
2.	"Drippin"	Kitchens; Tony Son	Richie Souf	2:36
3.	"Almighty" (featuring Hoodrich Pablo Juan)	Kitchens; Sterling Pennix; Chandler Durham	Turbo	2:24
4.	"Top Off"	Kitchens; Son	Richie Souf	3:17
5.	"Pedestrian"	Kitchens; Wayne; Wesley Glass; Bradley Brandon	Metro Boomin; Wheezy; Doughboy	3:46
6.	"Lies About You" (featuring Lil Durk)	Kitchens; Durk Banks; Son	Richie Souf	2:56
7.	"Mistress"	Kitchens; Tyjee Eskridge	Beat Dilla	2:51
8.	"Car Sick" (featuring Nav and Metro Boomin)	Kitchens; Navraj Goraya; Wayne; Amir Esmailian	Nav; Metro Boomin	3:40
9.	"My Soul"	Kitchens; Wayne; London Holmes	Metro Boomin; London on da Track	2:38
10.	"No Joke"	Kitchens; Wayne	Metro Boomin	3:15
11.	"Spending Addiction"	Kitchens; Durham; Zairyus Jackson	Turbo; Kacey Khaliel	3:07
12.	"Money Don't Change You"	Kitchens; Dwan Avery	DY	2:37
13.	"Toast Up"	Kitchens; Glass	Wheezy	3:50
14.	"Drip or Drown (Remix)" (featuring Lil Yachty) (bonus track)	Kitchens; Miles McCollum; Glass	Wheezy	3:00
Total length:				43.04

Deluxe edition (bonus tracks)
No.	Title	Writer(s)	Producer(s)	Length
15.	"At the Hotel" (featuring Lil Uzi Vert and Young Jordan)	Kitchens; Symere Woods; Jordan Barge; Durham	Turbo	3:49
16.	"King Kong" (featuring Young Thug)	Kitchens; Jeffery Williams; Son	Richie Souf	2:33
17.	"Oh Okay" (featuring Young Thug and Lil Baby)	Kitchens; Williams; Dominique Jones; Durham	Turbo	3:19
Total length:				52:05

== Charts ==
=== Weekly charts ===
Chart (2018)	Peak position
US Billboard 200	55
US Top R&B/Hip-Hop Albums (Billboard)	25

=== Year-end charts ===
Chart (2018)	Position
US Billboard 200	124
US Top R&B/Hip-Hop Albums (Billboard)	71

== Certifications ==
Region	Certification	Certified units/sales
United States (RIAA)	Gold	500,000^{‡}
^{‡} Sales+streaming figures based on certification alone.
