= Alice Chater =

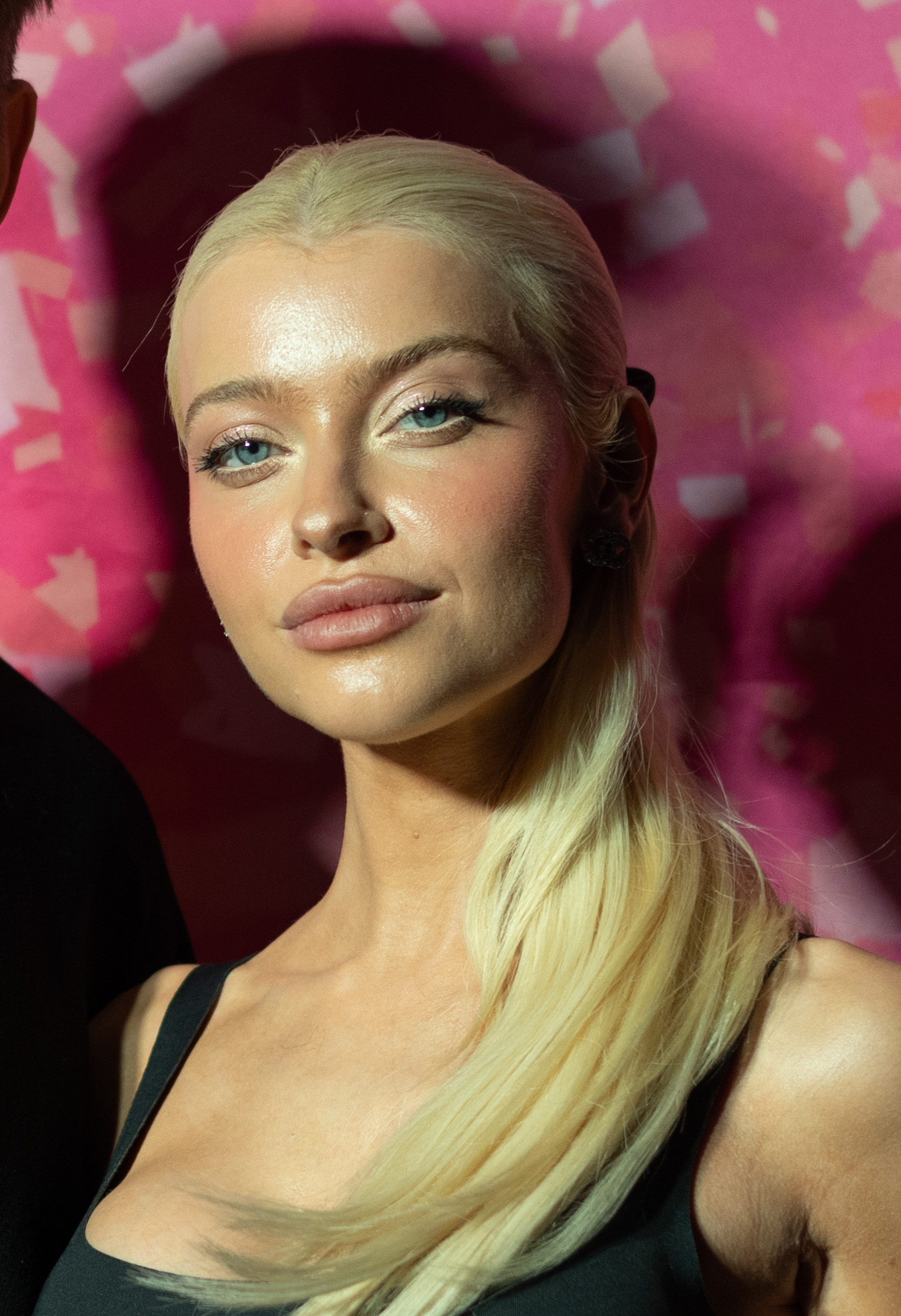
- Chater in 2024
- Born: Alice Victoria Rose Chater; 1992 (age 33–34); Margate, England
- Occupation: Singer-songwriter
- Years active: 2015–present
- Musical career
- Genre: Pop
- Label: Virgin EMI Epic Records

Alice Victoria Rose Chater is an English singer, songwriter and dancer.

After releasing covers online throughout the mid-2010s, she eventually signed to Virgin EMI. Since then, she has released several singles, including "Lola" by Iggy Azalea and "Got It All" by Professor Green. She peaked at #3 on US Billboard Next Big Sound Chart. Alice collaborated with Professor Green on 'Got It All', a song that hit No.2 on UK iTunes, trended at No.6 on YouTube and was added to Hot Hits UK on Spotify. It was also her first entry on official singles chart in the UK, peaking at #48 and spent a total of three weeks on the chart. The same year she headlined as one of the front acts of Céline Dion's show at BST Hyde Park music festival. Furthermore, Chater has performed across the UK with full-throttle performances including the Mighty Hoopla festival and Brighton Pride alongside Kylie Minogue. In September 2019, Alice set out on her first UK headline tour, which included her second sold out London show. Gay Times UK hailed her as "Britain’s new pop princess."

== Life and career ==
Chater attended the Italia Conti Academy of Theatre Arts in London and signed a recording contract with Virgin EMI Records in 2017.

She has written songs with songwriters and producers including Rami Yacoub, Carl Falk, Mark Ralph, Kee Ingrosso and Rachel Furner.

Chater released three covers in 2017 before releasing her own original music, covering "More Than You Know" by Axwell & Ingrosso which originally featured uncredited production by LIOHN & Salvatlre and uncredited vocals from Kristoffer Fogelmark. This was followed by a cover of Mariah Carey's "Vision Of Love" and Madonna's "Hung Up."

She released her visual introduction video "My Name Is Alice" in April 2018, followed by the release of her first single, "Girls x Boys," later that month. The second 2018 single, titled "Heartbreak Hotel", includes a sample from Anita Ward's 1979 song "Ring My Bell". Her third single, "Hourglass", was released 3 October 2018 and samples the Human League's 1981 hit, "Don't You Want Me", as well as Allie X's 2016 song "Casanova". Two singles, "Wonderland (My Name Is Alice)," and "Thief," were released on 11 January 2019 and 18 January 2019 respectively.

On 2 August 2019, she released her single, "Tonight" along with a music video on YouTube.

Chater released the collaboration "Lola" with Australian rapper Iggy Azalea in November 2019. The song charted in the UK, the US, Scotland, and New Zealand. The duo performed the song at the International Music Awards in Berlin, Germany.

On 21 May 2020, she released another solo single "Two Of Us", with a video for the song following a week after on 28 May. Bizu Yaregal from Euphoria Magazine gave it a positive review saying, “'Two Of Us' is best described as devastatingly beautiful, and shows a different and more stripped-back side to the performer. Produced by MYKL (who has worked with the likes of Zayn Malik and Mabel) the song talks about a relationship that is ending, and such a personal topic pushes Chater to showcase the best of her extraordinary vocal ability."

On 24 July that same year, she released the promotional single "Pretty In Pink", which featured a lyric video and talked about self-empowerment, which led up to 7 August, when she released her EP "Aries."

She also has a Christmas song where she covers Leona Lewis. The cover is titled "One More Sleep," released on 21 December 2020. She is featured on "N.Y.E." from Iggy Azalea's deluxe version of "The End of an Era" which was released in September 2021.

Chater came back after 3 years of absence in the music scene by signing with Epic Records a subsidiary of Sony Music and released new song "Don't Let My Boyfriend Get In Your Way" on 19 July 2024.

== Personal life ==
Chater is from England. Her mother is a teacher. She was inspired to sing as a child by her parents' opera collection, as well as singers Mariah Carey, Whitney Houston and Christina Aguilera. She cites Etta James, Katy Perry and Madonna as influences. In an interview in late 2019, Chater was asked the inspirations that played a part in the music she create, the pop singer said that she was inspired by Christina Aguilera, Céline Dion and Whitney Houston vocally and Michael Jackson and Britney Spears on her moves.

== Discography ==
=== Extended plays ===
Title	Album details
My WonderL.A.N.D.	Released: 27 March 2015; Label: Dakota Music Group; Formats: Digital download, streaming
Aries	Released: 7 August 2020; Label: Virgin EMI; Formats: Digital download, streaming

=== Singles ===
==== As lead artist ====
Title	Year	Peak chart positions			Album
Title	Year	UK Down.	NZ Hot	US Rap	Album
"Girls x Boys"	2018	—	—	—	Non-album singles
"Heartbreak Hotel"	2018	—	—	—	Non-album singles
"Hourglass"	2018	—	—	—	Non-album singles
"Wonderland (My Name is Alice)"	2019	—	—	—	Non-album singles
"Thief"	2019	—	—	—	Non-album singles
"Tonight"	2019	—	—	—	Non-album singles
"Lola" (with Iggy Azalea)	2019	84	28	9	Wicked Lips and Aries
"Two of Us"	2020	—	—	—	Aries
"Pretty in Pink"	2020	—	—	—	Aries
"Don't Let My Boyfriend Get In Your Way"	2024	—	—	—	Non-album singles
"Come Alive"	2024	—	—	—	Non-album singles
"Bed of Lies"	2025	—	—	—	Non-album singles

==== As featured artist ====
List of singles, with selected chart positions and certifications
Title	Year	Peak chart positions		Certifications	Album
Title	Year	UK	SCO	Certifications	Album
"Got It All" (Professor Green featuring Alice Chater)	2019	48	22	BPI: Silver	M.O.T.H.

=== Promotional singles ===
Title	Year	Album
"Vision of Love"	2017	Non-album songs
"More Than You Know"	2017	Non-album songs
"Hung Up"	2017	Non-album songs
"One More Sleep"	2020	Non-album songs

=== Guest appearances ===
List of guest backing appearances for other performing artists, showing year released and album name
Title	Year	Other artist(s)	Album
"Alice"	2019	Professor Green	M.O.T.H.
"N.Y.E."	2021	Iggy Azalea	The End of an Era (Deluxe)
