= Kash Doll =

American rapper (born 1989)

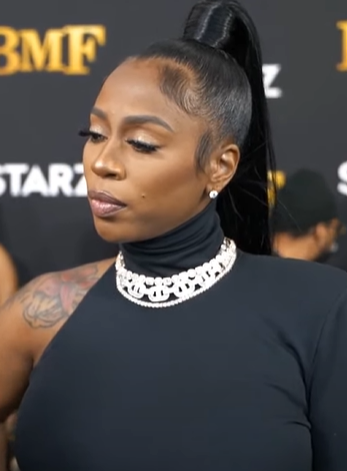
- Kash Doll in 2021

Background information
- Born: Arkeisha Antoinette Knight; March 14, 1989 (age 37); Detroit, Michigan, U.S.
- Genre: Hip hop
- Occupations: Rapper; songwriter; actress
- Years active: 2014–present
- Labels: Republic; Kash Doll Enterprises, Inc.; MNRK
- Children: 2
- Website: kashdoll.com

Arkeisha Antoinette Knight (born March 14, 1989), known professionally as Kash Doll, is an American rapper and actress from Detroit, Michigan. Signed to Republic Records, she is best known for her singles "For Everybody" (2017) and "Ice Me Out" (2018), the latter of which became the lead single from her debut album Stacked (2019). Her sophomore album, The Last Doll, came out in late 2024. Kash Doll has collaborated with artists including Meek Mill, Big Sean, Iggy Azalea, DreamDoll and K. Michelle.

== Early life ==
Kash Doll was born on March 14, 1989, and raised in Detroit, Michigan. The oldest of six siblings, she began working at a young age to help her single mother support their family. She had the desire to rap at an early age and started freestyling and writing lyrics as a young girl.

She attended Henry Ford College for business management but left after a year. To support the financial needs of her family, Kash became a strip club dancer. While working as a dancer, Kash would rap and eventually started earning money from patrons at the nightclub without having to dance. It was reported that one night she made $26,000.

== Career ==
Early in her career, Kash Doll performed in local clubs, schools and charity events in the Detroit area. Kash Doll later signed a deal with a local recording company in Detroit which later fell through. She then began using social media to build a following by releasing short videos of herself rapping. Drake used Instagram to invite her to open a show for him on his Summer Sixteen tour stop in Detroit.

Kash Doll remixed Tinashe's single "2 On" in 2015. She then released a video for a single called "Run Me My Money", which went viral in 2015. That same year she released her mixtape, Keisha vs Kash Doll. In December 2017, Kash Doll appeared on Big Sean and Metro Boomin's single "So Good". After being released from her previous deal, on July 16, 2018, she released an EP called The Vault on streaming platforms. One music video from the EP, "For Everybody", received over 10 million views on YouTube.

She released a mixtape called Brat Mail on her birthday in 2018. It was dedicated to her fans, who she refers to as "Bratz". In August 2018, Kash Doll signed a record deal with Republic Records. She then released her first single as a part of that deal, "Ice Me Out". Kash Doll released a single called "Hustla" in April 2019, which highlights her experiences from working at strip clubs. She stated that she is trying to awareness for and advocate on behalf of the women in that industry. On June 7, 2019, Kash Doll released a new single titled "Kitten" that features American rapper Lil Wayne. Kash Doll featured on Australian rapper Iggy Azalea's single "Fuck It Up" from Azalea's 2019 studio album, In My Defense. Kash Doll was also an opening performer for Meek Mill's 2019 The Motivation Tour.

She made her TV debut as herself in 2 episodes of Empire in 2020. She has a recurring role as Monique in Starz series BMF as of 2021.

== Personal life ==
In September 2021, Kash Doll announced on Instagram that she was expecting her first child with Atlanta rapper, Tracy T. She gave birth to their son on January 6, 2022. In March 2024, Kash Doll announced on Instagram that she was expecting her second child. She gave birth to their daughter on June 12, 2024.

== Filmography ==
Year	Title	Role	Notes
2020	Empire	Herself	Season 6, 2 episodes
2021—2025	BMF	Monique	Recurring role (seasons 1—2): Main cast (season 4—present)
2024	Diarra from Detroit	Maisha	Recurring role
2024	Married to Medicine	Herself	Episode: "Quad Gets Her Groove Back"
2024	Baddies Midwest & Gone Wild Auditions	Herself	Judge

== Discography ==
=== Albums ===
List of albums with selected details
Title	Details	Peak chart positions
Title	Details	US
Stacked	Released: October 18, 2019; Label: Republic; Formats: Digital download, Streaming	76
The Last Doll	Released: November 15, 2024; Label: Kash Doll Enterprises, Inc., MNRK Records; Formats: Digital download, Streaming	—

=== Collaboration Albums ===
List of mixtapes with selected details
Title	Details
Back on Dexter (with DJ Drama)	Released: February 10, 2023; Label: Kash Doll Enterprises, Inc., MNRK Records; Formats: Digital download, Streaming

=== Mixtapes ===
List of mixtapes with selected details
Title	Details
Brat Mail	Released: March 14, 2018; Label: Republic; Formats: Digital download

=== Extended plays ===
List of extended plays with selected details
Title	Details
The Vault	Released: July 16, 2018; Label: Republic; Formats: Digital download

=== Singles ===
==== As lead artist ====
Song	Year	Album
"His & Hers"	2015	Non-album singles
"Run Me My Money"	2016	Non-album singles
"Accurate"	2016	Non-album singles
"For Everybody"	2017	Non-album singles
"Serious" (featuring Natasha Mosley)	2017	Brat Mail
"Dancin"	2017	Brat Mail
"Check"	2018	Brat Mail
"Here I Go"	2018	The Vault
"So Crazy"	2018	The Vault
"Out of Line"	2018	The Vault
"Ice Me Out"	2018	Stacked
"Hustla"	2019	Non-album single
"Kitten" (featuring Lil Wayne)	2019	Stacked
"Ready Set" (featuring Big Sean)	2019	Stacked
"Mobb'n"	2019	Stacked
"How It's Done" (with Kim Petras, Stefflon Don, and Alma)	2019	Charlie's Angels
"Bad Azz" (with DJ Infamous featuring Benny the Butcher and Latto)	2020	Non-album singles
"Bossa Nova" (featuring Tee Grizzley)	2020	Non-album singles
"Thumbin"	2021	Non-album singles
"Like A Pro" (featuring Juicy J)	2021	Non-album singles
"Single & Happy" (featuring Wale & Eric Bellinger)	2021	Non-album singles
"Oh Boy" (featuring Skilla Baby, Cash Kidd, Risktaker D-Boy & Djbj 3525)	2023	Back on Dexter
"Add It Up" (featuring Lakeyah)	2023	Back on Dexter
"Ridin"	2023	Non-album single
"Power"	2024	The Last Doll
"Big 1"	2024	The Last Doll
"Fawk Em"	2024	The Last Doll
"Pressin" (featuring Tee Grizzley)	2024	The Last Doll
"Kash Kommandments"	2024	The Last Doll
"Comfy" (featuring Tink)	2024	The Last Doll

==== As featured artist ====
List of singles as featured artist, showing year released and album name
Title	Year	Peak chart positions	Album
Title	Year	NZ Hot	Album
"Fuck It Up" (Iggy Azalea featuring Kash Doll)	2019	40	In My Defense
"Sociopath" (Pusha T featuring Kash Doll)	2019	—	Non-album single

== Awards and nominations ==
Year	Nominee / work	Award	Result	Ref.
2018	Herself	Detroit Music Award for Outstanding Rap MC	Nominated	
2018	Herself	BET Social Award for "Issa Wave"	Won	
2019	Herself	BET Awards 2019 for Best Female Hip-Hop Artist	Nominated	
2020	Stacked	Detroit Music Award for Outstanding National Major Record Label Recording	Nominated	

== See also ==
- Women in hip hop
