= T'Melle =

American singer

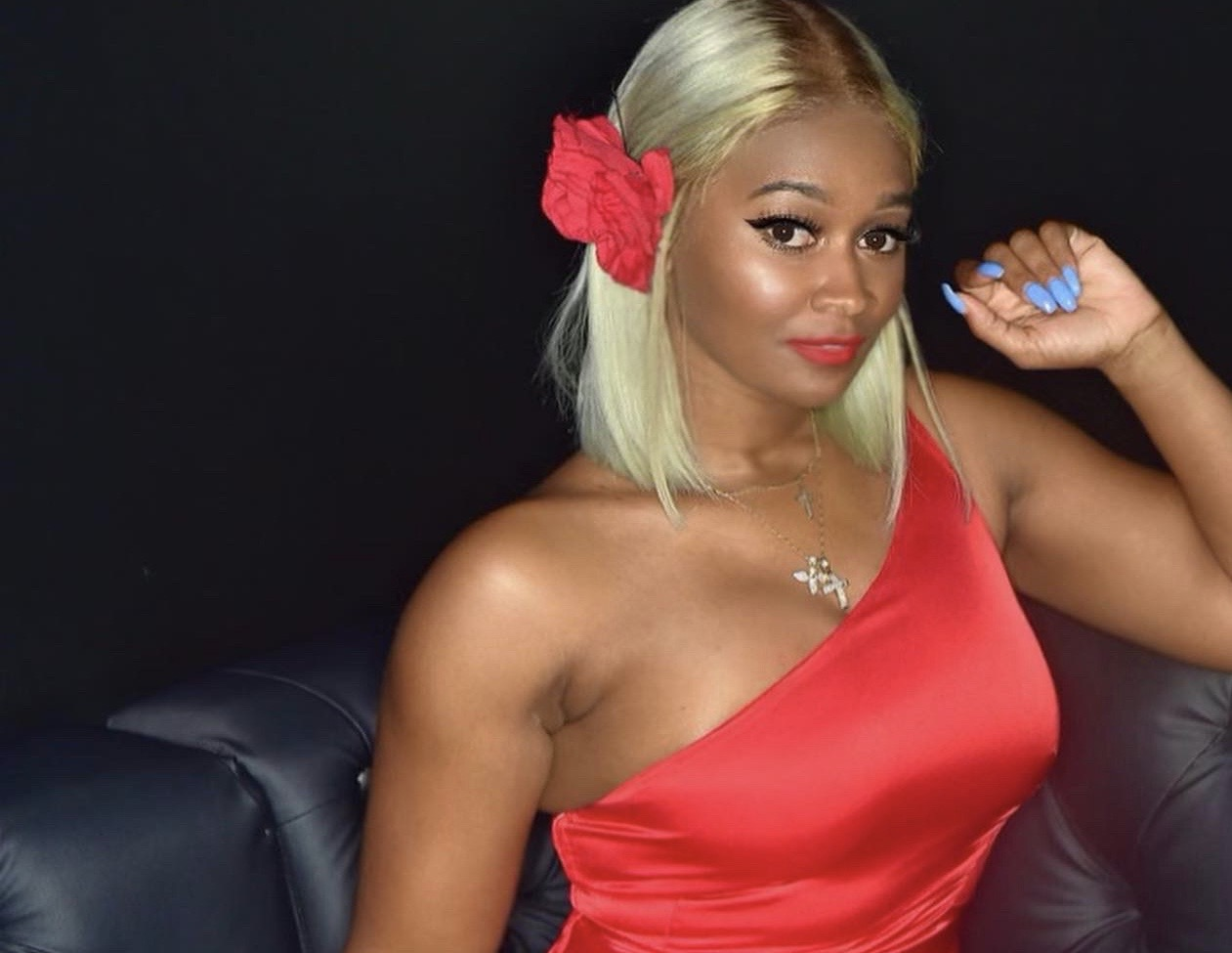

Background information
- Born: T'Melle Rawlings; August 19, 1988 (age 37)
- Origin: Philadelphia, Pennsylvania, U.S.
- Genres: R&B, hip-hop, pop
- Occupations: Singer, songwriter, dancer
- Years active: 2001–present
- Website: Instagram Soundcloud

T'Melle Rawlings, known mononymously as T'Melle, is an American R&B and hip-hop singer, dancer, and songwriter. Rawlings previously worked under the name T'Nef.

== Early career ==
T'Melle was discovered by the late Lisa "Left Eye" Lopes of TLC, who added her to Egypt, one of multiple girl groups she was developing. The other group members were Joy "Zada" Lonon, Katrina "Akila" Gibson, and Sophia "Isis" Gibson. Lopes mentored and managed the group.

On April 25, 2002, a car crash in La Ceiba, Honduras killed Lopes and injured other friends and family members, including T'Melle. T'Melle was among the seriously injured passengers, unable to walk on her own for a time after the crash. T'Melle left the group, began using a wheelchair, and underwent numerous surgeries to her left leg and hip.

== Solo career ==
As a teenager, Rawlings convinced her parents to support her move to Atlanta, Georgia, so she could continue her career path. In Atlanta, T'Melle was introduced to Walter Sutton, CEO of Infra-Red Entertainment, an Atlanta-based entertainment company. T'Melle eventually captured the attention of Usher, accompanying him on a European tour as his only female background singer. She also caught the attention of Grammy Award-winning producer Tricky Stewart, who took her under his wing, aiding in her advancement as an artist.

T'Melle's most recent album, The Interview, was released in 2013. It was preceded by the single Go To War, which was released in April 2011. "Pill" was released on Rapper Future's Mixtape Welcome 2 Mollyworld in late August.

In October 2015, she released an uptempo single entitled "Drop It Down."

In the summer of 2016, she released "Cross the line (ft. Kevin Gates)." The song has surpassed a million plays on SoundCloud.

On March 1, 2019, T'Melle released a remake to Minnie Riperton's "Loving You" in homage to the soul singer.

T'Melle's most recent EP Dedicated was released on Apple Music on December 11, 2020.
