= Started =

2019 single by Iggy Azalea

Single by Iggy Azalea

from the album In My Defense
- Released: 3 May 2019
- Recorded: 2018
- Genre: Hip hop
- Length: 3:06
- Label: Bad Dreams; Empire
- Songwriters: Amethyst Kelly; Ronny Wright
- Producer: J. White Did It

Iggy Azalea singles chronology
"Sally Walker" (2019)	"Started" (2019)	"Boys Like You" (2019)

Music video
- "Started" on YouTube

"Started" is a song recorded by Australian rapper Iggy Azalea for her second studio album In My Defense. The song was written by Azalea alongside Ronny Wright and produced by American record producer J. White Did It. It was released by Bad Dreams and Empire on 3 May 2019 as the second single from the album. An accompanying music video for the track, directed by Colin Tilley, was shot the prior month in Los Angeles, California and also premiered that day.

== Composition ==
"Started" is a hip hop song, with a length of three minutes and six seconds. It was written by Azalea and Ronny Wright and produced by J. White Did It, who had also produced Azalea's previous single "Sally Walker". The track finds Azalea boasting, "I started from the bottom and now I'm rich... You started out hating, now you love my drip." It is described as an unapologetic "brag-heavy cut [...] club banger about making your way to success after having nothing" and was noted to borrowing and twisting the Drake line "started from the bottom," by adding "and now I'm rich".

== Music video ==
=== Background and release ===
A music video for the track was shot in April 2019 in a Los Angeles mansion in California. It was directed by Colin Tilley, who also directed the music videos for Azalea's previous singles, "Savior", "Kream" and "Sally Walker". Azalea said she considered it her best yet by tweeting, "Started is the best video I've ever made." After changing her Twitter layout and unveiling the cover artwork, Azalea followed up her announcement tweet with: "Imagine NOT knowing an Anna Nicole Smith quote when you see one. Can’t relate," and implied the visuals would reference Smith. She then regularly shared more stills from the video on social media, with the presence of a "sugar daddy" and flaunting a lavish lifestyle suggesting the main themes to be wealth and gold digging. She also posted pictures on set of the visuals with drag queen Trixie Mattel and tweeted: "I wrote a scene just for her in sallywalker but she was on tour so I HAD to write her into the story for started when I found out she’d be in town." Azalea confirmed the video would be dropping on the same day.

=== Synopsis ===
The video, which includes an appearance from Trixie Mattel in a skit, as well as Vanessa Vanjie Mateo (who previously made an appearance in the video for "Sally Walker"), features Azalea playing a sugar baby after it opens with her marriage to an older man in a wheelchair, who uses an oxygen mask. Azalea is seen in a short white gown and donning many different looks throughout, including a diamond wig during a pool scene and a suit made out of hundred-dollar bills. Halfway through the video, Azalea starts to grow tired of him until another version of herself and Mattel appear in an infomercial for Die Slow Cake Co., a poison cake mix to kill a sugar daddy, with the jingle: "If your name's in his will and you want your bread/ Call 1-833-DADDYS-DEAD." She then attempts to suffocate him with a cushion on their bed and he eventually dies during a feast. Azalea is left to enjoy her new life on her own by redecorating, with the help of Mateo, and hosting a lavish party afterwards to celebrate her wealth. In the context of the video, the song's lyrics reference how the sugar baby character's many naysayers believed she would not become rich, and has managed to prove them wrong.

== Credits ==
- Iggy Azalea – Primary artist

== Charts ==
Chart (2019)	Peak position
Australia Digital Tracks (ARIA)	37
Canadian Hot Digital Songs (Billboard)	30
France Downloads (SNEP)	122
Greece Digital Songs (Billboard)	10
Hungary (Single Top 40)	12
Ireland (IRMA)	73
New Zealand Hot Singles (RMNZ)	11
Scottish Singles Sales (Official Charts)	43
UK Singles (Official Charts)	76
UK Independent Singles (OCC)	12
US Bubbling Under Hot 100 (Billboard)	20
US Bubbling Under R&B/Hip-Hop Singles (Billboard)	3

== Certifications ==
Region	Certification	Certified units/sales
United States (RIAA)	Gold	500,000^{‡}
^{‡} Sales+streaming figures based on certification alone.

== Release history ==
Region	Date	Format	Label	Ref.
Various	3 May 2019	Digital download; streaming	Bad Dreams; Empire	
United States	11 June 2019	Rhythmic contemporary	Bad Dreams; Empire	
