= Doughboy (music producer) =

American record producer

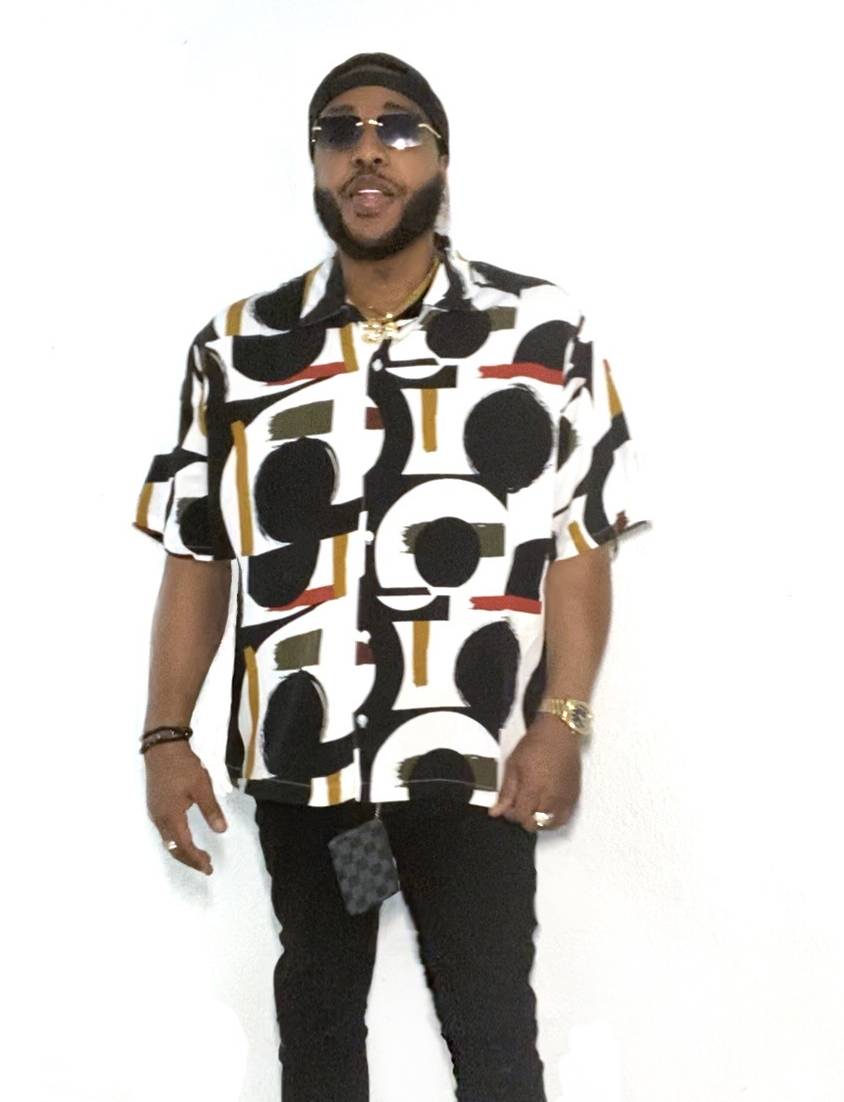
- Doughboy in 2024

Background information
- Also known as: Doughboy Beatz
- Born: Bradley Brandon; September 1, 1989 (age 36); Columbus, Mississippi, U.S.
- Genres: Hip hop; trap; R&B
- Occupations: Record producer; songwriter
- Instrument: FL Studio
- Years active: 2008–present
- Labels: Boominati Worldwide, Republic

Bradley Brandon (born September 1, 1989), known professionally as Doughboy Beatz or simply Doughboy, is an American record producer from Columbus, Mississippi. He is perhaps best known for producing "Fried (She A Vibe)" by rapper Future as well as "Pedestrian" by rapper Gunna and "Lost It" by rapper Rich The Kid featuring Offset and Quavo of Migos which was certified gold by the RIAA.

Doughboy has produced several tracks for various artists such as Gucci Mane, Future, 21 Savage, NBA Youngboy, Young Dolph, Jeezy, Yo Gotti, Lil Durk, Juicy J, Money Man, Lil Boosie, Latto, YFN Lucci, Plies, DJ Khaled, B.G, CyHi the Prynce, Jelly Roll, among others.

He earned his first Grammy Nomination for his work on 21 Savage's I Am > I Was for Best Rap Album at the 62nd Annual Grammy Awards. He earned another Grammy Nomination for his work on Future and Metro Boomin's We Don't Trust You for Best Rap Album at the 67th Annual Grammy Awards.

== Early life and career ==
Brandon started making beats at the age of 15, for his younger brother on FL Studio. He then went on to produce Hitz Committee/Jive Records signee, Trai'D's lead single "Gutta Chick" in 2008. "Gutta Chick" peaked at number 72 on the Billboard Hot R&B/Hip-Hop Songs charts. Doughboy has worked with many other major artists since then.

Throughout the 2010s, Doughboy has followed up with production on many highly acclaimed projects that include Jeezy's Trap or Die 2, Shy Glizzy's Law 3, Rich The Kid's The World Is Yours, Gunna's Drip Season 3 and Gucci Mane's East Atlanta Santa.

Brandon has also worked with other music producers that include Metro Boomin, Wheezy, Drumma Boy, Southside, Zaytoven, Shawty Redd, Sonny Digital, Honorable C.N.O.T.E., DJ Paul, Juicy J and more.

In September 2019, Doughboy signed with Metro Boomin's Boominati Worldwide label. Boominati Worldwide has a partnership with Republic Records and Universal Music Group.

== Discography ==
=== Studio albums ===
List of studio albums, with selected details
Title	Album details
October 31st (with Joker Too Cold)	Released: September 1, 2016; Label: Dough Mentality Group; Format: digital download

== Production credits ==
=== 2008 ===
Soulja Boy

- 00. "Pistol Play"

Tha Joker

- 00. "Respect Me" (feat. Yung Envy)
- 00. "Allow Me To Introduce Myself"
- 00. "Pull Out The Old Skool"
- 00. "Real Talk"
- 00. "My Alarm"
- 00. "Put It On My Face" (feat. CG Whatitdew)
- 00. "My Ride"

Trai'D

- 00. "Gutta Chick"
- 00. "Hit Da Flo"

Ace Hood - All Bets on Ace

- 09. "Gutta Bitch"

Trai'D - Don't Worry I Got It

- 00. "Gutta Chick" (remix) (feat. DJ Khaled, Ace Hood, Trina, Bun B & Hurricane Chris)

Jibbs

- 00. "Whippin The Rhyme"

=== 2009 ===
Cyhi Da Prynce - What Da Decs Been Missin Vol.1

- 11. "Get Away"

Crooked I - After Inauguration

- 09. "Prove Them Wrong"

OJ Da Juiceman - Alaska In Atlanta

- 03. "Haters"

Waka Flocka Flame - Shootin The Breeze Cookin That Fire

- 13. "Mrs. Flocka"

Arab - Arab Money

- 03. "Chingaling"

J-Bar - Da Guap

- 05. "I Want Her (OJ With The Vodka)" (feat. Soulja Boy)
- 06. "Sway"

Waka Flocka Flame & Slim Dunkin - Twin Towers

- 06. "I Love" (feat. Capp)

=== 2010 ===
Jeezy - Trap or Die 2

- 06. "My Camaro"

Alley Boy - Definition Of Fuck Shit Vol. 1

- 15. "Finesse"

Tay Don - Death Of Tay Beatz

- 04. "Robbin Season"
- 05. "Knock Knock"
- 18. "Keep On Pushing"

DJ Genius & DJ Blu Present Envy, Nation & Cyco - Black Sunday

- 05. "Bump Dey Head

P. Dukes - Dirty Glove Bastard & Baller's Eve Present: Block Tested, Hood Approved

- 01. "Block Tested, Hood Approved" (Produced with Sonny Digital)

=== 2011 ===
Doe Boy & Lex Luger - Boyz N Da Hood

- 06. "Real Talk"
- 11. "Street Commandments"

Lil Boosie & Ray Vicks - Under Investigation

- 02. "Go Hard"
- 09. "Ur Name"
- 11. "I Pledge Allegiance"
- 12. "Xstacy"
- 13. "Top Ten"
- 15. "Under Investigation"

Lil Twist

- 00. "Got Her Like"

B.G.

- 00. "Playing Games" (feat. Lil Boosie & Gar)

Kourtney Money - OJ Da Juiceman Presents 32 Ent: The Compilation

- 00. "We Out Chea" (Produced with Metro Boomin)

=== 2012 ===
Starlito - Mental Warfare

- 02. "Hope For Love"

8Ball - Premro

- 07. "Jumpin Up"

Shawty Redd - Rap Now, Produce Later

- 10. "Remy" (feat. Project Pat)

GC Eternal of Kinfolk Thugs

- 00. "They Don't Make Em Like This" (feat. Playa Fly and MJG)

=== 2013 ===
Rich The Kid

- 00. "Couple Bandz"
- 00. "Whole Hood" (feat. Sy Ari Da Kid)

DJ Paul & Drumma Boy - Clash Of The Titans

- 05. "Cocaine" (feat. Jelly Roll)

Yo Gotti

- 00. "Lost Count" (feat. Lil' Lody)

Gucci Mane & Young Scooter - Free Bricks 2

- 03. "Not Ballin" (Produced with Metro Boomin)

8Ball - Premro 2

- 01. "Bigger Vision"

Tha Joker - The Explanation

- 00. "F.H.I.T.O."

=== 2014 ===
Gucci Mane - East Atlanta Santa

- 12. "Riding Dirty" (Produced with Metro Boomin & Honorable C.N.O.T.E.)

Shy Glizzy - Law 3

- 05. "What U Talkin Bout"

=== 2015 ===
Chief Keef

- 00. "Road Runner" (Produced with Metro Boomin & Jay-O Luciano)

Shy Glizzy & Glizzy Gang - Be Careful

- 04. "Above The Rim"

OJ Da Juiceman - Bouldercrest El Chapo

- 06. "So Much" (Produced with Metro Boomin)
- 13. "Millionaire Dreams"

Tha Joker

- 00. "F.H.I.T.O." (feat. Riff Raff, K Camp & Raven Felix)

=== 2016 ===
Shy Glizzy - Young Jefe 2

- 04. "New Crack"

Tha Joker & Doughboy Beatz - October 31: The Mixtape

- 01. "Old Ways"
- 02. "Bandit"
- 03. "Soirée"
- 05. "Juice"
- 07. "Run Up"
- 08. "4 A.M."

=== 2017 ===
Doe Boy - In FreeBandz We Trust 2

- 01. "Savage Back"

Money Man - Secret Society

- 01. "Secret Society" (Produced with Trauma Tone)

Shy Glizzy - Quiet Storm

- 01. "Quiet Storm"
- 11. "Keep It Goin"

Starlito & Don Trip - Step Brothers 3

- 13. "Remember"

Starlito - Manifest Destiny

- 04. "Too Much" (Produced with Metro Boomin)

Tha Joker - Why So Serious 3?

- 01. "45"
- 02. "Run Up"
- 03. "Blue Strips" (Produced with Trauma Tone)
- 05. "4 A.M"
- 09. "Piece Of Mind"
- 10. "I'd Rather"

=== 2018 ===
Gunna - Drip Season 3

- 05. "Pedestrian" (Produced with Metro Boomin & Wheezy)

Juicy J - 901 Drip

- 11. "Built" (feat. YKOM) (Produced with Juicy J & YK808)

Money Man - Grow God

- 09. "Fake Friends" (Produced with Trauma Tone)

NBA Youngboy - 4Respect 4Freedom 4Loyalty 4WhatImportant

- 16. "We Dem" (Produced with DJ Swift)

Plies - Ain't No Mixtape Bih 3

- 18. "Best Life" (Produced with Trauma Tone)

Q Money - Neva Had Shit

- 09. "Whole Ticket" (feat. YFN Lucci)(Produced with Trauma Tone)

Rich The Kid - The World Is Yours

- 09. "Lost It" (feat. Offset & Quavo of Migos) (Produced with Metro Boomin & Wheezy)

Shy Glizzy - Fully Loaded

- 18. "I Need Mo"

21 Savage - I Am > I Was

- 02. "Break Da Law" (Produced with Metro Boomin & Southside)

=== 2019 ===
Offset - Father of 4

- 09. "Don't Lose Me" (Produced with Metro Boomin)
- 09. "On Fleek" (feat. Quavo) (Produced with Metro Boomin & Zaytoven)

Gunna

- 00. "Mr. T" (Produced with Metro Boomin)

Future

- 00. "Perkies" (Produced with Metro Boomin)

D-Block Europe - PTSD

- 23. "Back To Back" (Produced with Tre Pounds of 808 Mafia)

Gucci Mane - Woptober II

- 13. "Break Bread" (Produced with Metro Boomin)

BAD HOP - Lift Off

- 02. "Double Up" (Produced with Metro Boomin)

Gucci Mane - East Atlanta Santa 3

- 9. “She Miss Me” (feat. Rich The Kid) (Produced with Metro Boomin & Dre Moon)

=== 2020 ===
Offset

- 00. "World Guinness (Wrist On Froze)" (Produced with Metro Boomin)

=== 2021 ===
Sada Baby

- 00. "1955" (Produced with Trauma Tone)

SG TIP

- 00. "One In The Head" (feat. 21 Lil Harold & Slimelife Shawty) (Produced with Metro Boomin)

Young Dolph - "Paper Route Illuminati"

- 17. "Trust Nobody" (Produced with Bandplay)

=== 2022 ===
Lil Durk & Metro Boomin - No Auto Durk

- 00. "Confessions" (Produced with Metro Boomin)
- 00. "Spot News" (Produced with Metro Boomin)

Big Scarr

- 00. "The Regular" (Produced with Bandplay)

Gucci Mane

- 00. "Blood All On It" (feat. Key Glock and Young Dolph) (Produced with Bandplay)

Big Moochie Grape - East Haiti Baby

- 13. "Acting Up" (Produced with Bandplay)

EBG EJizzle - Walking With The Devil

- 02. "Safe To Say" (Produced with Bandplay)

=== 2023 ===
Offset - Set It Off

- 11. "Night Vision" (Produced with Metro Boomin)

Latto

- 00. "Major" (Produced with Metro Boomin)

=== 2024 ===
Future & Metro Boomin - We Don't Trust You

- 11. "Fried (She A Vibe)" (Produced with Metro Boomin)
