= Stacked (album) =

2019 album by Kash Doll

Studio album by Kash Doll
- Released: October 18, 2019
- Recorded: 2018–2019
- Genre: Hip hop
- Length: 46:45
- Label: Republic
- Producers: 30 Roc; Andre "Dre" Harris; Aukoustics; Catour; Datboisqueeze; Davidior; Dougie on the Beat; Donut; Eazy; Fast Life Beats; FKi 1st; ISM; Nellz; Nic Nac; Parker & Ludlow; Pliznaya; Russ Chell; Soundz; Take a Daytrip; YoungBoyBrown; Young Yonny

Kash Doll chronology
Brat Mail (2018)	Stacked (2019)

Singles from Stacked
- 1. "Ice Me Out" Released: August 24, 2018; 2. "Kitten" Released: June 7, 2019; 3. "Ready Set" Released: July 11, 2019; 4. "Mobb'n" Released: October 4, 2019

Stacked is the debut album by American rapper Kash Doll. It was released on October 18, 2019, by Republic. It features the singles "Ice Me Out" (later remixed by 2 Chainz), "Kitten", "Ready Set", and "Mobb'n". The album features guest appearances from Big Sean, Lil Wayne, Summer Walker, Teyana Taylor, Trey Songz, and LouGotCash. The album sold approximately 28,600 units in its first week of release, in the US.

The album reached number 14 on Billboard's Top Rap Albums chart. It debuted at number 76 on the US Billboard 200.

== Track listing ==
Adapted from Apple Music.

No.	Title	Writer(s)	Producer(s)	Length
1.	"KD Diary"	Arkeisha Knight; Barney Bones; Kenneth Coby	Nellz; Soundz	2:42
2.	"Ready Set" (featuring Big Sean)	Knight; David Biral; Denzel Baptiste; Sean Anderson; Terry Parker	Russ Chell; Take a Daytrip	2:45
3.	"So Amazing"	Knight; Coby; Roe Faniel	Soundz	2:05
4.	"Paid Bitches"	Knight; Ian Matthew Lefkowitz; Parker	Parker & Ludlow	3:23
5.	"Ice Me Out"	Knight; Jason Harris; Trocon Roberts, Jr.	FKi 1st	3:02
6.	"Kitten" (featuring Lil Wayne)	Aliandro Prawl; Andre Harris; Anslem Douglas; Knight; Cassio Lopes; Chloe Chavis; Dwayne Carter, Jr.; Elise Allen; Ishmael Montague; Jeremy Felton; Kyarah Marie; Osbert Gurley; Scott Carter; Valee Taylor	Andre "Dre" Harris; ISM	3:22
7.	"On Sight" (featuring Trey Songz)	Knight; Jacqueline Hendon; Coby; Parker; Verse Simmonds	Soundz	2:48
8.	"Krazy" (featuring LouGotCash)	Knight; Branden Scott; Jackie Hendon; Kyle Frankman; Rahlou Ruth; Tyler Gabriele	Fast Life Beats	2:36
9.	"Mobb'n"	Antwan Patton; Alphonce Smith; Andre Benjamin; Knight; Brandon Bell; Brittany Carpentero; Christopher Henderson; Derrick Milano; Eric Aukstikalnis; Jarques Usher; Jonathan Lewis; Leon Flowers; Patrick Brown; Ray Murray; Rico Wade; Venetia Lewis	Aukoustics; Donut; Pliznaya	2:21
10.	"Cheap Shit"	Andre Calloway; Knight; Justin Tranter; Kamille Brown; Kennedi Lykken	Eazy	2:56
11.	"Doin Too Much"	Knight; Devin Langford; Faniel; Roberts, Jr.	FKi 1st	2:29
12.	"Buss It"	Adarius Moragne; Knight; Deongelo Holmes; Milano; Eric Jackson, Jr.; Michael Crooms; Samuel Gloade	30 Roc; Datboisqueeze	2:25
13.	"No Lames" (featuring Summer Walker)	Knight; Brittney Barber; Devon Langford; Ronald Ferebee, Jr.; Sean Seaton; Summer Walker	Young Yonny	2:50
14.	"Excuses"	Knight; Clifford Smith; Langford; Douglas Whitehead; Leonard Brooks; Nickolas Ashford; Robert Diggs; Valerie Simpson; Milo Williams	Dougie on the Beat	2:30
15.	"Feel Something" (featuring Teyana Taylor)	Knight; David Park; Nicholas Balding; Faniel; Skyler Stonestreet	DaviDior; Nic Nac	2:46
16.	"Coastal Rota"	Knight; Coby Geter; Hendon; Sylvester Samuels; Tasha Catour	Catour	2:34
17.	"100 of Us"	Knight; Hendon; Roberts, Jr.	FKi 1st; YoungBoyBrown	3:03
Total length:				46:38

== Charts ==
Chart (2019)	Peak position
US Billboard 200	76
US Top Rap Albums (Billboard)	14
