= How It's Done (Kash Doll, Kim Petras, Alma and Stefflon Don song) =

2019 single by Kash Doll, Kim Petras, Alma and Stefflon Don

Single by Kash Doll, Kim Petras, Alma and Stefflon Don

from the album Charlie's Angels: Original Motion Picture Soundtrack
- Released: October 11, 2019
- Genre: R&B
- Length: 3:02
- Label: Republic
- Songwriters: Alma-Sofia Miettinen; Ariana Grande; Arkeisha Knight; Ilya Salmanzadeh; Rami Yacoub; Savan Kotecha; Stephanie Allen
- Producers: Ilya; Rami Yacoub; Savan Kotecha (co.)

Kash Doll singles chronology
"Mobb'n" (2019)	"How It's Done" (2019)	"Wake Up" (2020)

Kim Petras singles chronology
"Love Me Less" (2019)	"How It's Done" (2019)	"Click (No Boys Remix)" (2019)

Alma singles chronology
"Bad as the Boys" (2019)	"How It's Done" (2019)	"Worst Behavior" (2019)

Stefflon Don singles chronology
"Hit Me Up" (2019)	"How It's Done" (2019)	"The Reason Why" (2019)

Charlie's Angels singles chronology
"Don't Call Me Angel" (2019)	"How It's Done" (2019)	"Pantera" (2019)

"How It's Done" is a song by American rapper Kash Doll, German singer Kim Petras, Finnish singer Alma and British rapper Stefflon Don. It was released on October 11, 2019, by Republic Records, as the second single from the soundtrack to the film Charlie's Angels, based on the television series of the same name created by Ivan Goff and Ben Roberts.

== Background ==
American singer Ariana Grande revealed the tracklist of the then-upcoming Charlie's Angels: Original Motion Picture Soundtrack on her Twitter. "How It's Done" was made available for purchase upon pre-order. Petras said that she was thankful to be included on the soundtrack.

== Critical reception ==
Shaad D'Souza of The Fader described the song as "an upbeat, vintage-sounding R&B track" and pointed out that it "showcases a new style for all four artists". Mike Nied at Idolator thought the track was "a predictably catchy anthem". MTV News described the song as "party-starting posse cut".

== Credits and personnel ==
Credits adapted from Tidal:

- Alma – vocals, songwriting
- Kim Petras – vocals
- Stefflon Don – vocals, songwriting
- Kash Doll – vocals, songwriting
- Ariana Grande – vocals, songwriting
- Ilya – production, songwriting, programming, backing vocals, bass, drums, keyboards, percussion
- Savan Kotecha – songwriting, co-production
- Rami Yacoub – songwriting, production, programming, backing vocals, bass, horn arrangement, keyboards, percussion, string arrangement
- Michael Engström – bass
- Wojtek Goral – saxophone
- David Bukovinszky – cello
- Mattias Bylund – editing, record engineering, horn, horn arrangement, strings, string arrangement, synthesizing
- Cory Bice – record engineering
- Jeremy Lertola – record engineering
- Sam Holland – record engineering
- John Hanes – mixing engineering
- Serban Ghenea – mixing
- Wojtek Goral – saxophone, tenor saxophone
- Tomas Jonsson – tenor saxophone
- Peter Noos Johansson – trombone
- Janne Bjerger – trumpet
- Magnus Johansson – trumpet
- Mattias Johansson – violin
- Aaron Joseph – vocal engineering, vocal production
- Kalle Keskikuru – vocal engineering
- Parker Ament – vocal engineering
- Rymez – vocal engineering

== Release history ==
Region	Date	Format	Label	Ref.
Various	October 11, 2019	Digital download; streaming	Republic	
United Kingdom	December 26, 2019	Adult contemporary radio	Republic	
