= Sally Walker (song) =

2019 song by Iggy Azalea

Single by Iggy Azalea

from the album In My Defense
- Released: 15 March 2019
- Genre: Hip hop
- Length: 2:58
- Label: Bad Dreams; Empire
- Songwriters: Amethyst Kelly; Anthony White
- Producer: J. White Did It

Iggy Azalea singles chronology
"Kream" (2018)	"Sally Walker" (2019)	"Started" (2019)

Music video
- "Sally Walker" on YouTube

"Sally Walker" is a song by Australian rapper Iggy Azalea. Written alongside producer J. White Did It, it was released on 15 March 2019 as the lead single from her second studio album In My Defense via Bad Dreams Records/Empire Distribution. The music video, directed by Colin Tilley, accompanied its release the same day. The song debuted and peaked at number 62 on the Billboard Hot 100.

== Background ==
On 11 December 2018, Azalea shared a preview of the single through Instagram. In February 2019, the announcement of the single release was accompanied by a picture of Azalea in a "dramatic cobalt-blue eye makeup and a bold red lip" with a "Barbie-esque look" in front of a blood-orange background. The song title is in a cross shape above her head, and below Azalea are the words "A Celebration of Life" and the release date. The official single cover was then unveiled a few days later and featured the rapper posing on the hood of a monster-truck hearse wearing a giant red veil. The title is a reference to children's rhyme dance game Little Sally Walker. American internet personality and makeup artist James Charles, who did Azalea's makeup for the artwork and appeared in the music video, filmed a makeup tutorial with Azalea ahead of the release date.

== Composition ==
"Sally Walker" was written by Azalea alongside its producer J. White Did It, who also serves as the executive producer on In My Defense. The track is two minutes and fifty-eight seconds long. It is a trap-inspired hip hop song, that includes a piano melody. Its piano beat was noted to be similar to Cardi B's "Money" (2018), which was also produced by White, and Kendrick Lamar's "Humble" (2017), produced by Mike Will Made It. The song interpolates the popular nursery rhyme of the same name and follows the same flow. The "sassy, attitude-heavy" lyrics are described as showcasing "an Iggy that is unbothered by criticism as she's her own number one fan."

== Critical reception ==
"Sally Walker" received positive reviews from music critics. Writing for V magazine, Julian Wright stated that Azalea "shows off her lyrical prowess and playful delivery" and the song "weaves through coy choruses of the game's repetitive nursery rhyme and clever bars delivered with heft". HipHopDX commented that "Iggy has been making a huge effort with her career as of lately, and it has been paying off, as many of the work she puts out really slaps," while Rap-Up said "the twerk-ready banger marks a return to Iggy's mixtape roots." Dani Blum of Pitchfork, in an otherwise negative review of its parent album In My Defense, praised "Sally Walker" as the best song on the album, comparing its "sparkling piano chords" to Cardi B's "Money".

== Music video ==
=== Background and release ===
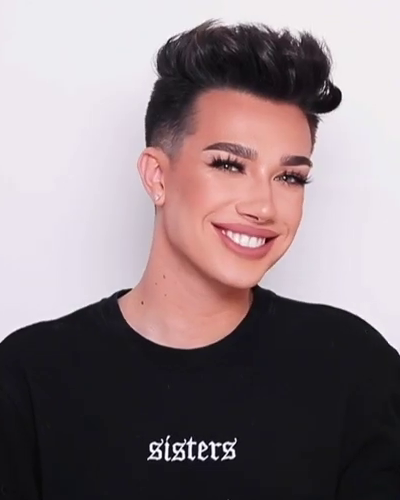
Makeup artist James Charles appears in the video.

Azalea has been teasing the music video for "Sally Walker" since posting a call for the clip on Twitter. She shared various pictures from the music video, which feature her sitting on top of cars in elaborate garments. The clip accompanied the song's release on 15 March 2019. It was shot in Atlanta and directed by Colin Tilley, who previously directed Azalea's videos for "Savior" (2018) and "Kream" (2018). It features cameo appearances by makeup artist James Charles and drag queens Shea Couleé, Vanessa Vanjie Mateo, and Mayhem Miller. The girl who dies in the video is believed to be allusive to American rapper Bhad Bhabie who Azalea once had an incident with. As of April 2025, the video has over 92 million views on YouTube.

=== Synopsis ===
The music video has a funeral-themed storyline. It opens up with Couleé accidentally hitting the title character, Sally Walker, by her car. "Didn't her momma teach her not to play in the street?" she wonders. Mateo, Miller, and Charles appear later as the video moves to Sally's church-set funeral, where a lavender-haired Azalea is rapping from the pews. The video concludes with a preview of another song called "Started", which was released as the follow-up single.

== Live performances ==
The first televised performance of the song took place on Jimmy Kimmel Live! on 4 April 2019 during the show's week-long stint in Las Vegas, with Azalea performing at Zappos Theater at Planet Hollywood in front of the famed Stardust logo. After a solo intro from Vanessa Vanjie Mateo, who is also featured in the song's music video, Azalea emerged from inside a red coffin in a red bodysuit covered with pearls, along with female dancers, as neon logos for some iconic Strip landmarks flashed on stage throughout the performance.

== Usage in media ==
- In March 2024, rapper Sexyy Red subsequently interpolated the song in "Get It Sexyy".
- The song is featured in 2024 Academy Award winning film Anora, directed by Sean Baker, as part of the strip-club songs.

== Charts ==
Chart (2019)	Peak position
Australia Digital Tracks (ARIA)	43
Canada Hot 100 (Billboard)	56
France Downloads (SNEP)	140
Greece Digital Songs (Billboard)	7
Hungary (Single Top 40)	9
Ireland (IRMA)	70
New Zealand Hot Singles (RMNZ)	9
Scottish Singles Sales (Official Charts)	57
UK Singles (Official Charts)	82
UK Independent Singles (OCC)	12
US Billboard Hot 100	62
US Hot R&B/Hip-Hop Songs (Billboard)	30
US Rhythmic Airplay (Billboard)	27

== Certifications ==
Region	Certification	Certified units/sales
United States (RIAA)	Gold	500,000^{‡}
^{‡} Sales+streaming figures based on certification alone.

== Release history ==
Region	Date	Format	Label	Ref.
Various	15 March 2019	Digital download; streaming	Bad Dreams; Empire	
United States	19 March 2019	Rhythmic contemporary	Bad Dreams; Empire	
