= Loudpvck =

American electronic music project

- Origin: Greenwich, CT
- Genres: Trap; hip hop
- Occupations: DJ; musician
- Years active: 2012—2018
- Labels: Dim Mak; Owsla
- Past members: Kenny Beats; Ryan Marks

Loudpvck was an electronic music project consisting of Kenny Beats (born Kenneth Blume III). Originally a duo, the project also included Los Angeles-based DJ Ryan Marks until his departure in November 2017, citing his desire to work on other projects. Loudpvck is best known for collaborating with artists such as NGHTMRE and Zeds Dead, and for remixing songs by artists such as Major Lazer and The Chainsmokers.

== History ==
Marks and Beats met at the Berklee College of Music in Boston in 2009 before going on to form the duo, Loudpvck, which has released original songs alongside a remix of The Chainsmokers' "Paris" in 2017.

On January 13, 2017, Loudpvck released "More Than I Can Take" with Rickyxsan as a single. On February 24, 2017, they collaborated with Botnek to release the song "Traffic".

On November 3, 2017, Ryan Marks announced his departure from the duo, stating he plans to "pursue other things creatively". On Instagram, Marks stated "I trust in Kenny and our team implicitly to continue delivering amazing music and performances without me."

Kenny Beats has seen success since the disbandment of Loudpvck as a solo act with production credits on Gucci Mane and Ski Mask the Slump God projects, among others.

== Discography ==
=== Extended plays ===
Adapted from iTunes.

- Botany (2015)

=== Singles ===
Adapted from iTunes.

- "Wylin" (2014)
- "Tony" (2014)
- "Nagano" (2014)
- "Flies" (2015)
- "Guess Who" (2015)
- "Click Clack" (2016)
- "More Than I Can Take" (2017)
- "Traffic" (2017)
- "Gone" (2017)
- "Bones" (2017)
- "Pace" (2017)
- "Jumanji" (2017)
- "Liar" (2018)

=== Remixes ===
Adapted from WhoSampled.

- Nervo – "Hold On" (2013)
- Carnage and Tony Junior – "Michael Jordan" (2013)
- Brillz and Minxx – "Fuzzy Peach" (2013)
- Kill the Noise – Jump Ya Body (2013)
- Autoerotique – "Asphyxiation" (2013)
- A$AP Rocky - "Multiply" (2014)
- Dada Life – "Freaks Have More Fun" (2015)
- Kill the Noise – "Without a Trace" (2016)
- The Chainsmokers – "Paris" (2017)
