= Primary triad =

Type of musical chord

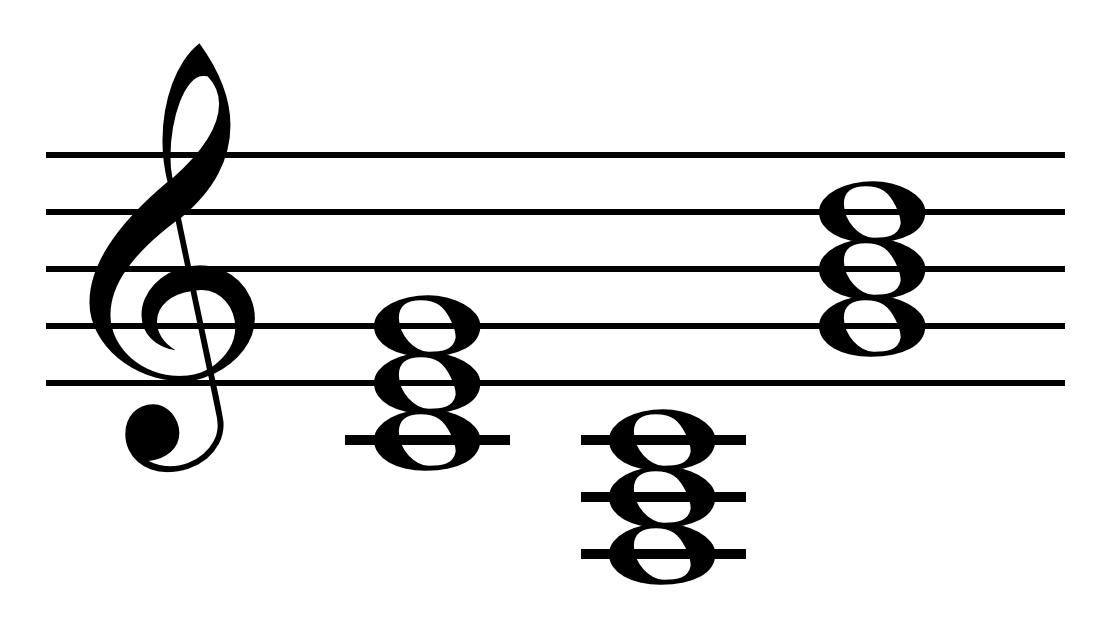
Primary triads in C.

In music, a primary triad is one of the three triads, or three-note chords built from major or minor thirds, most important in tonal and diatonic music, as opposed to an auxiliary triad or secondary triad.

Each triad found in a diatonic key corresponds to a particular diatonic function. Functional harmony tends to rely heavily on the primary triads: triads built on the tonic, subdominant, and dominant degrees. The roots of these triads begin on the first, fourth, and fifth degrees (respectively) of the diatonic scale, otherwise symbolized: I, IV, and V (again, respectively). Primary triads, "express function clearly and unambiguously." The other triads of the diatonic key include the supertonic, mediant, sub-mediant, and leading-tone, whose roots begin on the second, third, sixth, and seventh degrees (respectively) of the diatonic scale, otherwise symbolized: ii, iii, vi, and vii^{o} (again, respectively). They function as auxiliary or supportive triads to the primary triads.

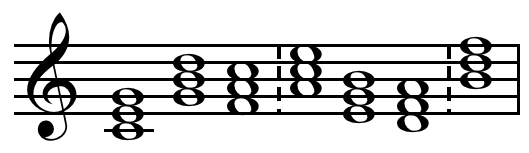
Diatonic functions in hierarchical order in C

In C major these are:

- I C
- V G
- IV F
- vi Am
- iii Em
- ii Dm
- vii^{o} Bdim

In a minor key triads i and iv are minor chords, but in chord V the leading-tone is generally raised to form a major chord. For example, in A minor the primary triads are Am, Dm and E. Chord v (minor) in a minor key might be expected to be a primary triad, but its use is rare in common practice harmony.

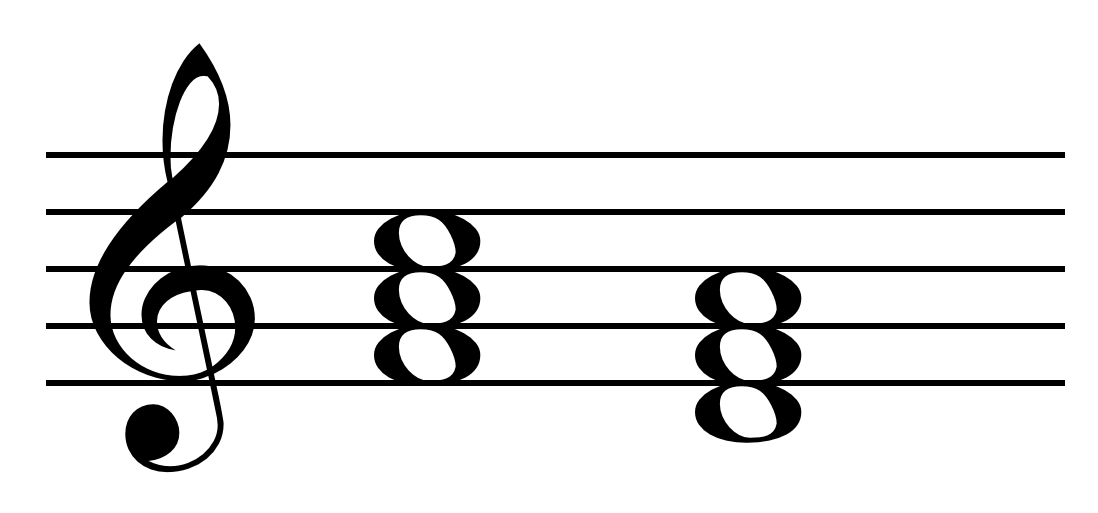
Subdominant and subdominant parallel in C major: FM (IV) and Dm (ii) chords.

Auxiliary chords may be considered parallel and contrast chords derived from the primary triads. For example, the supertonic, ii, is the subdominant parallel, relative of IV (in C: a d minor chord is the subdominant parallel, the subdominant is an F major chord). Being a parallel chord in a major key it is derived through raising the fifth a major second (C of F–A–C rises to D → F–A–D, an inversion of D–F–A). Alternatively, secondary triads may be considered ii, iii, and vi. In C major these are:

- ii Dm
- iii Em
- vi Am

In A minor these are:

- ii^{o} Bdim
- III C
- VI F

== See also ==
- Subsidiary chord
