= Parallel and counter parallel =

Type of chord

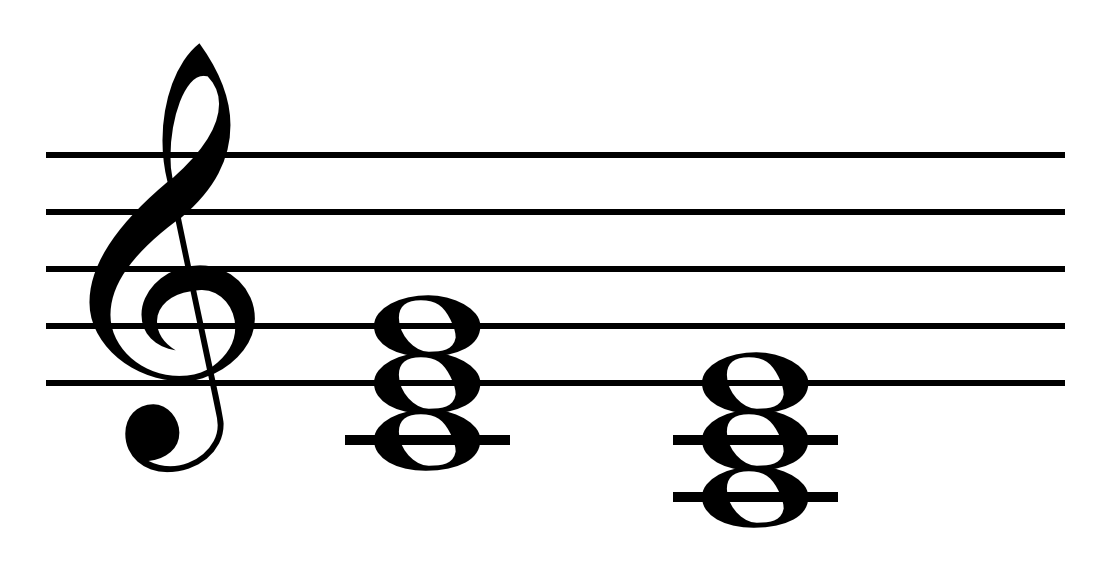
Tonic and tonic parallel in C major: C^{M} and Am chords.

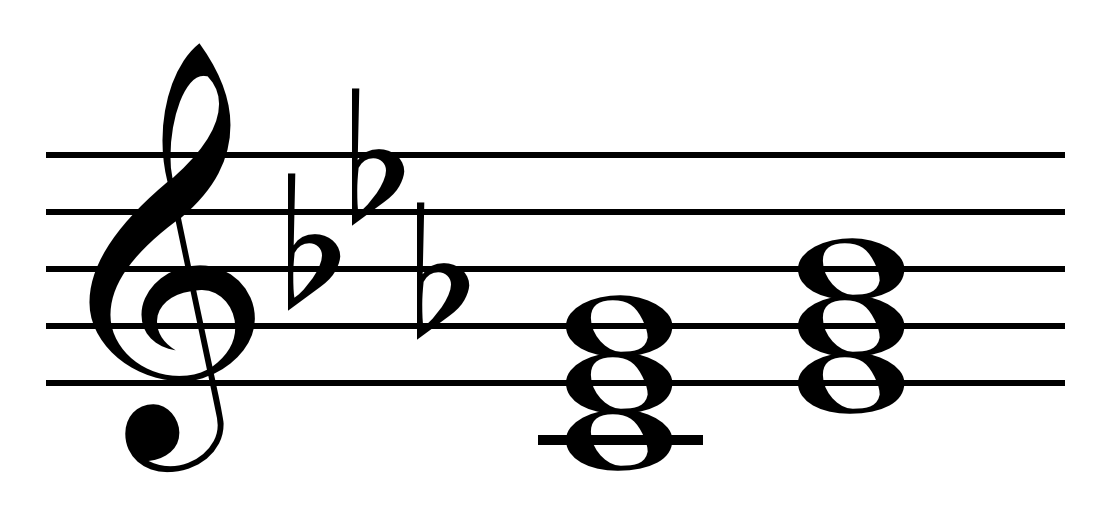
Tonic and tonic parallel in C minor: Cm and E^{♭M} chords.

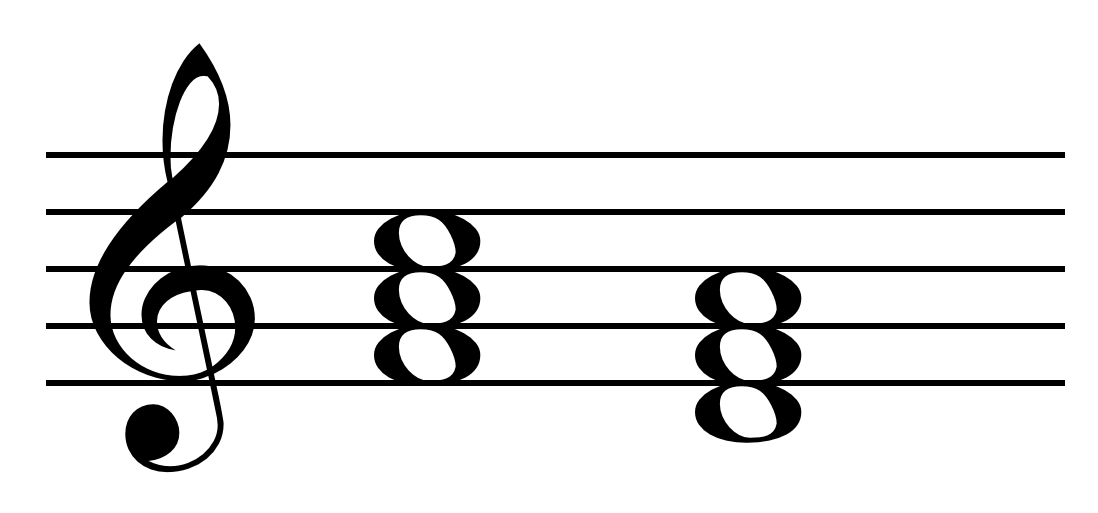
Subdominant and subdominant parallel in C major (Sp): F^{M} and Dm chords.

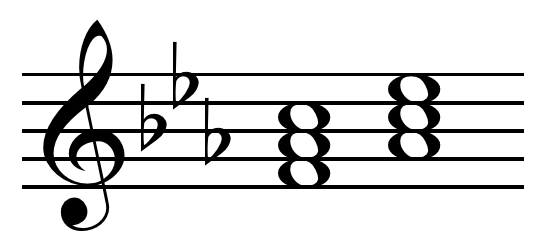
Subdominant and subdominant parallel in C minor (sP): Fm and A^{♭M} chords.

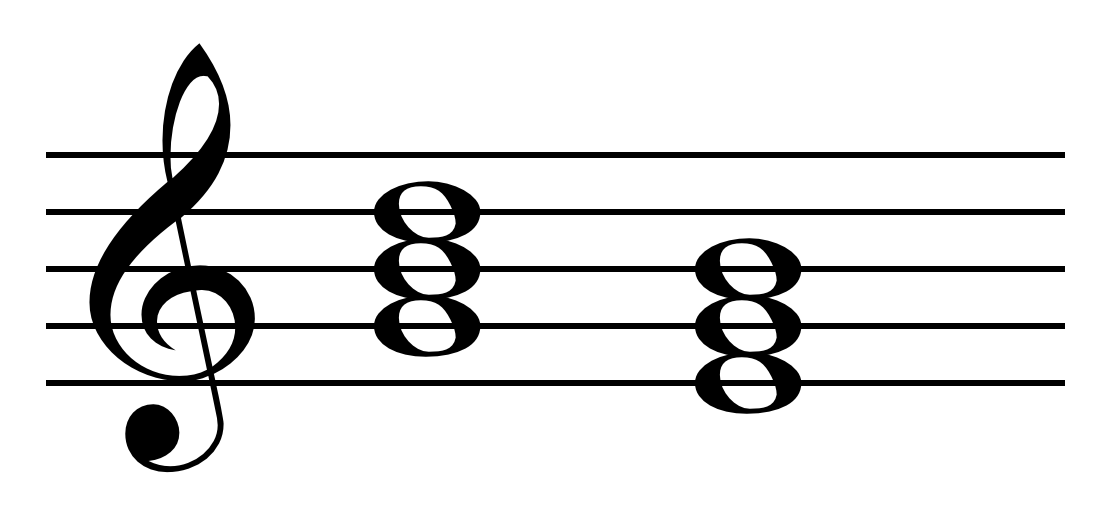
Dominant and dominant parallel in C major: G^{M} and Em chords.

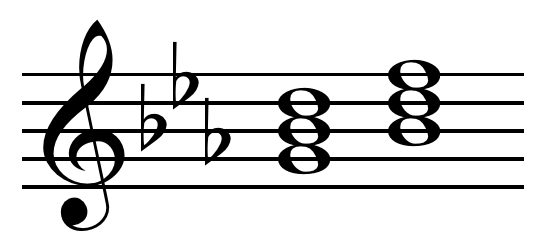
Dominant and dominant parallel in C minor: Gm and B^{♭M} chords.

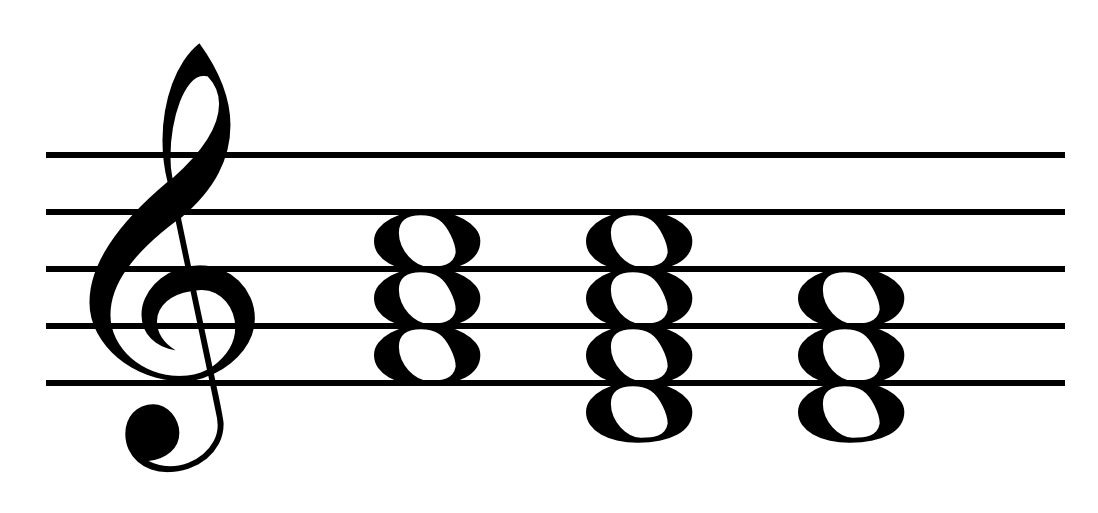
The similarity between the subdominant and supertonic chords is easily seen and heard through the supertonic seventh chord.

Parallel and counter parallel chords are terms derived from the German (Parallelklang, Gegenparallelklang) to denote what is more often called in English the "relative", and possibly the "counter relative" chords. In Hugo Riemann's theory, and in German theory more generally, these chords share the function of the chord to which they link: subdominant parallel, dominant parallel, and tonic parallel. Riemann defines the relation in terms of the movement of one single note:

The substitution of the major sixth for the perfect fifth above in the major triad and below in the minor triad results in the parallel of a given triad. In C major thence arises an apparent A minor triad (Tp, the parallel triad of the tonic, or tonic parallel), D minor triad (Sp), and E minor triad (Dp). (Note: The German text, in the 11th edition of Riemann's Musiklexikon reads: die Sexte des Durakkords und die Untersexte des Moll-akkordes bei fehlender Quinte (für diese eintretend), ergibt den für den betreffenden Klang innerhalb der Tonart stellvertretenden Parallelklang. In C dur entstehen so scheinbar der A moll-Akkord (Tp, d. h. Parallelklang der Tonika, Tonikaparallele), D moll-Akkord (SP) und Emoll-Akkord (DP). [literal translation] "The sixth of the major chord and the inferior sixth of the minor chord, substituting for the fifth when it is absent, produce the substituting Parallelklang for the corresponding chord in the tonality. In C major in this way arise the apparent A minor chord (Tp, that is the "parallel" chord of the tonic), D minor chord (Sp), and E minor chord (Dp)."))

For example, the major tonic and tonic parallel and minor tonic and tonic parallel.

| Major | | | Minor | | |
|---|---|---|---|---|---|
| Parallel | Note letter in C | Name | Parallel | Note letter in C | Name |
| Tp | A minor | Submediant | tP | E^{♭} major | Mediant |
| Sp | D minor | Supertonic | sP | A^{♭} major | Submediant |
| Dp | E minor | Mediant | dP | B^{♭} major | Subtonic |

Dp stands for Dominant-parallel. The word "parallel" in German [musical vocabulary] has the [same connotation as] "relative" in English. G major and E minor are called parallel keys. The G major chord and the E minor chord in the key of C major are called parallel chords in the Riemann system. (Note: What is meant here is that, in the key of C major, G major (the dominant) and E minor (the mediant, the relative of the dominant) are "parallel" [relative] to each other. The same could be said of C major and A minor (the tonic and its relative) and of F major and D minor (the subdominant and its relative).)

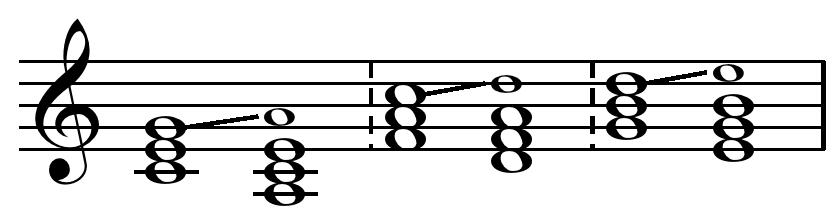

The tonic, subdominant, and dominant chords, in root position, each followed by its parallel. The parallel is formed by raising the fifth a whole tone.

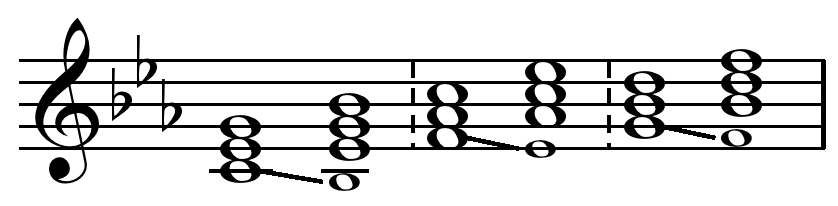

The minor tonic, subdominant, dominant, and their parallels, created by lowering the fifth (German) / root (English) a whole tone.

The parallel chord (but not the counter parallel chord) of a major chord will always be the minor chord whose root is a minor third down from the major chord's root, inversely the parallel chord of a minor chord will be the major chord whose root is a minor third up from the root of the minor chord. Thus, in a major key, where the dominant is a major chord, the dominant parallel will be the minor chord a minor third below the dominant. In a minor key, where the dominant may be a minor chord, the dominant parallel will be the major chord a minor third above the (minor) dominant.

Dr. Riemann ... sets himself to demonstrate that every chord within the key-system has, and must have, either a Tonic, Dominant or Subdominant function or significance. For example, the secondary triad on the sixth degree [submediant] of the scale of C major, a-c-e, or rather c-e-a, is a Tonic 'parallel,' and has a Tonic significance, because the chord represents the C major 'klang,' into which the foreign note a is introduced. This, as we have seen, is the explanation which Helmholtz has given of this minor chord."

— Shirlaw 2010

The name "parallel chord" comes from the German musical theory, where "Paralleltonart" means not "parallel key" but "relative key", and "parallel key" is "Varianttonart".

== Counter parallel ==
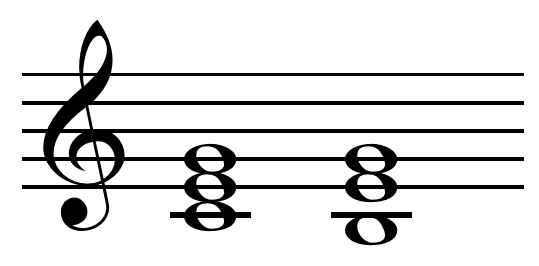
Tonic and tonic counter parallel in C major: C^{M} and Em chords.

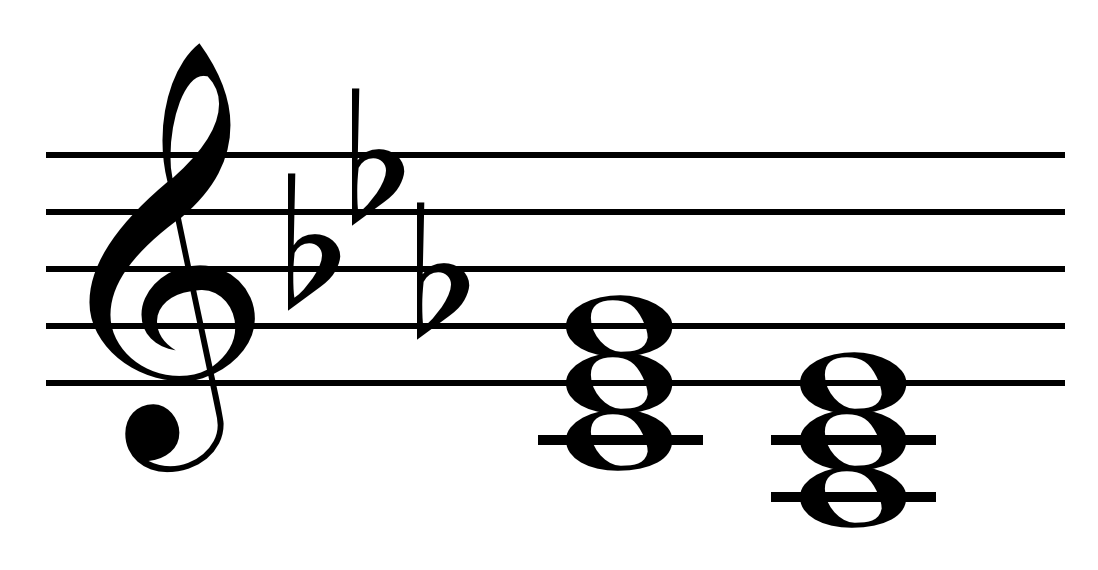
Tonic and tonic counter parallel in C minor: Cm and A^{♭M} chords.

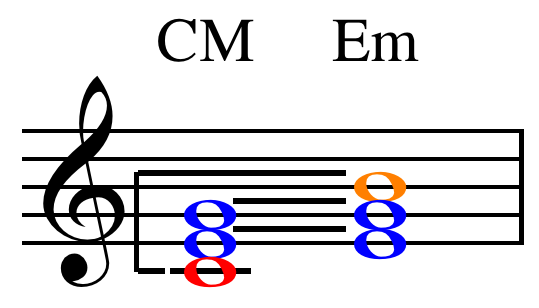
Contrast chord example: C major and E minor contrast through their respective notes C and B (in red and orange), each a half step apart or leading tones. The chords share two notes (in blue) however.

The "counter parallel" or "contrast chord" is terminology used in German theory derived mainly from Hugo Riemann to refer to (US:) relative (German: parallel) diatonic functions and is abbreviated Tcp in major and tCp in minor (Tkp respectively tKp in Riemann's diction). The chord can be seen as the "tonic parallel reversed" and is in a major key the same chord as the dominant parallel (Dp) and in a minor key equal to the subdominant parallel (sP); yet, it has another function. According to Riemann the chord is derived through Leittonwechselklänge (German, literally: "leading-tone changing sounds"), sometimes called gegenklang or "contrast chord", abbreviated Tl in major and tL in minor, or, in German literature, abbreviated Tg in major and tG in minor (standing for "Gegenklang" or "Gegenparallel"). If chords may be formed by raising (major) or lowering (minor) the fifth a whole step ["parallel" or relative chords], they may also be formed by lowering (major) or raising (minor) the root a half-step to wechsel, the leading tone or leitton.

| Major | | | Minor | | |
| Contrast | Note letter in C | Name | Contrast | Note letter in C | Name |
| Tl (Tcp) | E minor | Mediant | tL (tCp) | A^{♭} major | Submediant |
| Sl (Scp) | A minor | Submediant | sL (sCp) | D^{♭} major | Neapolitan chord |
| Dl (Dcp) | B minor | Leading-tone | dL (dCp) | E^{♭} major | Mediant |

The substitution of the leading tone for the prime (from below [<] in major, from above [>] in minor) likewise results ... in the leading-tone change (in C major: T< = E minor, S< = A minor, D< = B minor[!]; in A minor: T> = F major, D> = C major, S> = B major [!].

— Hugo Riemann, "Dissonance", Musik-Lexikon

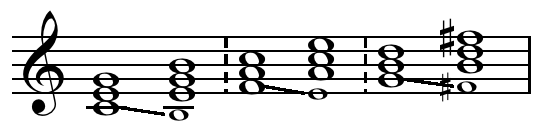

Major Leittonwechselklänge, formed by lowering the root a half step.

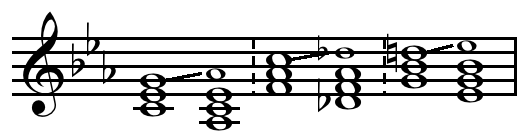

Minor Leittonwechselklänge, formed by raising the root (US) / fifth (German) a half step.

For example, Am is the tonic parallel of C, thus, Em is the counter parallel of C. The usual parallel chord in a major key is a minor third below the root and the counter parallel is a major third above. In a minor key the intervals are reversed: the tonic parallel (e.g. E^{♭} in Cm) is a minor third above, and the counter parallel (e.g. A^{♭} in Cm) is a major third below. Both the parallel and the counter parallel have two notes in common with the tonic (Am and C share C & E; Em and C share E & G).

A chord should be analysed as a Tcp rather than Dp or sP particularly at cadential points, for example at an interrupted cadence, where it substitutes the tonic. It is most easily recognised in a minor key since it creates an ascending semitone step at the end of the cadence by moving from the major dominant chord to the minor counter parallel:

Example
| t - s - D - tCp | Em - Am - B - C | where C is located a major third below Em |
Example
| T - S - D - tCp | F - B^{♭} - C - D^{♭} | where D^{♭} is located a major third below the minor tonic Fm |

In four-part harmony, the Tcp usually has a doubled third to avoid consecutive fifths or octaves. This further emphasises its coherency with the tonic, since the third of the minor key counter parallel is the same as the tonic root which thus is doubled.

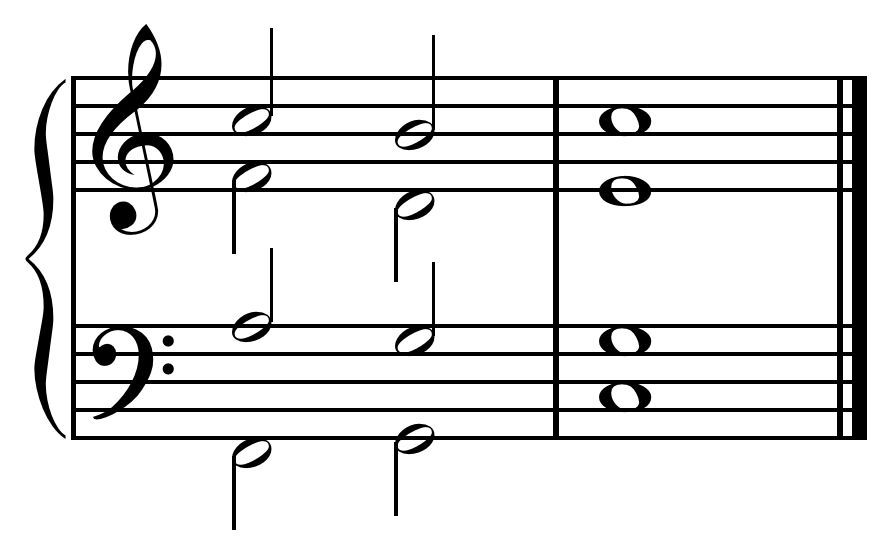
Perfect authentic cadence: IV–V–I progression in C. Considered the strongest ending during the common practice period.

This is clearly not a simple system. Three functional categories can appear in any one of three chordal guises in either of two modes, eighteen possibilities in all: T, Tp, Tl, t, tP, tL, S, Sp, Sl, s, sP, sL, D, Dp, Dl, d, dP, dL. Why all this complexity? Perhaps the central reason is that this ingenious, occasionally convoluted system enabled Riemann to ... [interpret] ostensibly remote triads ... through the traditional terms of the I-IV-V-I, or now T-S-D-T, cadential schema. A sequence of A^{♭} major, B♭ major, and C major chords, for example, could be neatly interpreted as a subdominant (sP) to dominant (dP) to tonic (T) progression in C major, a reading ... not without support in certain late-Romantic cadences.

— Gjerdingen

== See also ==
- Borrowed chord
- Chord substitution
- Chromatic mediant
- Closely related key
- Enharmonic
- Harmonic parallelism
- List of major/minor compositions
- Subsidiary chord
- Voice leading
