= Major scale =

Musical scale comprising seven notes

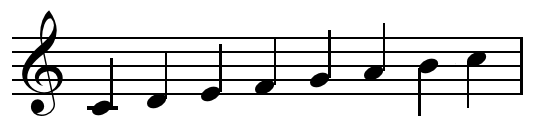
Ascending C major scale.

A major scale is a sequence of musical notes containing a major triad on the tonic.

Most commonly, the term "major scale" refers to the natural major scale (or Ionian mode), which is one of the most commonly used musical scales, especially in Western music. It is one of the diatonic scales. Like many musical scales, it is made up of seven notes: the eighth duplicates the first at double its frequency so that it is called a higher octave of the same note (from Latin "octavus", the eighth). A major scale consists of seven unique note names. They are organized in whole (W) and half (H) steps in the following sequence: W-W-H-W-W-W-H. The first notes is called the tonic and is the pitch the scale is based on. The tonic is repeated at the end of the scale an octave away. The notes C–D–E–F–G–A–B–C form a major scale beginning on C (Do).

Some lesser-used scales are also sometimes called major scales, such as the harmonic major scale, the melodic major scale, and the Lydian and Mixolydian diatonic modes.

== Natural major scale ==
The natural major scale is the diatonic Ionian mode.

Diatonic means that each unique note name (Eng: A B C D E F G) is used once and in order.

The C major scale written below in music notation is the only major scale not requiring sharps or flats. When played on the piano only the white keys are used:

The major scale has a central importance in Western music, particularly that of the common practice period and in popular music.

In Carnatic music, it is known as Sankarabharanam. In Hindustani classical music, it is known as Bilaval.

The pattern of whole and half steps characteristic of a major scale

The sequence of intervals between the notes of a major scale is:

whole, whole, half, whole, whole, whole, half

where "whole" stands for a whole tone or whole step (a red u-shaped curve in the figure), and "half" stands for a semitone or half step (a red angled line in the figure).

Whole steps and half steps are explained mathematically in a related article, Twelfth root of two. Notably, in terms of the sound frequency ratio in equal temperament, a whole tone has twice the sound frequency ratio of a semitone and an octave has twelve half steps (semitones) spaced equally. The sound frequency doubles for corresponding notes from one octave to the next. The ratio is 3/2 = 1.5 for a perfect fifth, for example from C to G on a major scale, and 5/4 = 1.25 for a major third, for example from C to E.

A major scale may be seen as two identical tetrachords separated by a whole tone. Each tetrachord consists of two whole tones followed by a semitone (i.e. whole, whole, half).

The major scale is maximally even.

=== Scale degrees ===
Each note of the major scale has a scale degree name: 1 - Tonic, 2 - Supertonic, 3 - Mediant, 4 - Subdominant, 5 - Dominant, 6 - Submediant, 7 - Leading tone, 8 - Tonic.

=== Harmony of the Major Scale ===
The triads built on each scale degree follow a distinct pattern. The roman numeral analysis is shown in parentheses.

- 1st: major triad (I)
- 2nd: minor triad (ii)
- 3rd: minor triad (iii)
- 4th: major triad (IV)
- 5th: major triad (V)
- 6th: minor triad (vi)
- 7th: diminished triad (vii^{o})

The triads have a root quality chord symbol that are more commonly used. These are the chord names and root quality chord symbols shown in parentheses based on C major scale. Each major scale will have different chord names but the qualities (major minor and diminished) will remain in the same order. For example D major scale's first triad will be D major (D).

- Tonic triad: C major (C)
- Supertonic triad: D minor (Dm)
- Mediant triad: E minor (Em)
- Subdominant triad: F major (F)
- Dominant triad: G major (G)
- Submediant triad: A minor (Am)
- Leading tone triad: B diminished (B^{o})

The seventh chords built on each scale degree follow a distinct pattern. The roman numeral analysis is shown in parentheses.

- 1st: major seventh chord (IM^{7})
- 2nd: minor seventh chord (ii^{7})
- 3rd: minor seventh chord (iii^{7})
- 4th: major seventh chord (IVM^{7})
- 5th: dominant seventh chord (V^{7})
- 6th: minor seventh chord (vi^{7})
- 7th: half-diminished seventh chord (vii^{ø7})

Here are the root quality chord symbols for seventh chords built on the C major scale.

- Tonic seventh chord: C major 7 (Cmaj7, CM7)
- Supertonic seventh chord: D minor 7 (Dm7, Dmin7, D-7)
- Mediant seventh chord: E minor 7 (Em7, Emin7 E-7)
- Subdominant seventh chord: F major 7 (Fmaj7, FM7)
- Dominant seventh chord: G dominant 7 (G7)
- Submediant seventh chord: A minor 7 (Am7, Amin7, A-7)
- Leading tone seventh chord: B half diminished 7 (B^{ø}7), also called B minor 7 flat 5 (Bm7♭5, Bmin7♭5, B-7♭5)

== Major keys and major key signatures ==
If a piece of music (or part of a piece of music) is in a major key, then the notes in the corresponding major scale are considered diatonic notes, while the notes outside the major scale are considered chromatic notes. Moreover, the key signature of the piece of music (or section) will show any sharps or flats in a specific order that are required in the given major scale (key). This key signature then avoids the use of any accidentals needed in the corresponding major scale.

For instance, if a piece of music is in E♭ major, then the seven pitches in the E♭ major scale (E♭, F, G, A♭, B♭, C and D) are considered diatonic pitches, and the other five pitches (E♮, F♯/G♭, A♮, B♮, and C♯/D♭) are considered chromatic pitches. In this case, the key signature will have three flats (B♭, E♭, and A♭).

The figure below shows all 12 relative major and minor keys, with major keys on the outside and minor keys on the inside arranged around the circle of fifths.

No.	Flats		Sharps	
No.	Major	minor	Major	minor
0	C	a	C	a
1	F	d	G	e
2	B♭	g	D	b
3	E♭	c	A	f♯
4	A♭	f	E	c♯
5	D♭	b♭	B	g♯
6	G♭	e♭	F♯	d♯
7	C♭	a♭	C♯	a♯
8	F♭	d♭	G♯	e♯

The numbers inside the circle show the number of sharps or flats in the key signature, with the sharp keys going clockwise, and the flat keys counterclockwise from C major (which has no sharps or flats.) The circular arrangement depends on enharmonic relationships in the circle, usually reckoned at six sharps or flats for the major keys of F♯ = G♭ and D♯ = E♭ for minor keys. Seven sharps or flats make major keys (C♯ major or C♭ major) that may be more conveniently spelled with five flats or sharps (as D♭ major or B major).

=== Key signatures without the circle of 5ths ===
Sharp scales are constructed in a linear way by beginning with C major (no sharps). The next major scale name is the dominant (5th note) of the current scale. In this case G is the dominant of C major. G major has one more sharp than C major. The new sharp for G major is its leading tone (7th note), F♯. This process is repeated until all 7 notes are sharp. The dominant of G major is D, D major will have one additional sharp, its Leading Tone is the added sharp, C♯.

C major No sharps

G major F♯

D major F♯ C♯

A major F♯ C♯ G♯

E major F♯ C♯ G♯ D♯

B major F♯ C♯ G♯ D♯ A♯

F♯ major F♯ C♯ G♯ D♯ A♯ E♯

C♯ major F♯ C♯ G♯ D♯ A♯ E♯ B♯

Flat scales are constructed in a linear way by beginning with C major (no flats). The next major scale name is the subdominant (4th note) of the current scale. In this case F is subdominant of C major. F major has one more flat than C major. The new flat for F major is its Subdominant (4th note) B♭. This process is repeated until all 7 notes are flat. The subdominant of F major is B♭, B♭ major will have one additional flat, its subdominant is the added flat E♭.

C major No flats

F major B♭

B♭ major B♭ E♭

E♭ major B♭ E♭ A♭

A♭ major B♭ E♭ A♭ D♭

D♭ major B♭ E♭ A♭ D♭ G♭

G♭ major B♭ E♭ A♭ D♭ G♭ C♭

C♭ major B♭ E♭ A♭ D♭ G♭ C♭ F♭

== Other forms ==
The major scale has many closely related forms. When the major scale is shifted to a different starting note, the sequence is also known as a mode.

Like the minor scale has natural minor scale, harmonic minor scale, and melodic minor scale, the major scale also has natural major scale, harmonic major scale, and melodic major scale. In the harmonic (major or minor) scale, the 6th tone to the 7th tone is an augmented second, and in the melodic (major or minor) scale, the ascending and descending are different: the ascending is raised by one semitone than the descending.

Scales with a major tonic triad are often referred to as major. Besides the Ionian mode, there are two more major diatonic modes: the Lydian mode and the Mixolydian mode.

The harmonic major scale has a minor sixth. It differs from the harmonic minor scale only by raising the third degree.

The melodic major scale is the combined scale that goes as Ionian ascending and as Aeolian dominant descending. It differs from melodic minor scale only by raising the third degree to a major third.

The double harmonic major scale has a minor second and a minor sixth. It is the fifth mode of the Hungarian minor scale.

Gapped scales can also be considered incomplete major or minor scales. The pentatonic scale can appear in a major guise.

== See also ==
- Ionian mode
- Major and minor

No.	Flats		Sharps	
No.	Major	minor	Major	minor
0	C	a	C	a
1	F	d	G	e
2	B♭	g	D	b
3	E♭	c	A	f♯
4	A♭	f	E	c♯
5	D♭	b♭	B	g♯
6	G♭	e♭	F♯	d♯
7	C♭	a♭	C♯	a♯
8	F♭	d♭	G♯	e♯
