= Chordboard =

Musical instrument

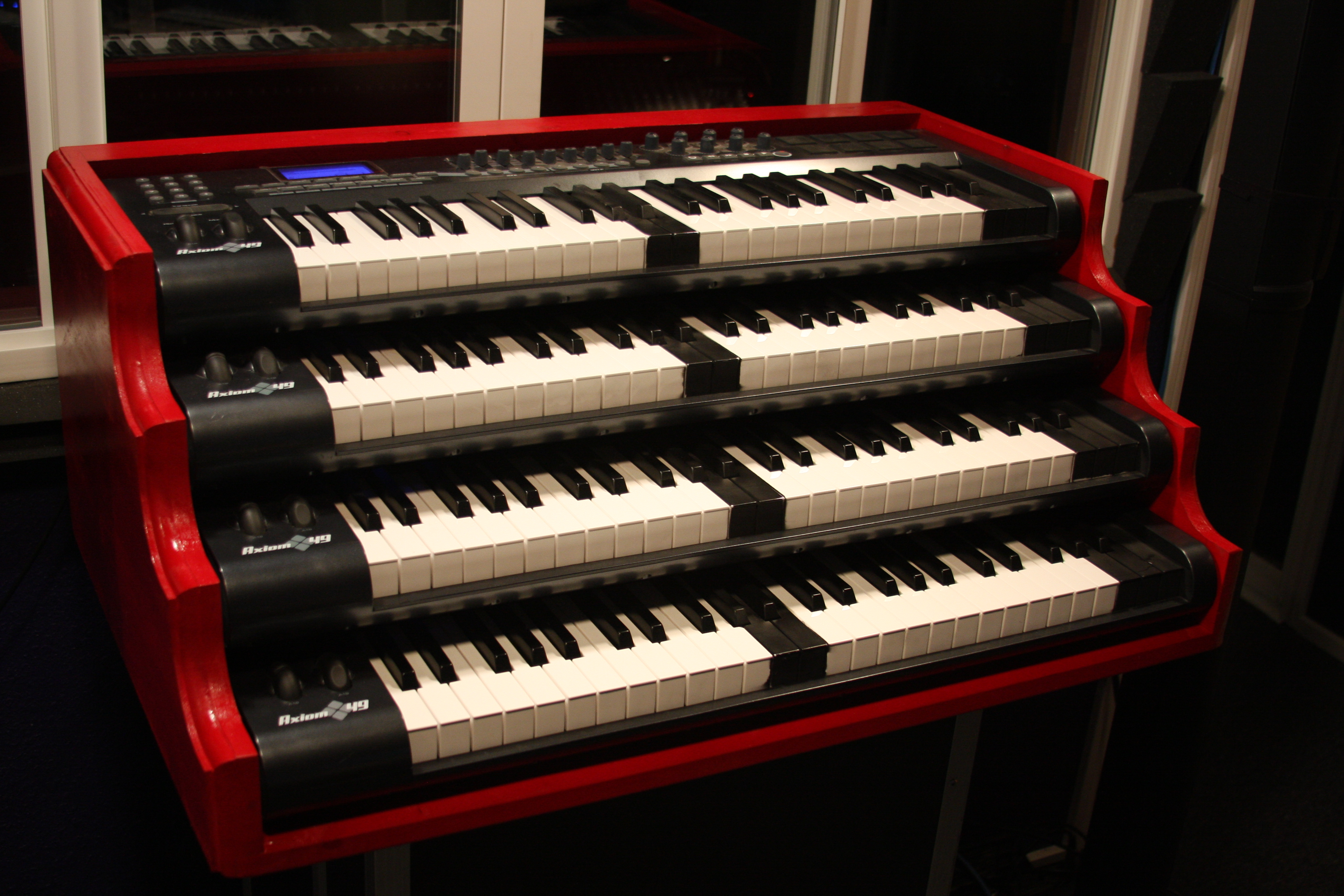
Phase 1 Chordboard STAC prototype

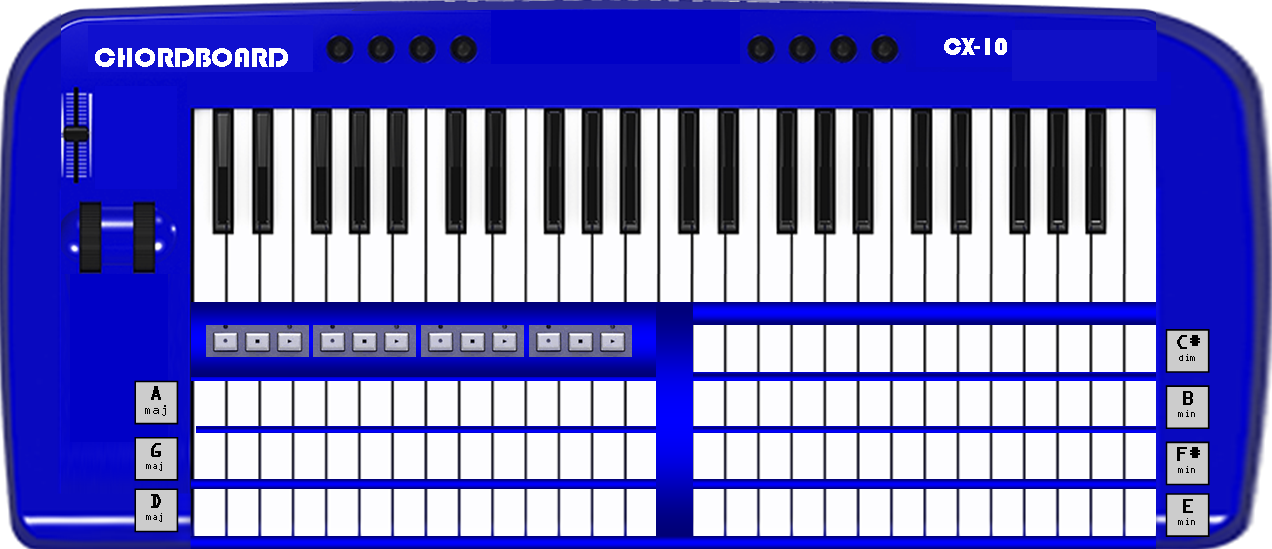
Phase 2 Chordboard conceptual drawing

The chordboard is an electronic musical instrument based on software, and played by a keyboard controller. One implementation is a set of four MIDI keyboards arranged vertically. The patent for this musical technology obtained by Grant Johnson, inventor, in 1995, specifically identifies the seven chords that exist for each key signature, and how these key signatures can be selected at any time while playing the instrument to achieve a key signature change, and thus an instant change in chords. In every key signature there are seven chords, and each of these chords are identified on the chordboard as follows (signified by the Nashville Number System):

- I chord is major tonality, referred to as ROOT CHORD
- ii chord is minor tonality, referred to as SUPER TONIC CHORD
- iii chord is minor tonality, referred to as MEDIANT CHORD
- IV chord is minor tonality, referred to as SUB-DOMINANT CHORD
- V chord is minor tonality, referred to as DOMINANT CHORD
- vi chord is minor tonality, referred to as SUB-MEDIANT CHORD
- vii chord is minor tonality, referred to as LEADING TONE CHORD

Pressing a key on any one of the chordboard's four keyboards sounds a single note within the chord zone. Each key plays only one note. To play a chord, the musician plays two or more keys, similar to a piano.

== History ==
The chordboard original started as a prototype stand alone self-contained unit created by Grant Johnson (inventor/musician), but evolved into a software based musical instrument that could work with a variety of hardware devices, as music technology has continually evolved centered around a DAW. With the advent of readily available Digital Audio Workstation (DAW) easily accessible to the consumer masses on account of much lower cost options (with some being freely available i.e. Audacity), the chordboard can be configured using any type of MIDI keyboard connected via USB to a Mac or PC computer. The Chordboard evolved to a set of vertically stacked keyboards and was dubbed the Chordboard STAC, consisting of four midi controller keyboards (61 keys each) and where the black keys were disabled in software and only the white keys were mapped to various harmonic notes within the chord, depending on genre. For instance, in a JAZZ genre, the STAC would utilize chord voicings that were compatible with larger chords such as the 9th, 11th, and 13th. The STAC allowed for key changes, genre changes, on the fly by a programmable section of keys on the top keyboard. All seven chords within any key signature selected were represented by the STAC (see photo).

== Functionality ==
Large symphonic chord voicings can be played on the chordboard with 12 notes available for each of the seven chord zones (84 active notes total). Each white key on the MIDI keyboard used represents an individual note within a chord zone, and is mapped to a note within a harmonic chord voicing pattern programmed for each chord, according to major-minor tonality and a particular voicing style (such as classic, jazz, or oriental). Due to the chord voicing mapping that takes place within the software, the entry level learning curve is short. In contrast, because of the millions of possible chord voicings between each of the seven chords in a key signature, more advanced level playing technique can take place, but over a much longer period of time.

The chordboard interface is made up of 7 different active chords, with the option to change chord values based on every possible key signature variation (24 unique sets of key signatures, 12 major and 12 minor each in the keys of C, Db, D, Eb, E, F, Gb, G, Ab, A, Bb, B). Each chord value can instantly change, depending on which key signature the player selects from the top keyboard in the stack of four MIDI keyboards. For example, in the Key of C, the I chord is C major, and the II chord is D minor, and so on up the scale. The chordboard allows the player to select key signature changes on the fly, and chord style, or genre changes also on the fly, facilitating a vast variety of chord voicings available for each chord.

The Chordboard STAC functionality is explained visually in the following video: HOW to Play the Chordboard STAC

Sample songs created with the STAC include:

Music in my Soul

Meso Kingman

Ballad of Bordeaux

STACSOUNDS AFRICANA © 2009
