= Triad (music) =

Three notes in intervals of a third

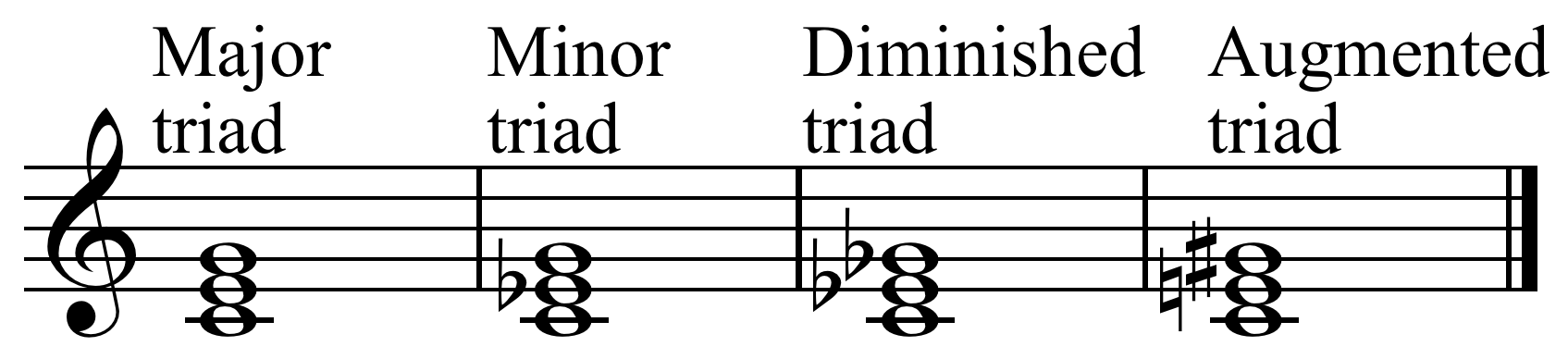
Types of triads: I, i, i^{o}, I^{+}

In music, a triad is a set of three notes (or "pitch classes") that can be stacked vertically in thirds. Triads are the most common chords in Western music.

When stacked in thirds, notes produce triads. The triad's members, from lowest-pitched tone to highest, are called:

- the root
  - Note: Inversion does not change the root. (The third or fifth can be the lowest note.)
- the third – its interval above the root being a minor third (three semitones) or a major third (four semitones)
- the fifth – its interval above the third being a minor third or a major third, hence its interval above the root being a diminished fifth (six semitones), perfect fifth (seven semitones), or augmented fifth (eight semitones). Perfect fifths are the most commonly used interval above the root in Western classical, popular and traditional music.

Some 20th-century theorists, notably Howard Hanson, Carlton Gamer, and Joseph Schillinger expand the term to refer to any combination of three different pitches, regardless of the intervals. Schillinger defined triads as "A structure in harmony of but three parts; conventionally, but not necessarily, the familiar triad of ordinary diatonic harmony." The word used by other theorists for this more general concept is "trichord". Others use the term to refer to combinations apparently stacked by other intervals, as in "quartal triad"; a combination stacked in thirds is then called a "tertian triad".

The root of a triad, together with the degree of the scale to which it corresponds, primarily determine its function. Secondarily, a triad's function is determined by its quality: major, minor, diminished or augmented. Major and minor triads are the most commonly used triad qualities in Western classical, popular and traditional music. In standard tonal music, only major and minor triads can be used as a tonic in a song or some other piece of music. That is, a song or other vocal or instrumental piece can be in the key of C major or A minor, but a song or some other piece cannot be in the key of B diminished or F augmented (although songs or other pieces might include these triads within the triad progression, typically in a temporary, passing role). Three of these four kinds of triads are found in the major (or diatonic) scale. In popular music and 18th-century classical music, major and minor triads are considered consonant and stable, and diminished and augmented triads are considered dissonant and unstable.

When we consider musical works we find that the triad is ever-present and that the interpolated dissonances have no other purpose than to effect the continuous variation of the triad.

— Lorenz Mizler (1739)

== History ==
In the late Renaissance music era, and especially during the Baroque music era (1600–1750), Western art music shifted from a more "horizontal" contrapuntal approach (in which multiple, independent melody lines were interwoven) toward progressions, which are sequences of triads. The progression approach, which was the foundation of the Baroque-era basso continuo accompaniment, required a more "vertical" approach, thus relying more heavily on the triad as the basic building block of functional harmony.

The primacy of the triad in Western music was first theorized by Gioseffo Zarlino (1500s), and the term "harmonic triad" was coined by Johannes Lippius in his Synopsis musicae novae (1612).

== Construction ==
Triads (or any other tertian chords) are built by superimposing every other note of a diatonic scale (e.g., standard major or minor scale). For example, a C major triad uses the notes C–E–G. This spells a triad by skipping over D and F. While the interval from each note to the one above it is a third, the quality of those thirds varies depending on the quality of the triad:

- major triads contain a major third and perfect fifth interval, symbolized: R 3 5 (or 0–4–7 as semitones)
- minor triads contain a minor third, and perfect fifth, symbolized: R ♭3 5 (or 0–3–7)
- diminished triads contain a minor third, and diminished fifth, symbolized: R ♭3 ♭5 (or 0–3–6)
- augmented triads contain a major third, and augmented fifth, symbolized: R 3 ♯5 (or 0–4–8)

The above definitions spell out the interval of each note above the root. Since triads are constructed of stacked thirds, they can be alternatively defined as follows:

- major triads contain a major third with a minor third stacked above it, e.g., in the major triad C–E–G (C major), the interval C–E is major third and E–G is a minor third.
- minor triads contain a minor third with a major third stacked above it, e.g., in the minor triad A–C–E (A minor), A–C is a minor third and C–E is a major third.
- diminished triads contain two minor thirds stacked, e.g., B–D–F (B diminished)
- augmented triads contain two major thirds stacked, e.g., D–F♯–A♯ (D augmented).

Triads appear in close or open positions. "When the three upper voices are as close together as possible, the spacing is described as close position or close harmony. [...] The other arrangements [...] are called open position or open harmony."

== Function ==
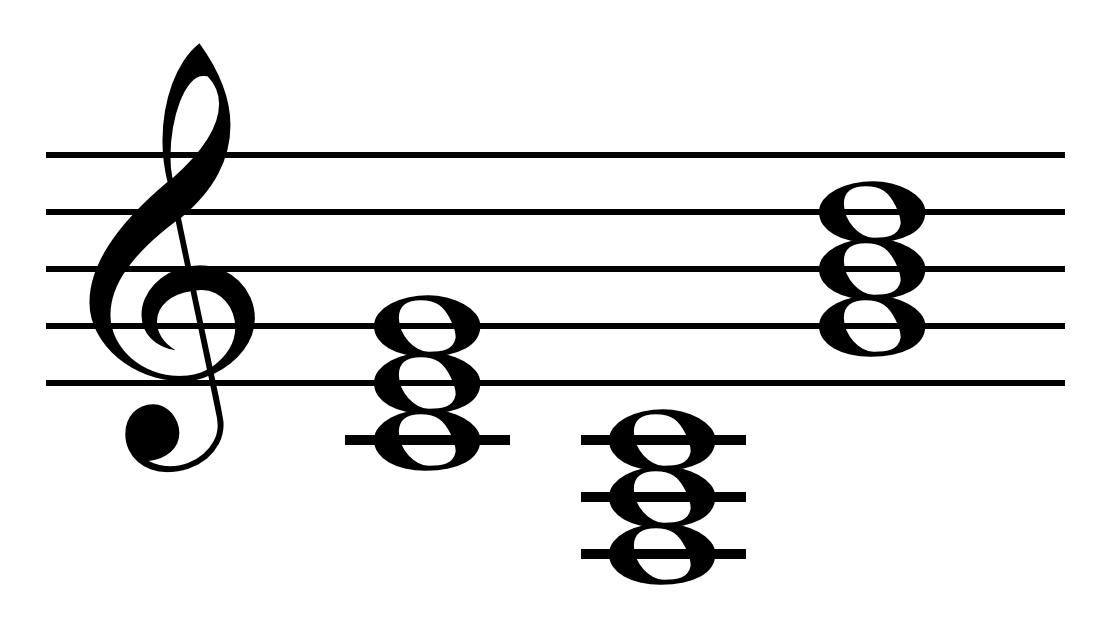
Primary triads in C

Each triad found in a diatonic (single-scale-based) key corresponds to a particular diatonic function. Functional harmony tends to rely heavily on the primary triads: triads built on the tonic, subdominant, and dominant degrees. The roots of these triads are the first, fourth, and fifth degrees (respectively) of the diatonic scale, and the triads are accordingly symbolized I, IV, and V. Primary triads "express function clearly and unambiguously." The other triads in diatonic keys include the supertonic, mediant, submediant, and leading-tone, whose roots are the second, third, sixth, and seventh degrees (respectively) of the diatonic scale, symbolized ii, iii, vi, and vii^{o}. They function as auxiliary or supportive triads to the primary triads.

== See also ==
- Upper structure triad
