= AP Music Theory =

Advanced Placement course and exam

Logo of AP Music Theory as of 2025

Advanced Placement (AP) Music Theory (also known as AP Music or AP Theory) is a course and examination offered in the United States by the College Board as part of the Advanced Placement Program to high school students who wish to earn credit for a college-level music theory course.

== Course ==
Some of the material covered in the course involves sight reading, in-depth terminology, musical phrasing and musical composition, music history, chord structure, cadences, musical texture, and other areas of music theory. In addition, part-writing is an integral part of the course, as it takes up half of the 8 units covered. This course is recommended for students with particularly strong abilities in music, or students planning to pursue college music majors.

== Exam ==
The exam itself is divided into two broad sections: Section I, the multiple-choice section, and Section II, the free-response section. In turn, each section is divided into parts.

=== Section I – multiple choice ===
Section I of the exam consists of four-option multiple choice questions; the total number varies each year. The first half of the section is listening-based; the proctor will begin playing a provided CD, and the exam will begin. Each question or group of questions is based on a musical selection or an auditory stimulus. The selection or stimulus is played, and the student must answer as many of the questions as possible. Each musical selection or auditory stimulus is usually played two to four times for each question or group of questions, though the exact number differs from question to question.

=== Section II – free response ===
Section II of the exam consists of three parts, all of which require student-produced responses. One part of the section is listening-based, one part is part-writing, and one part is sight-singing.

The listening-based part of the section contains two types of questions. The first is melodic dictation, in which a one-part melody is played two or three times while a starting pitch, time signature, and key are given on the answer sheet, and the student must accurately record both the pitch and value of the played notes. The student must record two melodies; generally, one melody is in a major key and in a compound meter, while the other melody is in a minor key and in a simple meter. One melody is written in the treble clef and the other is in the bass clef. The reason for this is to test AP Music Theory students in their ability to distinguish between simple and compound time signatures, as well as being able to read bass clef and treble clef.

The second type of listening-based question is harmonic dictation. A four-part texture, utilizing SATB, is played four times. The key, starting pitch for each part, and time signature are given on the answer sheet. The student must accurately notate only the bass and soprano lines, though the bass, tenor, alto, and soprano parts are all played in the recording. The student must also provide a Roman numeral analysis of the chords in the progression with correct chord inversions.

The part-writing part of section II requires that the student—using knowledge of "eighteenth century composition guidelines" (as indicated on CollegeBoard's latest rubric and on the released 2003-2006 exams on AP Central), standard circle-of-fifths chord progressions, cadences, voicing, and part ranges—write a short two-part or four-part texture given starting pitch, key, time signature, and more information that varies with each question. Students may be given such frameworks as figured bass notation, a completed bass part, Roman numerals, or a completed soprano line.

For questions with supplied figured bass notation and completed bass line, the student must write the Roman numeral notation of each chord and fill in the remaining tenor, alto, and soprano lines. For the question with the supplied Roman numeral notation, the student must write all four (SATB) parts of the texture. For the question with the supplied soprano line, the student must develop a chord progression based on the given soprano line and write only an accompanying bass part.

The sight-singing part of the exam requires the student to analyze a given melodic line and perform the line as accurately as possible. Students perform two melodies, one at a time. The written starting pitch will be played, and the student will have 75 seconds to practice aloud any parts that he or she desires. Once the 75 seconds have elapsed, the student will have 60 seconds to perform the piece. Transposition of the key is allowed for voice comfort as stated on each year's directions. As with the melodic dictation part of the exam, one piece will generally be compound in meter and major in key, while the other will be simple in meter and minor in key. Students may sing the melody using solfège syllables, numbers, or any other neutral syllable (la, ta, na, etc.).

=== Grade distribution ===
The grade distributions for the AP Music Theory exam since 2010 are:

| Score | 2010 | 2011 | 2012 | 2013 | 2014 | 2015 | 2016 | 2017 | 2018 | 2019 | 2020 | 2021 | 2022 | 2023 | 2024 | 2025 | 2026 |
|---|---|---|---|---|---|---|---|---|---|---|---|---|---|---|---|---|---|
| 5 | 19.5% | 17.5% | 19.3% | 18.8% | 19.8% | 19.1% | 18.2% | 19.2% | 22.5% | 21.2% | 24.2% | 19.9% | 18.7% | 19.8% | 19.0% | 18.8% | 18% |
| 4 | 17.4% | 17.5% | 17.4% | 16.6% | 17.5% | 17.2% | 17.3% | 17.2% | 18.9% | 17.9% | 19.3% | 18.1% | 17.7% | 16.9% | 17.5% | 18.0% | 17% |
| 3 | 23.7% | 24.2% | 24.9% | 25.6% | 25.4% | 24.8% | 24.1% | 24.7% | 24.6% | 24.5% | 25.7% | 23.2% | 26.5% | 24.0% | 23.6% | 24.7% | 24% |
| 2 | 26.4% | 26.7% | 25.1% | 25.0% | 24.2% | 24.8% | 26.0% | 24.6% | 22.4% | 23.5% | 22.0% | 23.2% | 23.7% | 24.1% | 25.3% | 24.7% | 26% |
| 1 | 13.0% | 14.0% | 13.3% | 13.9% | 13.2% | 14.1% | 14.4% | 14.3% | 11.6% | 12.8% | 8.8% | 15.6% | 14.4% | 15.2% | 14.5% | 14.7% | 15% |
| % of scores 3 or higher | 60.6% | 59.2% | 61.6% | 61.0% | 62.7% | 61.1% | 59.6% | 61.1% | 66.0% | 63.7% | 69.2% | 61.2% | 61.9% | 60.7% | 60.2% | 60.5% | 59% |
| Mean | 3.04 | 2.98 | 3.04 | 3.01 | 3.07 | 3.03 | 2.99 | 3.02 | 3.18 | 3.11 | 3.28 | 3.04 | 3.03 | 3.02 | 3.01 | 3.01 | |
| Standard deviation | 1.32 | 1.30 | 1.31 | 1.31 | 1.31 | 1.32 | 1.32 | 1.33 | 1.32 | 1.33 | 1.29 | 1.35 | 1.32 | 1.34 | 1.33 | 1.33 | |
| Number of students | 17,267 | 18,124 | 18,161 | 18,192 | 17,856 | 18,642 | 18,971 | 19,215 | 19,018 | 18,864 | 16,550 | 16,271 | 15,594 | 17,834 | 19,045 | 17,799 | 18,000 |

== See also ==
- Music
- Glossary of musical terminology
