= Function (music) =

Musical term

In music, function (also harmonic function or tonal function) denotes the relationship of a chord or scale degree to a tonal centre. Two main theories of tonal functions exist today:

- The German theory created by Hugo Riemann in his Vereinfachte Harmonielehre of 1893, which soon became an international success (English and Russian translations in 1896, French translation in 1899), and which is the theory of functions properly speaking. Riemann identified three abstract tonal "functions"—tonic, dominant and subdominant—denoted by the letters T, D, and S, respectively, each of which could take on a more or less modified appearance in any chord of the scale. This theory, in several revised forms, remains much in use for the pedagogy of harmony and analysis in German-speaking countries and in Northern and Eastern European countries.
- The Viennese theory, characterized by the use of Roman numerals to denote the chords of the tonal scale, as developed by Simon Sechter, Arnold Schoenberg, Heinrich Schenker, and others, practiced today in Western Europe and the United States. This theory in origin was not explicitly about tonal functions. It considers the relation of the chords to their tonic in the context of harmonic progressions, often following the cycle of fifths. That this actually describes what could be termed the chords' "function" is evident in Schoenberg's Structural Functions of Harmony (1954), a short treatise dealing mainly with harmonic progressions in the context of a general "monotonality".

Both theories find part of their inspiration in the theories of Jean-Philippe Rameau, starting with his Traité d'harmonie (1722). Even if the concept of harmonic function was not so named before 1893, it can be shown to exist, explicitly or implicitly, in many theories of harmony before that date. Early usages of the term in music (not necessarily in the sense implied here, or only vaguely so) include those by Fétis (Traité complet de la théorie et de la pratique de l'harmonie, 1844), Durutte (Esthétique musicale, 1855), and Loquin (Notions élémentaires d'harmonie moderne, 1862).

The idea of function has been extended further and is sometimes used to translate Antique concepts, such as dynamis in Ancient Greece or qualitas in medieval Latin.

== Origins of the concept ==
The concept of harmonic function originates in theories about just intonation. It was realized that three perfect major triads, distant from each other by a perfect fifth, produced the seven degrees of the major scale in one of the possible forms of just intonation: for instance, the triads F–A–C, C–E–G, and G–B–D (subdominant, tonic, and dominant respectively) produce the seven notes of the major scale. These three triads were soon considered the most important chords of the major tonality, with the tonic in the center, the dominant above, and the subdominant below.

This symmetric construction may have been one of the reasons the fourth degree of the scale, and the chord built on it, were named "subdominant", i.e. the "dominant under [the tonic]". It also is one of the origins of the dualist theories that describe not only the scale in just intonation as a symmetric construction, but also the minor tonality as an inversion of the major one. Dualist theories are documented from the 16th century onward.

== German functional theory ==
The term "functional harmony" derives from Riemann and particularly from his Harmony Simplified. Riemann's direct inspiration was Moritz Hauptmann's dialectic description of tonality. Riemann identified three abstract functions: the tonic, the dominant (its upper fifth), and the subdominant (its lower fifth). He also considered the minor scale the inversion of the major scale, so that the dominant was the fifth above the tonic in major, but below the tonic in minor; the subdominant, similarly, was the fifth below the tonic (or the fourth above) in major, and the reverse in minor.

Despite their complexity, Riemann's ideas had huge impact, especially where German influence was strong. A good example are Hermann Grabner's textbooks. More recent German theorists have abandoned the most complex aspect of Riemann's theory, the dualist conception of major and minor, and consider the dominant the fifth degree above the tonic and the subdominant the fourth degree in both minor and major.

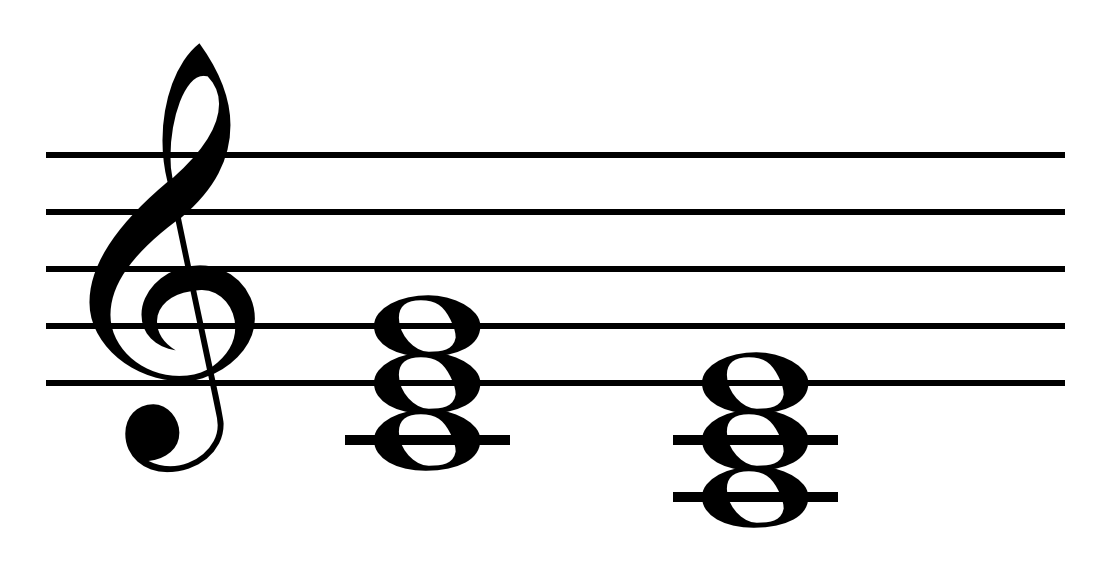
Tonic and its relative (German Parallel, Tp) in C major: CM and Am chords.

In Diether de la Motte's version of the theory, the three tonal functions are denoted by the letters T, D and S, for Tonic, Dominant and Subdominant respectively; the letters are uppercase for functions in major (T, D, S) and lowercase for functions in minor (t, d, s). Each function can in principle be fulfilled by three chords: the main chord corresponding to the function and the chords a third lower and a third higher, as indicated by additional letters. An additional letter P or p indicates that the function is fulfilled by the relative (German Parallel) of its main triad: for instance Tp for the minor relative of the major tonic (e.g., A minor for C major), tP for the major relative of the minor tonic (e.g. E♭ major for c minor), etc. The other triad a third apart from the main one may be denoted by an additional G or g for Gegenparallelklang or Gegenklang ("counterrelative"), for instance tG for the major counterrelative of the minor tonic (e.g. A♭ major for C minor).

Triads a third apart differ from each other by one note only, the other two being shared. In addition, within the diatonic scale, triads a third apart necessarily are of opposite mode. In the simplified theory where the functions in major and minor are on the same scale degrees, the possible functions of triads on degrees I to VII of the scale could be summarized as in the table below (degrees II in minor and VII in major, diminished fifths in the diatonic scale, are considered chords without fundamentals). Chords on III and VI may have the same function as those a third above or a third below, but one of these two is less frequent than the other, as indicated by parentheses.

	Degree	I	II	III	IV	V	VI	VII
Function	in major	T	Sp	Dp / (Tg)	S	D	Tp / (Sg)	
Function	in minor	t		tP / (dG)	s	d	sP / tG	dP

In each case, the chord's mode is denoted by the final letter: for instance, Sp for II in major indicates that II is the minor relative (p) of the major subdominant (S). The major VIth degree in minor is the only one where both functions, sP (major relative of the minor subdominant) and tG (major counterparallel of the minor tonic), are equally plausible. Other signs (not discussed here) are used to denote altered chords, chords without fundamentals, applied dominants, etc. Degree VII in harmonic sequence (e.g. I–IV–VII–III–VI–II–V–I) may be denoted by its roman numeral; in major, the sequence would then be denoted by T–S–VII–Dp–Tp–Sp–D–T.

As summarized by Vincent d'Indy (1903), who shared Riemann's conception:

1. There is only one chord, a perfect chord; it alone is consonant because it alone generates a feeling of repose and balance;
2. this chord has two different forms, major and minor, depending on whether it is composed of a minor third over a major third or a major third over a minor;
3. this chord is able to take on three different tonal functions—tonic, dominant, or subdominant.

== Viennese theory of degrees ==
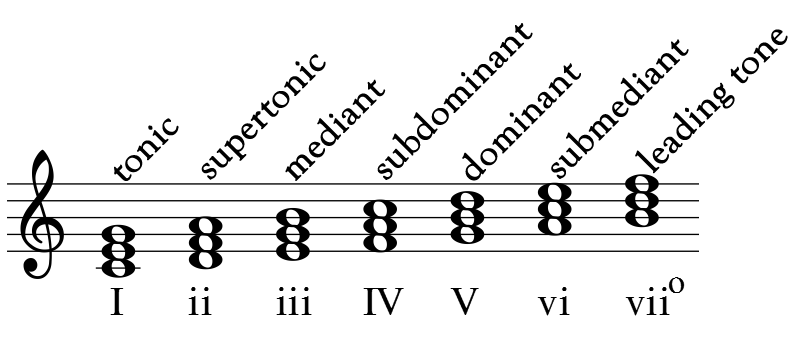
The seven scale degrees in C major with their respective triads and Roman numeral notation

According to the Viennese theory, the "theory of degrees" (Stufentheorie), represented by Simon Sechter, Heinrich Schenker, and Arnold Schoenberg, among others, each scale degree has its own function and refers to the tonal center through the cycle of fifths; it stresses harmonic progressions above chord quality. In music theory as commonly taught in the US, there are six or seven different functions, depending on whether VII is considered to have an independent function.

Stufentheorie stresses the individuality and independence of the seven harmonic degrees. Moreover, unlike Funktionstheorie, where the primary harmonic model is the I–IV–V–I progression, Stufentheorie leans heavily on the cycle of descending fifths I–IV–VII–III–VI–II–V–I".

— Eytan Agmon

== Comparison of the terminologies ==
The table below compares the English and German terms for the major scale. In English, the scale degrees' names are also the names of their functions as assigned by the Viennese theory, and they remain the same in major and in minor.

Name of scale degree	Roman numeral	Function in German	English translation	German abbreviation
Tonic	I	Tonika	Tonic	T
Supertonic	ii	Subdominantparallele	Relative of the subdominant	Sp
Mediant	iii	Dominantparallele or Tonika-Gegenparallele	Relative of the dominant or Counterrelative of the tonic	Dp/Tg
Subdominant	IV	Subdominante	Subdominant (Predominant)	S
Dominant	V	Dominante	Dominant	D
Submediant	vi	Tonikaparallele	Relative of the tonic	Tp
Leading (tone)	vii°	verkürzter Dominantseptakkord	[Incomplete dominant seventh chord]	diagonally slashed D^{7} (Đ^{7})

Note that ii, iii, and vi are lowercase; this indicates that they are minor chords. The circle symbol in vii° indicates that this chord is a diminished triad.

Robert O. Gjerdingen says:

Some may at first be put off by the overt theorizing apparent in German harmony, wishing perhaps that a choice be made once and for all between Riemann's Funktionstheorie and the older Stufentheorie, or possibly believing that so-called linear theories have settled all earlier disputes. Yet this ongoing conflict between antithetical theories, with its attendant uncertainties and complexities, has special merits. In particular, whereas an English-speaking student may falsely believe that he or she is learning harmony "as it really is," the German student encounters what are obviously theoretical constructs and must deal with them accordingly.

== Contemporary functional harmony ==
Beyond the original German theory, the functions of tonic, dominant, and subdominant have been extrapolated to other chords, in which those with tonic function are most stable and resolved; dominant function, least stable and resolving to the tonic; and subdominant (or pre-dominant) function, somewhere in between and often setting up another chord with dominant function.

Reviewing usage of harmonic theory in American publications, William Caplin writes:

Most North American textbooks identify individual harmonies in terms of the scale degrees of their roots. ... Many theorists understand, however, that the Roman numerals do not necessarily define seven fully distinct harmonies, and they instead propose a classification of harmonies into three main groups of harmonic functions: tonic, dominant, and pre-dominant.

1. Tonic harmonies include the I and VI chords in their various positions.
2. Dominant harmonies include the V and VII chords in their various positions. III can function as a dominant substitute in some contexts (as in the progression V–III–VI).
3. Pre-dominant harmonies include a wide variety of chords: IV, II, ♭II, secondary (applied) dominants of the dominant (such as V^{7}/V), and the various "augmented-sixth" chords. ... The modern North American adaptation of the function theory retains Riemann’s category of tonic and dominant functions but usually reconceptualizes his "subdominant" function into a more all-embracing pre-dominant function.

Caplin adds that there are two main types of pre-dominant harmonies, "those built above the fourth degree of the scale in the bass voice and those derived from the dominant of the dominant (V/V)". The first type includes IV, II^{6} or ♭II^{6}, but also other positions of these, such as IV^{6} or ♭II. The second type groups harmonies that feature the raised-fourth scale degree (♯) functioning as the leading tone of the dominant: VII^{7}/V, V^{6}V, or the three varieties of augmented sixth chords.

== See also ==
- Common practice period – Western music history period (c. 1650 to 1900)
- Constant structure – Music composition and performance technique
- Diatonic and chromatic – Terms in music theory to characterize scales
- Nondominant seventh chord – Diatonic seventh chord without dominant function
- Secondary dominant – Harmonic device in Western music
- Subsidiary chord
- Roman numeral analysis – Use of Roman Numeral symbols in the musical analysis of chords
