= Subsidiary chord =

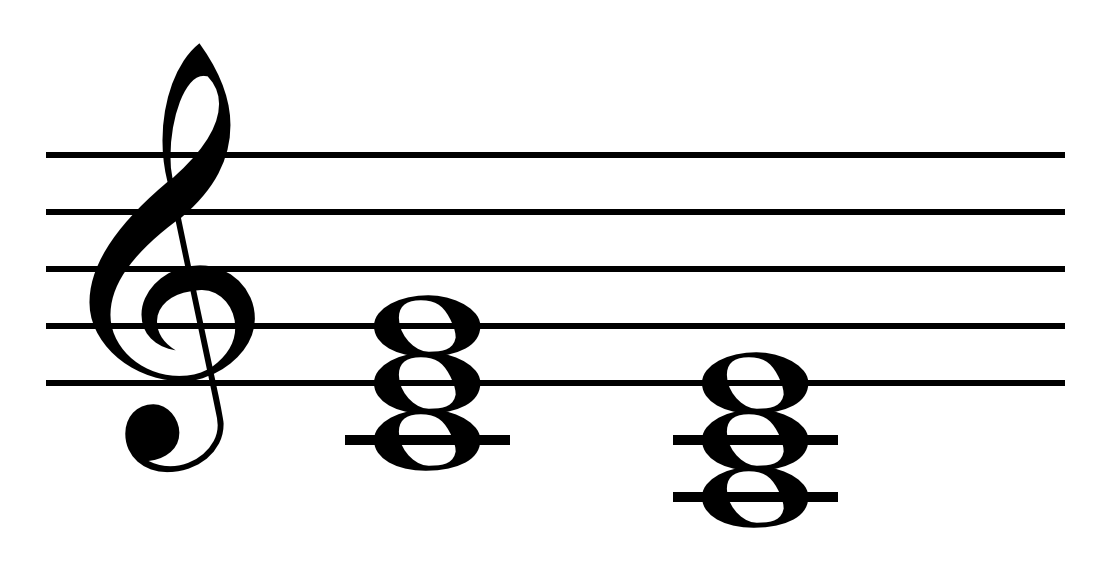
Tonic and tonic parallel in C major: CM and Am chords.

In music and musical analysis, a subsidiary chord is an elaboration of a principal harmonic chord in a chord progression.

If the principal chord (X) is partially replaced by the subsidiary (Y), there are three possible positions - beginning, middle, and end - for the subsidiary:

X–Ya
Y–X
X–Y–X

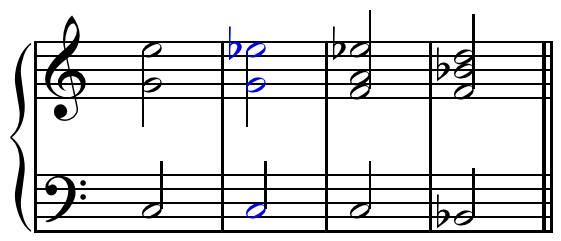
Modulation with subsidiary chord (in blue).

For example, a subsidiary chord in a modulation.

A subsidiary chord may be a chord with related function and/or sharing pitches, for example in E major, C♯m (C♯-E-G♯) as a subsidiary for E (E-G♯-B), which share two of three pitches and are related as tonic parallel (vi) and tonic (I).

== See also ==
- Parallel key
- Primary triad
