= Johannes Lippius =

Alsatian theologian and music theorist (1585–1612)

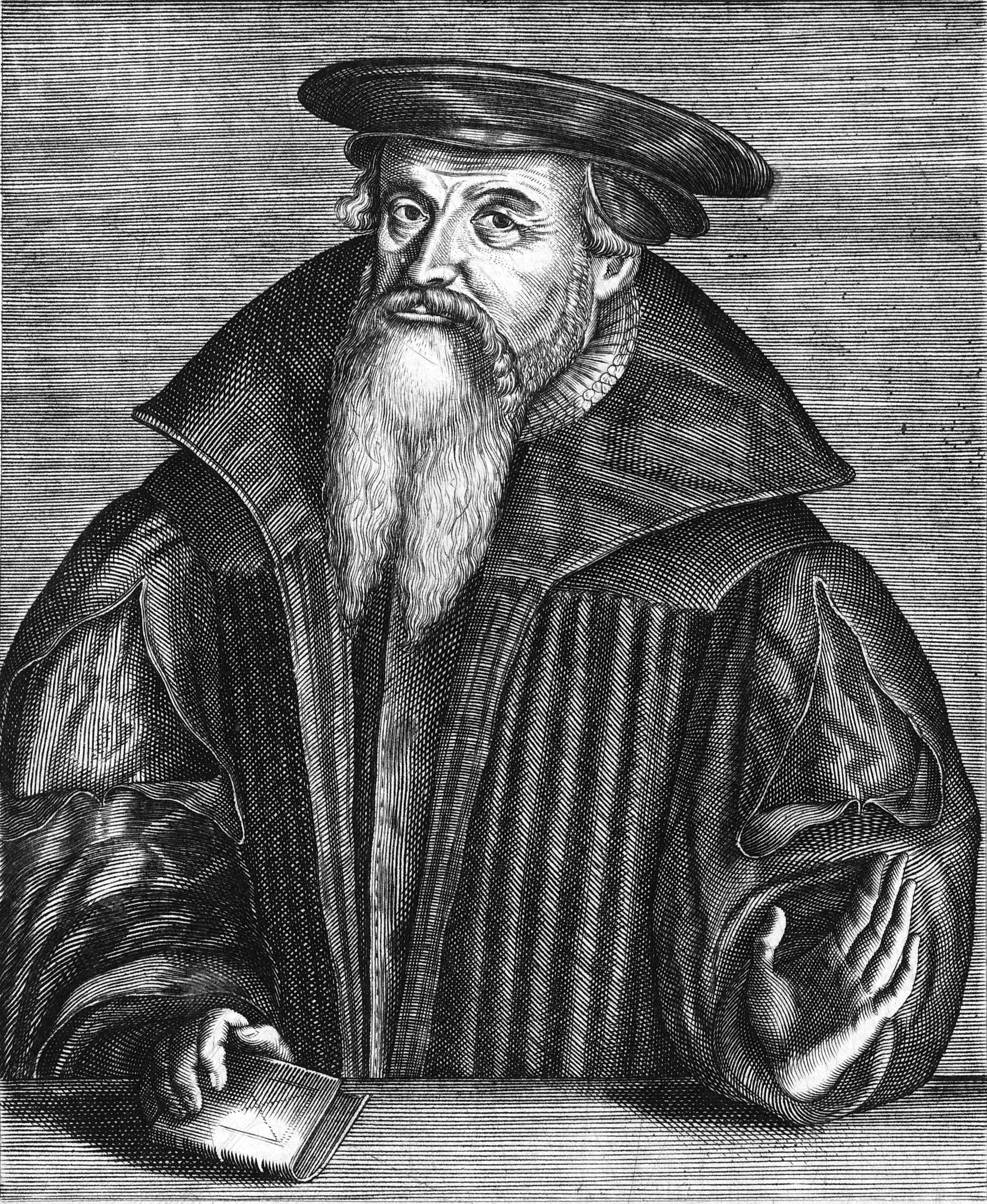
Pastor Johann Lippius (1554–1622) in a 1608 engraving by Jacob van der Heyden

Johannes Lippius (24 June 1585 – 24 September 1612) was an Alsatian theologian and music theorist. He coined the term "harmonic triad" in his Synopsis musicae novae (Synopsis of New Music; 1612).

== Life ==
Lippius was born in Strasbourg, the son of the pastor of St. Peter, Johann Lippius (1554–1622), and his wife Susanna Klehmann. In early childhood, he had already received education in languages and the seven liberal arts, which allowed him to be appointed at the University of Strasbourg to the Master of Philosophy at a young age. By his twenty-first birthday he had given private and university lectures, after which he entered the University of Leipzig, 1606, the University of Wittenberg, the University of Frankfurt (Oder), the University of Jena, where he became adjunct of the faculty of philosophy, and the University of Erfurt. He died in Speyer, aged 27.
