= Ptolemy's intense diatonic scale =

Diatonic scale tuning sequence proposed by Ptolemy

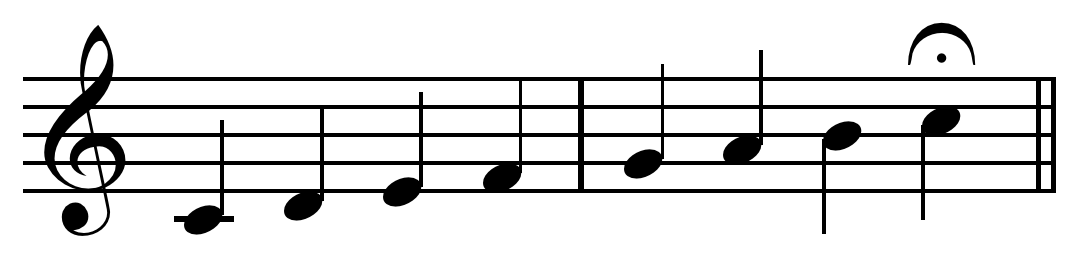
Diatonic scale on C, equal tempered and Ptolemy's intense or just.

Ptolemy's intense diatonic scale, also known as the Ptolemaic sequence, justly tuned major scale, Ptolemy's tense diatonic scale, or the syntonous (or syntonic) diatonic scale, is a tuning for the diatonic scale proposed by Ptolemy, created only with intervals from 5-limit just intonation. While Ptolemy is famous for this version of just intonation, it is important to realize this was only one of several genera of just, diatonic intonations he describes. He also describes 7-limit "soft" diatonics and an 11-limit "even" diatonic.

This tuning was declared by Zarlino to be the only tuning that could be reasonably sung, it was also supported by Giuseppe Tartini, and is equivalent to Indian Gandhar tuning which features exactly the same intervals.

It is produced through a tetrachord consisting of a greater tone (9:8), lesser tone (10:9), and just diatonic semitone (16:15). This is called Ptolemy's intense diatonic tetrachord (or "tense"), as opposed to Ptolemy's soft diatonic tetrachord (or "relaxed"), which is formed by 21:20, 10:9 and 8:7 intervals.

== Structure ==
The structure of the intense diatonic scale is shown in the tables below, where T is for greater tone, t is for lesser tone and s is for semitone:

Note	Name	C	D	E	F	G	A	B	C
Note	Solfege	Do	Re	Mi	Fa	Sol	La	Ti	Do
Note	Ratio from C	1:1	9:8	5:4	4:3	3:2	5:3	15:8	2:1
Note	Harmonic	24	27	30	32	36	40	45	48
Note	Cents	0	204	386	498	702	884	1088	1200
Step	Name		T	t	s	T	t	T	s
Step	Ratio		9:8	10:9	16:15	9:8	10:9	9:8	16:15
Step	Cents		204	182	112	204	182	204	112

Note	Name	A	B	C	D	E	F	G	A
Note	Ratio from A	1:1	9:8	6:5	4:3	3:2	8:5	9:5	2:1
Note	Harmonic of Fundamental B♭	120	135	144	160	180	192	216	240
Note	Cents	0	204	316	498	702	814	1018	1200
Step	Name		T	s	t	T	s	T	t
Step	Ratio		9:8	16:15	10:9	9:8	16:15	9:8	10:9
Step	Cents		204	112	182	204	112	204	182

== Comparison with other diatonic scales ==
Ptolemy's intense diatonic scale can be constructed by lowering the pitches of Pythagorean tuning's 3rd, 6th, and 7th degrees (in C, the notes E, A, and B) by the syntonic comma, 81:80. This scale may also be considered as derived from the just major chord (ratios 4:5:6, so a major third of 5:4 and fifth of 3:2), and the major chords a fifth below and a fifth above it: FAC–CEG–GBD. This perspective emphasizes the central role of the tonic, dominant, and subdominant in the diatonic scale.

In comparison to Pythagorean tuning, which only uses 3:2 perfect fifths (and fourths), the Ptolemaic provides just thirds (and sixths), both major and minor (5:4 and 6:5; sixths 5:3 and 8:5), which are smoother and more easily tuned than Pythagorean thirds (81:64 and 32:27) and Pythagorean sixths (27:16 and 128/81), with one minor third (and one major sixth) left at the Pythagorean interval, at the cost of replacing one fifth (and one fourth) with a wolf interval.

Intervals between notes (wolf intervals bolded):

	C	D	E	F	G	A	B	C′	D′	E′	F′	G′	A′	B′	C″
C	1:1	9:8	5:4	4:3	3:2	5:3	15:8	2:1	9:4	5:2	8:3	3:1	10:3	15:4	4:1
D	8:9	1:1	10:9	**32:27**	4:3	**40:27**	5:3	16:9	2:1	20:9	**64:27**	8:3	**80:27**	10:3	32:9
E	4:5	9:10	1:1	16:15	6:5	4:3	3:2	8:5	9:5	2:1	32:15	12:5	8:3	3:1	16:5
F	3:4	**27:32**	15:16	1:1	9:8	5:4	**45:32**	3:2	**27:16**	15:8	2:1	9:4	5:2	**45:16**	3:1
G	2:3	3:4	5:6	8:9	1:1	10:9	5:4	4:3	3:2	5:3	16:9	2:1	20:9	5:2	8:3
A	3:5	**27:40**	3:4	4:5	9:10	1:1	9:8	6:5	**27:20**	3:2	8:5	9:5	2:1	9:4	12:5
B	8:15	9:15	2:3	**32:45**	4:5	8:9	1:1	16:15	6:5	4:3	**64:45**	8:5	16:9	2:1	32:15
C′	1:2	9:16	5:8	2:3	3:4	5:6	15:16	1:1	9:8	5:4	4:3	3:2	5:3	15:8	2:1

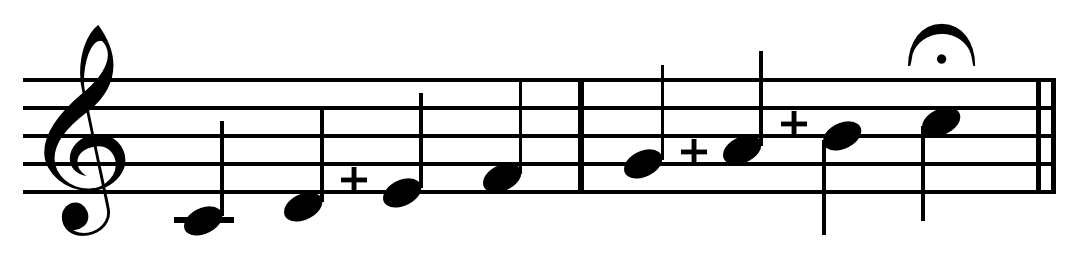
Pythagorean diatonic scale on C. Johnston's notation; + indicates the syntonic comma.

D–F is a Pythagorean minor third or semiditone (32:27), its inversion F–D is a Pythagorean major sixth (27:16); D–A is a wolf fifth (40:27), and its inversion A–D is a wolf fourth (27:20). All of these differ from their just counterparts by a syntonic comma (81:80). The triad built on the 2nd degree (D) is out-of-tune.

F-B is the tritone (more precisely, an augmented fourth), here 45:32, while B-F is a diminished fifth, here 64:45.
