= Degree (music) =

Position of a musical note on a scale relative to the tonic

In music theory, the scale degree is the position of a particular note on a scale relative to the tonic—the first and main note of the scale from which each octave is assumed to begin. Degrees are useful for indicating the size of intervals and chords and whether an interval is major or minor.

In the most general sense, the scale degree is the number given to each step of the scale, usually starting with 1 for tonic. Defining it like this implies that a tonic is specified. For instance, the 7-tone diatonic scale may become the major scale once the proper degree has been chosen as tonic (e.g. the C-major scale C–D–E–F–G–A–B, in which C is the tonic). If the scale has no tonic, the starting degree must be chosen arbitrarily. In set theory, for instance, the 12 degrees of the chromatic scale are usually numbered starting from C=0, the twelve pitch classes being numbered from 0 to 11.

In a more specific sense, scale degrees are given names that indicate their particular function within the scale (see table below). This implies a functional scale, as is the case in tonal music.

This example gives the names of the functions of the scale degrees in the seven-note diatonic scale. The names are the same for the major and minor scales, only the seventh degree changes name when flattened:

The term scale step is sometimes used synonymously with scale degree, but it may alternatively refer to the distance between two successive and adjacent scale degrees. The terms "whole step" and "half step" are commonly used as interval names (though "whole scale step" or "half scale step" are not used). The number of scale degrees and the distance between them together define the scale they are in.

In Schenkerian analysis, "scale degree" (or "scale step") translates Schenker's German Stufe, denoting "a chord having gained structural significance" (see Schenkerian analysis § Harmony).

== Major and minor scales ==
The degrees of the traditional major and minor scales may be identified several ways:

- by their ordinal numbers, as the first, second, third, fourth, fifth, sixth, or seventh degrees of the scale, sometimes raised or lowered;
- by Arabic numerals (1, 2, 3, 4 ...), as in the Nashville Number System, sometimes with carets ( ...);
- by Roman numerals (I, II, III, IV ...);
- by the name of their function, based on the Viennese theory of degrees: tonic, supertonic, mediant, subdominant, dominant, submediant, subtonic or leading note (leading tone in the United States), and tonic again. These names are derived from a scheme where the tonic note is the 'centre'. Then the supertonic and subtonic are, respectively, a second above and below the tonic; the mediant and submediant are a third above and below it; and the dominant and subdominant are a fifth above and below the tonic:
  			Tonic
  		Subtonic		Supertonic
  	Submediant				Mediant
  Subdominant						Dominant
  The word subtonic is used when the interval between it and the tonic in the upper octave is a whole step; leading note is used when that interval is a half-step.
- by their name according to the movable do solfège system: do, re, mi, fa, so(l), la, and si (or ti).

== Scale degree names ==
Degree	Name	Corresponding mode (major key)	Corresponding mode (minor key)	Meaning	Note (in A major)	Note (in A minor)	Semitones
1	Tonic	Ionian	Aeolian	Tonal center, note of final resolution	A	A	0
2	Supertonic	Dorian	Locrian	One whole step above the tonic	B	B	2
3	Mediant	Phrygian	Ionian	Midway between tonic and dominant, (in minor key) tonic of relative major key	C♯	C	3-4
4	Subdominant	Lydian	Dorian	Lower dominant, happens to have the same interval below tonic as dominant is above tonic	D	D	5
5	Dominant	Mixolydian	Phrygian	Second in importance to the tonic	E	E	7
6	Submediant	Aeolian	Lydian	Lower mediant, midway between tonic and subdominant, (in major key) tonic of relative minor key	F♯	F	8-9
7	Subtonic (minor seventh)		Mixolydian	One whole step below tonic in natural minor scale.		G	10
7	Leading tone (major seventh)	Locrian		One half step below tonic. Melodically strong affinity for and leads to tonic	G♯		11

== See also ==
- Factor (chord)
- Ear training and music education
