= Submediant =

Tonal degree of the diatonic scale

The scale and submediant triad in the A major (top) and A minor (bottom) scale.

In music, the submediant is the sixth degree of a diatonic scale. The submediant ("lower mediant") is named thus because it is halfway between the tonic and the subdominant ("lower dominant") or because its position below the tonic is symmetrical to that of the mediant above. (See the figure in the Degree (music) article.)

In the movable do solfège system, the submediant is sung as la in a major mode, le or lo in do-based minor and fa in la-based minor. It is occasionally called superdominant, as the degree above the dominant. This is its normal name (sus-dominante) in French.

In Roman numeral analysis, the triad formed on the submediant is typically symbolized by "VI" if it is a major triad (the default in a minor mode) and by "vi" if it is a minor triad (the default in a major mode).

The term submediant may also refer to a relationship of musical keys. For example, relative to the key of C major, the key of A minor is the submediant. In a major key, the submediant key is the relative minor. Modulation (change of key) to the submediant is relatively rare, compared with modulation to the dominant in a major key or modulation to the mediant (relative major) in a minor key.

== Chord ==
Amongst the primary roles played by the submediant chord is that in the deceptive cadence, V^{(7)}–vi in major or V^{(7)}–VI in minor. In a submediant chord, the third may be doubled.

A vi–ii–V–I chord progression in C

In major, the submediant chord also often appears as the starting point of a series of perfect descending fifths and ascending fourths leading to the dominant, vi–ii–V. This is because the relationship between vi and ii and between ii and V is the same as that between V and I. If all chords were major (I–VI–II–V–I), the succession would be one of secondary dominants. This submediant role is as common in popular and classical music as it is in jazz, or any other musical language related to Western European tonality. A more complete version starts the series of fifths on the chord of iii, iii–vi–ii–V–I, as in measures 11 and 12 of Charlie Parker's "Blues for Alice". In minor, the progression from VI to ii° (e.g. A♭ to D diminished in C minor) involves a diminished fifth, as does the ii° chord itself; it may nevertheless be used in VI–ii°–V–I by analogy with the major. Similarly, a scale's full counterclockwise circle of 5ths progression I–IV–vii°–iii–vi–ii–V–I can be used by analogy with the usual descending fifth progression, even though IV–vii° involves a diminished fifth.

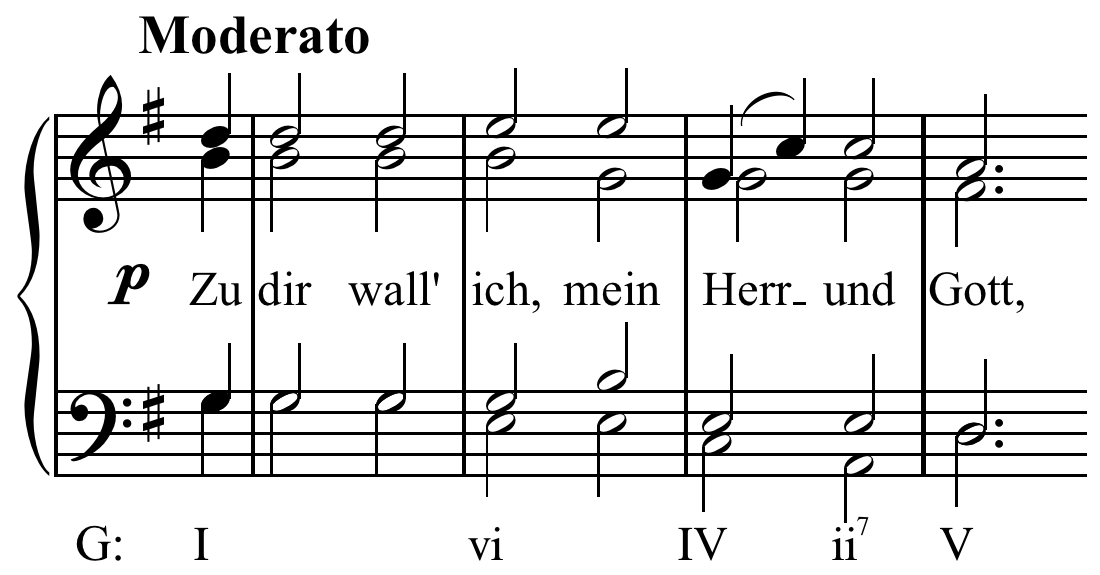
Wagner – Tannhäuser, "Zu dir wall' ich": I–vi–IV–ii–V progression

Another frequent progression is the sequence of descending thirds (I–vi–IV–ii–|–V in root position or first inversion), alternating major and minor chords. This progression is also frequent in jazz, where it is used in a shortened version ||: I vi | ii V7 :|| in what is nicknamed the "I Got Rhythm" progression by George Gershwin. This chord progression moves from tonic I, to the submediant (vi), to the supertonic ii, to the dominant V7.

Chromatic submediants, like chromatic mediants, are chords whose roots are related by a major third or minor third, contain one common tone, and share the same quality, i.e. major or minor. They may be altered chords.

Submediant chords may also appear as seventh chords: in major, as vi^{7}, or in minor as VI^{M7} or ♯vi^{ø}^{7}:

In rock and popular music, VI in minor often uses the chromatically lowered fifth scale degree as its seventh, VI^{7}, for example as in Bob Marley's clearly minor mode "I Shot The Sheriff".

== Name ==
The term mediant appeared in English in 1753 to refer to the note "midway between the tonic and the dominant". The term submediant must have appeared soon after to similarly denote the note midway between the tonic and the subdominant. The German word Untermediante is found in 1771. In France, on the other hand, the sixth degree of the scale was more often called the sus-dominante, as the degree above the dominant. This reflects a different conception of the diatonic scale and its degrees:

- In English as in German, the tonic is flanked on both sides by subtonic / supertonic, submediant / mediant and dominant / subdominant – the 7th degree being more usually known as the leading tone (or leading note) if it is a semitone under the tonic. (See the figure in Degree (music)#Major and minor scales);
- In French and Italian, a conception with two centres, subtonic (sous-tonique, sotto-tonica) and supertonic (sustonique, sopra-tonica) on both sides of the tonic, subdominant (sous-dominante, sotto-dominante) and "superdominant" (sus-dominante, sopra-dominante) on both sides of the dominant – and the mediant left alone between the two.

In the German theory derived from Hugo Riemann, the minor submediant in a major key is considered the Tonikaparallele (minor relative of the major tonic), labeled Tp, and the major submediant in a minor key is the Subdominantparallele (major relative of the minor subdominant), labeled sP.

== See also ==
- Deceptive cadence
