= Common practice period =

Western music history period (c. 1650 to 1900)

In Western classical music, the common practice period was the period of about 250 years during which the tonal system was regarded as the only basis for composition. It began when composers' use of the tonal system had clearly superseded earlier systems and ended when some composers began using significantly modified versions of the tonal system and developing other systems as well. Most features of the common practice (the accepted concepts of composition during this time) persisted from the mid-Baroque period through the Classical and Romantic periods, roughly from 1650 to 1900.

There was much stylistic evolution during these centuries, with patterns and conventions flourishing and then declining, such as the sonata form. The most prominent unifying feature throughout the period is a harmonic language to which music theorists can today apply Roman numeral chord analysis; however, the "common" in common practice period does not directly refer to any type of harmony, rather it refers to the fact that for over two hundred years only one system was used.

== Technical features ==
=== Harmony ===
The harmonic language of this period is known as "common-practice tonality", or sometimes the "tonal system" (though whether tonality implies common-practice idioms is a question of debate). Common-practice tonality represents a union between harmonic function and counterpoint. In other words, individual melodic lines, when taken together, express harmonic unity and goal-oriented progression. In tonal music, each tone in the diatonic scale functions according to its relationship to the tonic (the fundamental pitch of the scale). While diatonicism forms the basis for the tonal system, the system can withstand considerable chromatic alteration without losing its tonal identity.

Throughout the common-practice period, certain harmonic patterns span styles, composers, regions, and epochs. Johann Sebastian Bach and Richard Strauss, for instance, may both write passages that can be analysed according to the progression I-ii-V-I, despite vast differences in style and context. Such harmonic conventions can be distilled into the familiar chord progressions with which musicians analyse and compose tonal music.

Various popular idioms of the twentieth century differ from the standardized chord progressions of the common-practice period. While these later styles incorporate many elements of the tonal vocabulary (such as major and minor chords), the function of these elements is not identical to classical models of counterpoint and harmonic function. For example, in common-practice harmony, a major triad built on the fifth degree of the scale (V) is unlikely to progress directly to a root position triad built on the fourth degree of the scale (IV), but the reverse of this progression (IV–V) is quite common. By contrast, the V–IV progression is readily acceptable by many other standards; for example, this transition is essential to the "shuffle" blues progression's last line (V–IV–I–I), which has become the orthodox ending for blues progressions at the expense of the original last line (V–V–I–I).

=== Rhythm ===
Coordination of the various parts of a piece of music through an externalized metre is a deeply rooted aspect of common-practice music. Rhythmically, common practice metric structures generally include:

1. Clearly enunciated or implied pulse at all levels, with the fastest levels rarely being extreme
2. Metres, or pulse groups, in two-pulse or three-pulse groups, most often two
3. Metre and pulse groups that, once established, rarely change throughout a section or composition
4. Synchronous pulse groups on all levels: all pulses on slower levels coincide with strong pulses on faster levels
5. Consistent tempo throughout a composition or section
6. Tempo, beat length, and measure length chosen to allow one time signature throughout the piece or section

=== Duration ===
Durational patterns typically include:

1. Small or moderate duration complement and range, with one duration (or pulse) predominating in the duration hierarchy, are heard as the basic unit throughout a composition. Exceptions are most frequently extremely long, such as pedal tones; or, if they are short, they generally occur as the rapidly alternating or transient components of trills, tremolos, or other ornaments.
2. Rhythmic units are based on metric or intrametric patterns, though specific contrametric or extrametric patterns are signatures of certain styles or composers. Triplets and other extrametric patterns are usually heard on levels higher than the basic durational unit or pulse.
3. Rhythmic gestures of a limited number of rhythmic units, sometimes based on a single or alternating pair.
4. Thetic (i.e., stressed), anacrustic (i.e., unstressed), and initial rest rhythmic gestures are used, with anacrustic beginnings and strong endings possibly most frequent and upbeat endings most rare.
5. Rhythmic gestures are repeated exactly or in variation after contrasting gestures. There may be one rhythmic gesture almost exclusively throughout an entire composition, but complete avoidance of repetition is rare.
6. Composite rhythms confirm the metre, often in metric or even note patterns identical to the pulse on specific metric level.

Patterns of pitch and duration are of primary importance in common practice melody, while tone quality is of secondary importance. Durations recur and are often periodic; pitches are generally diatonic.
