= Supertonic =

Tonal degree of the diatonic scale

The scale and supertonic triad in C major (top) and C minor (bottom).

In music, the supertonic is the second degree of a diatonic scale, one whole step above the tonic. In the movable do solfège system, the supertonic note is sung as re.

The triad built on the supertonic note is called the supertonic chord. In Roman numeral analysis, the supertonic chord is typically symbolized by the Roman numeral "ii" in a major key, indicating that the chord is a minor chord (in C: D–F–A). In a minor key, it is indicated by "ii^{o}," indicating that the chord is a diminished chord (in C: D–F–A♭). Because it is a diminished chord, it usually appears in first inversion (ii^{o6}) so that no note dissonates with the bass note.

These chords may also appear as seventh chords: in major, as ii^{7} (in C: D–F–A–C), while in minor as ii^{ø}^{7} (in C: D–F–A♭–C) or rarely ii^{7}. They are the second-most common form of nondominant seventh chords.

ii^{7} (first and third chords)

ii^{ø}^{7} (second chord)

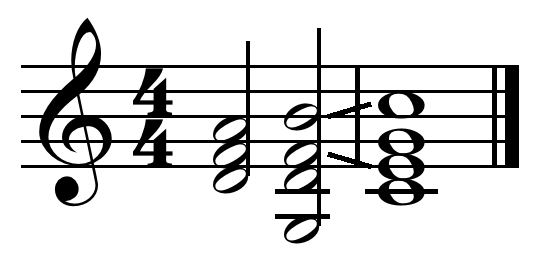
Supertonic (ii) in ii–V–I progression on C, found at the end of the circle progression

The supertonic chord normally functions as a predominant chord, a chord that resolves to a chord with dominant function. The supertonic chord lies a fifth above the V chord. Descending fifths are a strong basis for harmonic motion (see circle of fifths). The supertonic is one of the strongest predominants.

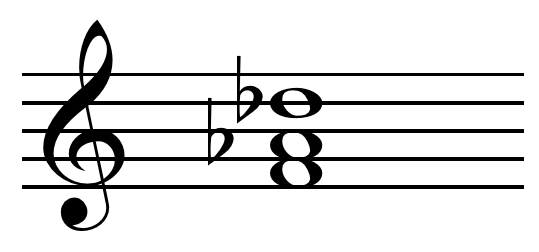
In C major: A Neapolitan sixth chord in first inversion contains an interval of a sixth between F and D♭

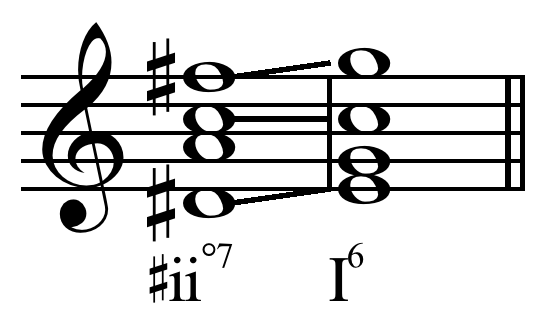
Common-tone diminished seventh chord resolving to I^{6}

In major or minor, the major chord built on the lowered supertonic (♭) is called a Neapolitan chord (in C: D♭–F–A♭), notated as N^{6} or ♭II^{6}, usually used in first inversion. The supertonic may be raised as part of the common-tone diminished seventh chord, ♯ii^{o}^{7} (in C: D♯–F♯–A–C). One variant of the supertonic seventh chord is the supertonic diminished seventh with the raised supertonic, which equals the lowered third through enharmonic equivalence (in C: D♯=E♭).

The term supertonic may also refer to a relationship of musical keys. For example, relative to the key of C major, the key of D major (or D minor) is the supertonic.

In Riemannian theory, the supertonic is considered the subdominant parallel: Sp/T in major though sP/T in minor (A♭M).
