= Tonic (music) =

Tonal center of a diatonic scale

Scale and tonic triad in C major (top)
and C minor (bottom)

In music, "tonic" refers to the originating note or chord of a particular key.

Scales are based on their tonic pitch, or tonic note, which is why they begin and end with their tonic pitch. This is also why scales are named after their tonics: for instance, the tonic of the C major scale is the note C. In the movable do solfège system, the tonic note is sung as do.

"Tonic" may also refer to the tonic triad, which is a triad built on the tonic pitch, or more generally to a tonic chord of another quality. The tonic often functions as the tonal center or final resolution tone of tonal music, and is commonly the goal of the final cadence in tonal harmony.

In very much conventionally tonal music, harmonic analysis will reveal a broad prevalence of the primary (often triadic) harmonies: tonic, dominant, and subdominant (i.e., I and its chief auxiliaries a 5th removed), and especially the first two of these.

— Berry (1976)

The tonic is distinguished from the root, which is the note on which a chord is built. While the tonic pitch serves as the root of a tonic chord, it is not the root of other chords.

In Roman numeral analysis, the tonic triad is typically symbolized by the Roman numeral "I" if it is major and by "i" if it is minor. While tonic triads are most prevalent, tonic chords may also appear as seventh chords: in major, as I^{M7}, or in minor as i^{7} or rarely i^{M7}:

== Importance and function ==
In music of the common practice period, the tonic center was the most important of all the different tone centers which a composer used in a piece of music, with most pieces beginning and ending on the tonic, usually modulating to the dominant (the fifth scale degree above the tonic, or the fourth below it) in between.

Two parallel keys have the same tonic. For example, in both C major and C minor, the tonic is C. However, relative keys (two different scales that share the same key signature) have different tonics. For example, C major and A minor share a key signature that features no sharps or flats, despite having different tonic pitches (C and A, respectively).

The theme that opens Claude Debussy's Prélude à l'après-midi d'un faune

The term tonic may be reserved exclusively for use in tonal contexts while tonal center or pitch center may be used in post-tonal and atonal music: "For purposes of non-tonal centric music, it might be a good idea to have the term 'tone center' refer to the more general class of which 'tonics' (or tone centers in tonal contexts) could be regarded as a subclass." Thus, a pitch center may function referentially or contextually in an atonal context, often acting as an axis or line of symmetry in an interval cycle. The term pitch centricity was coined by Arthur Berger in his "Problems of Pitch Organization in Stravinsky". According to Walter Piston, "the idea of a unified classical tonality replaced by nonclassical (in this case nondominant) centricity in a composition is perfectly demonstrated by Debussy's Prélude à l'après-midi d'un faune".

The tonic includes four separate activities or roles as the principal goal tone, initiating event, generator of other tones, and the stable center neutralizing the tension between dominant and subdominant.

The tonic chord is said to have tonic function where the tension is at its lowest and the chord progression is resolved, alongside other chords such as the submediant (vi) chord.

== See also ==
- Final (music) – final pitch in Gregorian mode
- Fundamental frequency – Lowest frequency of a periodic waveform, such as sound
- Double tonic – motion between two tonal centers
- Subtonic – scale degree one whole step below tonic
- Supertonic – scale degree one whole step above tonic
- Tonicization – temporary tonic
