= Minor chord =

Combination of three or more notes

minor triad
Component intervals from root
- perfect fifth
- minor third

Tuning
- just - 10:12:15

Forte no.
- 3-11

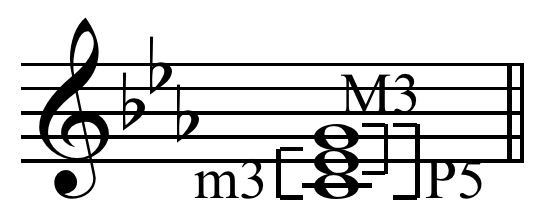
A minor triad has a minor third (m3) on the bottom, a major third (M3) on top, and a perfect fifth (P5) between the outer notes.

A minor chord is a triad with a minor third and a perfect fifth above the root. The minor triad built on C is spelled C–E♭–G.

== Structure ==
The primary intervals in a minor chord are the minor third above the root, and the perfect fifth above the root. There is a major third between the third and fifth. It is a tertian chord because it is built in thirds.A minor triad is represented by the integer notation {0,3,7}.

On lead sheets, a minor chord is sometimes indicated by the letter of its root followed by the abbreviation "MI" in small caps font. Other variations include the abbreviations (in normal font) "min", "mi", "m", or the minus sign character "-". For example, D min, D mi, D m, or D -.

The minor chord timbre is sometimes described as darker than its major counterpart.

== Just intonation ==
Septimal 6:7:9 minor triad on C Just 10:12:15 minor triad on C Supertonic 27:32:40 minor triad on D

Pythagorean 54:64:81 minor triad on C
MIDI files of minor triads in just intonation

In just intonation, a minor chord is tuned in the frequency ratio 10:12:15, reflecting an appearance of the minor chord in the harmonic series. The ratio was refined to 10/9:4/3:5/3 by Ben Johnston. In a just major scale, the 10:12:15 minor triad appears on iii and vi.

A justly tuned perfect fifth is 702 cents, compared to 700 cents in equal temperament. The just minor third is 316 cents, where the equal-tempered interval is 300 cents.

Alternate just minor chord tunings include:

- 16:19:24
- 6:7:9
- The Pythagorean minor triad: 54:64:81.

Georg Andreas Sorge derived the minor chord from the confluence of two major triads such as F-A-C and C-E-G. An A minor triad arises from the connection. He pointed out that overtones 10, 12, 15, and 18 of the harmonic series form a minor seventh chord.

== See also ==
- Major and minor
- Musical tuning
- Major chord
- Otonality and Utonality
