= Albert Lavignac =

French music scholar (1846–1916)

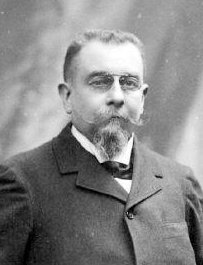
- Born: 21 January 1846; Paris
- Died: 28 May 1916 (aged 70); Paris
- Occupations: Musicologist; Composer

Alexandre Jean Albert Lavignac (French pronunciation: [alɛksɑ̃dʁ ʒɑ̃ albɛʁ laviɲak]; 21 January 1846 – 28 May 1916) was a French music scholar, known for his essays on theory, and a minor composer.

== Biography ==
Lavignac was born in Paris and studied with Antoine François Marmontel, François Benoist and Ambroise Thomas at the Conservatoire de Paris, where later he taught harmony. Among his pupils were Henri Casadesus, Claude Debussy, Vincent d'Indy, Amédée Gastoué, Philipp Jarnach, Henri O'Kelly, Gabriel Pierné, Wadia Sabra, Florent Schmitt. See: List of music students by teacher: K to M#Albert Lavignac.

In March 1864, at the age of eighteen, he conducted from the harmonium the private premiere of Gioachino Rossini's Petite messe solennelle.

His condensed work, La Musique et les Musiciens, an overview of musical grammar and materials, continued to be reprinted years after his death. In it he characterised the particular characteristics of instruments and of each key, somewhat in the way Berlioz and Gevaert (Traité d'orchestration, Gand, 1863, p. 189) had done:

Major keys:

- C♯ major: ? ("?")
- F♯ major: Rough ("rude")
- B major: Energetic ("énergique")
- E major: Radiant, warm, joyous ("éclatant, chaud, joyeux")
- A major: Frank, sonorous ("franc, sonore")
- D major: Joyful, brilliant, alert ("gai, brilland, alerte")
- G major: Rural, merry ("champêtre, gai")
- C major: Simple, naive, commonplace ("simple, naïf, franc, ou plat et commun")
- F major: Pastoral, rustic ("pastoral, agreste")
- B♭ major: Noble and elegant, graceful ("noble et élégant, gracieux")
- E♭ major: Vigorous, chivalrous ("sonore, énergique, chevaleresque")
- A♭ major: Gentle, caressing, or pompous ("doux, caressant, ou pompeux")
- D♭ major: Charming, suave, placid ("plein de charme, placide, suave")
- G♭ major: Gentle and calm ("doux et calme")
- C♭ major: ? ("?")

Minor keys:

- A♯ minor: ? ("?")
- D♯ minor: ? ("?")
- G♯ minor: Very somber ("très sombre")
- C♯ minor: Brutal, sinister, or very sombre ("brutal, sinistre ou très sombre")
- F♯ minor: Rough, or light, aerial ("rude ou léger, aérien")
- B minor: Savage or sombre but vigorous ("sauvage ou sombre, mais énergique")
- E minor: Sad, agitated ("triste, agité")
- A minor: Simple, naive, sad, rustic ("simple, naïf, triste, rustique")
- D minor: Serious, concentrated ("sérieux, concentré")
- G minor: Melancholy, shy ("mélancolique, ombrageux")
- C minor: Gloomy, dramatic, violent ("sombre, dramatique, violent")
- F minor: Morose, surly, or energetic ("morose, chagrin, ou énergique")
- B♭ minor: Funeral or mysterious ("funèbre ou mystérieux")
- E♭ minor: Profoundly sad ("profondément triste")
- A♭ minor: Lugubrious, anguished ("lugubre, angoissé")

His more popularized works discussed the music dramas of Richard Wagner, summarised in Le Voyage artistique à Bayreuth.

== Selected works ==
Lavignac edited the compendious Encyclopédie de la Musique.

- Cours complet théoretique et pratique de dictée musicale (1882)
- École de la pédale (1889)
- La musique et les musiciens (1895). Translated into English, 1905
- Le voyage artistique à Bayreuth (1897). An analysis of Wagner's leitmotifs
- The Music Dramas of Richard Wagner and His Festival Theater in Bayreuth (New York, 1899)
