= G-sharp major =

Major key signature

G-sharp major Alternative notations
- Relative key: E-sharp minor →enharmonic: F minor
- Parallel key: G-sharp minor
- Dominant key: D-sharp major →enharmonic: E-flat major
- Subdominant key: C-sharp major
- Enharmonic key: A-flat major

Component pitches
- G♯, A♯, B♯, C♯, D♯, E♯, F

G-sharp major is a musical key based on G♯, consisting of the pitches G♯, A♯, B♯, C♯, D♯, E♯, and F. Its key signature has eight sharps, requiring one double sharp and six single sharps. Because the same pitches can be indicated by the enharmonically equivalent key of A-flat major (with four flats), a G-sharp major key signature is extremely rare.

Its relative minor is E-sharp minor, which would be replaced by F minor. Its parallel minor is G-sharp minor.

The G-sharp major scale is:

Changes needed for the melodic and harmonic versions of the scale are written in with accidentals as necessary. The G-sharp harmonic major and melodic major scales are:

Although the enharmonic key of A-flat major is preferred because it has only four flats, compared with G-sharp major's eight sharps (including the F), G-sharp major appears as a secondary key area in several works in sharp keys, most notably in the Prelude and Fugue in C-sharp major from Johann Sebastian Bach's The Well-Tempered Clavier, Book 1. The G-sharp minor prelude (and the fugue) from the same set ends with a Picardy third, on a G-sharp major chord. G-sharp major is tonicised briefly in several of Frédéric Chopin's nocturnes in C-sharp minor. A section in the second movement of Chopin's Piano Concerto No. 1 is in G-sharp major, although the key signature has four sharps. The end of the exposition of the second movement Charles-Valentin Alkan's Grande sonate 'Les quatre âges', subtitled Quasi-Faust, is in G-sharp major, albeit written with a six-sharp key signature (the movement opens in D-sharp minor and ends in F-sharp major).

The final pages of A World Requiem by John Foulds are written in G-sharp major. The key signature is shown as in the example with the scale above, starting with the C♯ and ending at the F (C♯, G♯, D♯, A♯, E♯, B♯, F).

In tuning systems where the number of notes per octave is not a multiple of 12, notes such as G♯ and A♭ are not enharmonically equivalent, nor are the corresponding key signatures. These tunings can produce keys with no analogue in 12-tone equal temperament, which can require double sharps, double flats, or microtonal alterations in key signatures. For example, the key of G-sharp major, with eight sharps, is equivalent to A-flat major in 12-tone equal temperament, but in 19-tone equal temperament, it is equivalent to A-double-flat major instead, with 11 flats.

== Scale degree chords ==
- Tonic – G-sharp major
- Supertonic – A-sharp minor
- Mediant – B-sharp minor
- Subdominant – C-sharp major
- Dominant – D-sharp major
- Submediant – E-sharp minor
- Leading-tone – F-double-sharp diminished

== See also ==
- Key (music)
- Major and minor
- Chord (music)
- Chord notation
- Key signature § Double flats and sharps

| No. | Flats | | Sharps | |
| No. | Major | minor | Major | minor |
|---|---|---|---|---|
| 0 | C | a | C | a |
| 1 | F | d | G | e |
| 2 | B♭ | g | D | b |
| 3 | E♭ | c | A | f♯ |
| 4 | A♭ | f | E | c♯ |
| 5 | D♭ | b♭ | B | g♯ |
| 6 | G♭ | e♭ | F♯ | d♯ |
| 7 | C♭ | a♭ | C♯ | a♯ |
| 8 | F♭ | d♭ | G♯ | e♯ |
