= D-flat major =

Major scale based on D♭

- Relative key: B-flat minor
- Parallel key: D-flat minor →enharmonic: C-sharp minor
- Dominant key: A-flat major
- Subdominant key: G-flat major
- Enharmonic key: C-sharp major

Component pitches
- D♭, E♭, F, G♭, A♭, B♭, C

D-flat major is a major scale based on D♭, consisting of the pitches D♭, E♭, F, G♭, A♭, B♭ and C. Its key signature has five flats.

The D-flat major scale is:

Changes needed for the melodic and harmonic versions of the scale are written in with accidentals as necessary. The D-flat harmonic major and melodic major scales are:

Its relative minor is B-flat minor. Its parallel minor, D-flat minor, would feature a B (B-double-flat) in its key signature, and is usually written as the enharmonic key of C-sharp minor, with only four sharps. The enharmonic equivalent of D-flat major is C-sharp major.

In music for the harp, D-flat major is preferred enharmonically not only because harp strings are more resonant in the flat position and the key has fewer accidentals, but also because modulation to the dominant key is easier (by putting the G pedal in the natural position, whereas there is no double-sharp position in which to put the F pedal for G-sharp major).

== Scale degree chords ==
The scale degree chords of D-flat major are:

- Tonic – D-flat major
- Supertonic – E-flat minor
- Mediant – F minor
- Subdominant – G-flat major
- Dominant – A-flat major
- Submediant – B-flat minor
- Leading-tone – C diminished

== Compositions in D-flat major ==
Hector Berlioz called the key "majestic" in his 1856 Grand Traité d'Instrumentation et d'Orchestration modernes, while having a much different opinion of its enharmonic counterpart, calling it "Less vague; and more elegant". Despite this, when he came to orchestrate Carl Maria von Weber's piano piece Invitation to the Dance in 1841, he transposed it from D-flat to D major, to give the strings a more manageable key and to produce a brighter sound.

Charles-Marie Widor considered D-flat major to be the best key for flute music.

Although this key was unexplored during the Baroque and Classical periods and was rarely used as the main key for orchestral works of the 18th century, Franz Schubert used it quite frequently in his sets of écossaises, valses and so on, as well as entering it and even flatter keys in his sonatas, impromptus and the like. Ludwig van Beethoven, too, used this key extensively in his second piano concerto. D-flat major was used as the key for the slow movements of Joseph Haydn's Piano Sonata Hob XVI:46 in A-flat major, and Beethoven's "Moonlight" and "Appassionata" sonatas. Chopin's Minute Waltz from Op. 64 is in D-flat major and most of his Scherzo No.2, despite relative minor being the tonic.

A part of the trio of Scott Joplin's "Maple Leaf Rag" is written in D-flat major.

The flattened pitches of D-flat major correspond to the black keys of the piano, and there is much significant piano music written in this key. Pyotr Ilyich Tchaikovsky's Piano Concerto No. 1 is written in B-flat minor, but the famous opening theme is in D-flat major. Tchaikovsky composed the second movement of Piano Concerto No. 1 also in D-flat. Sergei Rachmaninoff composed the famous 18th variation of his Rhapsody on a Theme of Paganini in this key, perhaps emphasizing the generally held view that D-flat major is the most romantically flavored of the major keys; and his friend Nikolai Medtner similarly chose it for the sensually romantic "big tune" in the last movement of his Piano Concerto No. 3 ("Ballade"). Claude Debussy also composed the famous "Clair de lune" in this key, with a significant section in C-sharp minor. Edvard Grieg composed the second movement of his Piano Concerto in D-flat. Frédéric Chopin's Nocturne in D-flat, Op. 27 and Berceuse, Op. 57 are in this key. Franz Liszt composed heavily in this key, with his most recognizable piece being the third movement of his piano composition Trois études de concert, dubbed "Un sospiro". Liszt took advantage of the piano's configuration of the key and used it to create an arpeggiating melody using alternating hands. Several of his Consolations are also written in this key.

In orchestral music, the examples are fewer. Gustav Mahler concluded his Ninth Symphony with an Adagio in D-flat major, rather than the home key of D major of the first movement. Anton Bruckner wrote the third movement of his Symphony No. 8 in D-flat major, while every other movement is in C minor. Antonín Dvořák wrote the second movement of his Symphony No. 9 in D-flat major, while every other movement is in E minor. The first piano concerto of Sergei Prokofiev is also written in D-flat major, with a short slow movement in G-sharp minor. Aram Khachaturian wrote his Piano Concerto, Op. 38 in the key of D-flat major. Choral writing explores D-flat infrequently, notable examples being Robert Schumann's Requiem, Op. 148, Gabriel Fauré's Cantique de Jean Racine and Sergei Rachmaninoff's "Nunc Dimittis" from his All-Night Vigil, Op. 37. Vincent d'Indy's String Quartet No. 3, Op. 96, which is in D-flat.

== See also ==
- List of symphonies in D-flat major

No.	Flats		Sharps	
No.	Major	minor	Major	minor
0	C	a	C	a
1	F	d	G	e
2	B♭	g	D	b
3	E♭	c	A	f♯
4	A♭	f	E	c♯
5	D♭	b♭	B	g♯
6	G♭	e♭	F♯	d♯
7	C♭	a♭	C♯	a♯
8	F♭	d♭	G♯	e♯
