= B major =

Major scale based on B

- Relative key: G-sharp minor
- Parallel key: B minor
- Dominant key: F-sharp major
- Subdominant key: E major
- Enharmonic key: C-flat major

Component pitches
- B, C♯, D♯, E, F♯, G♯, A♯

B major is a major scale based on B. The pitches B, C♯, D♯, E, F♯, G♯, and A♯ are all part of the B major scale. Its key signature has five sharps. Its relative minor is G-sharp minor, its parallel minor is B minor, and its enharmonic equivalent is C-flat major.

The B major scale is:

Changes needed for the melodic and harmonic versions of the scale are written in with accidentals as necessary. The B harmonic major and melodic major scales are:

Although B major is usually considered a remote key (due to its distance from C major in the circle of fifths and fairly large number of sharps), Frédéric Chopin regarded its scale as the easiest of all to play on the piano, as its black notes fit the natural positions of the fingers well; as a consequence he often assigned it first to beginning piano students, leaving the scale of C major until last because he considered it the hardest of all scales to play completely evenly (because of its complete lack of black notes).

Few large-scale works in B major exist: these include Haydn's Symphony No. 46. The aria "La donna è mobile" from Verdi's opera Rigoletto is in the key, as is the "Flower Duet" from Lakmé. Schubert's Piano Sonata, D. 575 and Dvořák's Nocturne Op. 40 are in B major. Brahms's Piano Trio No. 1, Op. 8, is in B major, though the piece ends in B minor. Brahms also wrote the slow movement to his Second Symphony in B major, as well as the fourth and last piece of the Ballades, Op. 10. The second movement of Beethoven's Piano Concerto No. 5 "Emperor" is in B major. The "Tuileries" movement from Mussorgsky's Pictures at an Exhibition is in the key. Tchaikovsky's Manfred Symphony in B minor ends in B major. The Finale from Igor Stravinsky's Firebird Suite is also in this key.

In some tuning systems, notes such as B and C♭ are not enharmonically equivalent, nor are the corresponding key signatures. For example, the key of B major, with five sharps, is equivalent to C-flat major, with seven flats in 12-tone equal temperament, but in 19-tone equal temperament, it is equivalent to C-double-flat major instead, with 14 flats.

== Scale degree chords ==
The scale degree chords of B major are:

- Tonic – B major
- Supertonic – C-sharp minor
- Mediant – D-sharp minor
- Subdominant – E major
- Dominant – F-sharp major
- Submediant – G-sharp minor
- Leading-tone – A-sharp diminished

== See also ==
- Major and minor
- List of symphonies in B major

No.	Flats		Sharps	
No.	Major	minor	Major	minor
0	C	a	C	a
1	F	d	G	e
2	B♭	g	D	b
3	E♭	c	A	f♯
4	A♭	f	E	c♯
5	D♭	b♭	B	g♯
6	G♭	e♭	F♯	d♯
7	C♭	a♭	C♯	a♯
8	F♭	d♭	G♯	e♯
