= G-sharp minor =

Key signature

- Relative key: B major
- Parallel key: G-sharp major →enharmonic: A-flat major
- Dominant key: D-sharp minor
- Subdominant key: C-sharp minor
- Enharmonic key: A-flat minor

Component pitches
- G♯, A♯, B, C♯, D♯, E, F♯

G-sharp minor is a minor scale based on G♯, consisting of the pitches G♯, A♯, B, C♯, D♯, E, and F♯. Its key signature has five sharps.

Its relative major is B major. Its parallel major, G-sharp major, features an F in its key signature, and is usually written as the enharmonic equivalent of A-flat major with only four flats.

The G-sharp natural minor scale is:

Changes needed for the melodic and harmonic versions of the scale are written in with accidentals as necessary. The G-sharp harmonic minor and melodic minor scales are:

== Scale degree chords ==
The scale degree chords of G-sharp minor are:

- Tonic – G-sharp minor
- Supertonic – A-sharp diminished
- Mediant – B major
- Subdominant – C-sharp minor
- Dominant – D-sharp minor
- Submediant – E major
- Subtonic – F-sharp major

== Music in G-sharp minor ==
Despite the key rarely being used in orchestral music other than to modulate, it is more common in keyboard music, as in Piano Sonata No. 2 by Alexander Scriabin, who actually seemed to prefer writing in it. Dmitri Shostakovich used the key in the second movement of his 8th String Quartet, and the slow fourth movement of his 8th Symphony is also in this key. If G-sharp minor is used in orchestral music, composers generally write B♭ wind instruments in the enharmonic B-flat minor, rather than A-sharp minor to facilitate reading the music (or A instruments are used instead, giving a transposed key of B minor).

Few symphonies are written in G-sharp minor; among them are Nikolai Myaskovsky's 17th Symphony, Elliot Goldenthal's Symphony in G-sharp minor (2014) and an abandoned work of juvenilia by Marc Blitzstein.

The minuet from the Piano Sonata in E-flat major, Op. 44 ("The Farewell") by Jan Ladislav Dussek is in G-sharp minor.

Frédéric Chopin composed a Polonaise in G-sharp minor, Op. posth., in 1822. His Étude Op. 25 No. 6, the first mazurka from his Op. 33 and his 12th prelude from the 24 Preludes, Op. 28, are in G-sharp minor as well.

Modest Mussorgsky wrote the movements, "Il vecchio castello" (The Old Castle) and "Bydło" (Cattle), from Pictures at an Exhibition in G-sharp minor.

Liszt's "La campanella" from his Grandes études de Paganini is in G-sharp minor.

Alexander Scriabin's Second Piano Sonata "Sonata-Fantasy", Op. 19, is in G-sharp minor.

Maurice Ravel's "Scarbo" from Gaspard de la nuit (1908), is in G-sharp minor.

Sibelius wrote the slow movement of his Third Symphony in G-sharp minor.

Beethoven wrote the sixth movement of his 14th String Quartet in G-sharp minor.

Bach also wrote the movements, "Prelude and Fugue No. 18", from both books of The Well-Tempered Clavier which is also in G-sharp minor; both movements from Book 1 end with a Picardy third, utilizing a B-sharp in the final G-sharp major chord.

== See also ==
- Key (music)
- Major and minor

No.	Flats		Sharps	
No.	Major	minor	Major	minor
0	C	a	C	a
1	F	d	G	e
2	B♭	g	D	b
3	E♭	c	A	f♯
4	A♭	f	E	c♯
5	D♭	b♭	B	g♯
6	G♭	e♭	F♯	d♯
7	C♭	a♭	C♯	a♯
8	F♭	d♭	G♯	e♯
