= F minor =

Minor key and scale based on F

- Relative key: A-flat major
- Parallel key: F major
- Dominant key: C minor
- Subdominant key: B-flat minor

Component pitches
- F, G, A♭, B♭, C, D♭, E♭

F minor is a minor scale based on F, consisting of the pitches F, G, A♭, B♭, C, D♭, and E♭. Its key signature consists of four flats. Its relative major is A-flat major and its parallel major is F major. The F natural minor scale is

Changes needed for the melodic and harmonic versions of the scale are written in with accidentals as necessary. The F harmonic minor and melodic minor scales are

== Scale degree chords ==
The scale degree chords of F minor are:

- Tonic – F minor
- Supertonic – G diminished
- Mediant – A-flat major
- Subdominant – B-flat minor
- Dominant – C minor
- Submediant – D-flat major
- Subtonic – E-flat major

== Music in F minor ==
Famous pieces in the key of F minor include Beethoven's Appassionata Sonata, Chopin's Piano Concerto No. 2, Ballade No. 4, Haydn's Symphony No. 49, La Passione and Tchaikovsky’s Symphony No. 4.

Glenn Gould once said if he could be any key, he would be F minor, because "it's rather dour, halfway between complex and stable, between upright and lascivious, between gray and highly tinted... There is a certain obliqueness."

Hermann von Helmholtz once described F minor as harrowing and melancholy. Christian Schubart described this key as "Deep depression, funereal lament, groans of misery and longing for the grave".

=== Notable compositions ===
- Giovanni Battista Pergolesi
  - Stabat Mater
- Antonio Vivaldi
  - "Winter" from The Four Seasons, RV 297
- Johann Sebastian Bach
  - Harpsichord Concerto No. 5, BWV 1056
  - "Ich ruf zu dir, Herr Jesu Christ", BWV 639
- Joseph Haydn
  - Symphony No. 49 ("La Passione")
  - Variations in F minor
- Wolfgang Amadeus Mozart
  - Aria "L'ho perduta, me meschina" from The Marriage of Figaro, act 4
  - Adagio and Allegro in F minor for a mechanical organ, K. 594
- Jan Ladislav Dussek
  - Piano Sonata No. 28 in F minor "L'invocation", Op. 77
- Ludwig van Beethoven
  - Egmont, Op. 84: Overture in F minor
  - Piano Sonata No. 1, Op. 2/1
  - Piano Sonata No. 23 (Appassionata), Op. 57
  - String Quartet No. 11 "Serioso", Op. 95
- Felix Mendelssohn
  - String Quartet No. 6
  - Organ Sonata, Op. 65, No. 1
- Carl Maria von Weber
  - Clarinet Concerto No. 1
  - Konzertstück in F minor
- Frédéric Chopin
  - Ballade No. 4, Op. 52
  - Fantaisie in F minor, Op. 49
  - Trois nouvelles études, No. 1
  - Étude Op. 10, No. 9
  - Étude Op. 25, No. 2 "Bees"
  - Prelude Op. 28, No. 18 "Suicide"
  - Piano Concerto No. 2, Op. 21
  - Nocturne in F minor, Op. 55 No. 1
  - Mazurka, Op. 63 No. 2
  - Mazurka, Op. 68 No. 4 (Posthumous)
- Charles-Valentin Alkan
  - Prelude, Op. 31, No. 2 (Assez lentement)
  - Symphony for Solo Piano, 2nd movement: Marche funèbre
- Franz Liszt
  - Funérailles
  - Transcendental Étude No. 10 "Appassionata"
  - Trois études de concert, No. 2 "La leggierezza"
- Franz Schubert
  - Fantasia in F minor
  - Impromptu No. 1, Op. 142
  - Impromptu No. 4, Op. 142
- Robert Schumann
  - Piano Sonata No. 3
- Johannes Brahms
  - Piano Quintet, Op. 34
  - Piano Sonata No. 3, Op. 5
- Pyotr Ilyich Tchaikovsky
  - Symphony No. 4
  - The Tempest
- Anton Bruckner
  - Mass No. 3
- Alexander Borodin
  - String Quintet
- Paul Dukas
  - The Sorcerer's Apprentice (L'apprenti sorcier)
- Ralph Vaughan Williams
  - English Folk Songs
  - Symphony No. 4
  - Tuba Concerto in F minor
- Dmitri Shostakovich
  - Symphony No. 1
  - String Quartet No. 11, Op. 122
- Max Reger
  - Piano Concerto in F minor, Op. 114
- Johann Pachelbel
  - Chaconne in F minor

== E-sharp minor ==
E-sharp minor Alternative notations
- Relative key: G-sharp major →enharmonic: A-flat major
- Parallel key: E-sharp major →enharmonic: F major
- Dominant key: B-sharp minor →enharmonic: C minor
- Subdominant key: A-sharp minor
- Enharmonic key: F minor

Component pitches
- E♯, F, G♯, A♯, B♯, C♯, D♯

E-sharp minor is a key based on the musical note E♯, consisting of the pitches E♯, F, G♯, A♯, B♯, C♯ and D♯. Its key signature has eight sharps, requiring one double sharp and six single sharps. Because E-sharp minor requires eight sharps, including the F, it is almost always notated as its enharmonic equivalent of F minor, with four flats. The same is true of the relative major of G-sharp major, usually replaced by A-flat major. E-sharp major, the parallel major, would also be replaced by F major, since E-sharp major requires four double-sharps.

The E-sharp natural minor scale is:

Changes needed for the melodic and harmonic versions of the scale are written in with accidentals as necessary. The E-sharp harmonic minor and melodic minor scales are:

The scale-degree chords of E-sharp minor are:

- Tonic – E-sharp minor
- Supertonic – F-double-sharp diminished
- Mediant – G-sharp major
- Subdominant – A-sharp minor
- Dominant – B-sharp minor
- Submediant – C-sharp major
- Subtonic – D-sharp major

Although E-sharp minor is usually notated as F minor, it could be used on a local level, such as bars 17 to 22 in Johann Sebastian Bach's The Well-Tempered Clavier, Book 1, Prelude and Fugue in C-sharp major, BWV 848. (E-sharp minor is the mediant minor key of C-sharp major.)

In tuning systems where the number of notes per octave is not a multiple of 12, notes such as E♯ and F are not enharmonically equivalent, nor are the corresponding key signatures. These tunings can produce keys with no analogue in 12-tone equal temperament, which can require double sharps, double flats, or microtonal alterations in key signatures. For example, the key of E-sharp minor, with eight sharps, is equivalent to F minor in 12-tone equal temperament, but in 19-tone equal temperament, it is equivalent to F-flat minor instead, with 11 flats.

== See also ==
- Key (music)
- Major and minor
- Chord (music)
- Chord notation
- Key signature § Double flats and sharps

== Notes ==
No.	Flats		Sharps	
No.	Major	minor	Major	minor
0	C	a	C	a
1	F	d	G	e
2	B♭	g	D	b
3	E♭	c	A	f♯
4	A♭	f	E	c♯
5	D♭	b♭	B	g♯
6	G♭	e♭	F♯	d♯
7	C♭	a♭	C♯	a♯
8	F♭	d♭	G♯	e♯
