= Six sharps =

Six sharps may refer to:

- F-sharp major, a major musical key with six sharps
- D-sharp minor, a minor musical key with six sharps
