= D-sharp minor =

Minor scale based on D-sharp

- Relative key: F-sharp major
- Parallel key: D-sharp major →enharmonic: E-flat major
- Dominant key: A-sharp minor
- Subdominant key: G-sharp minor
- Enharmonic key: E-flat minor

Component pitches
- D♯, E♯, F♯, G♯, A♯, B, C♯

D-sharp minor is a minor scale based on D♯, consisting of the pitches D♯, E♯, F♯, G♯, A♯, B, and C♯. Its key signature has six sharps.

Its relative major is F-sharp major. Its parallel major, D-sharp major, is normally rewritten as E-flat major, since D-sharp major's two double-sharps make it generally impractical to use. Its enharmonic equivalent, E-flat minor, has the same number of flats as the number of sharps in D-sharp minor.

The D-sharp natural minor scale is:

Changes needed for the melodic and harmonic versions of the scale are written in with accidentals as necessary. The D-sharp harmonic minor and melodic minor scales are:

== Scale degree chords ==
The scale degree chords of D-sharp minor are:

- Tonic – D-sharp minor
- Supertonic – E-sharp diminished
- Mediant – F-sharp major
- Subdominant – G-sharp minor
- Dominant – A-sharp minor
- Submediant – B major
- Subtonic – C-sharp major

== Music in D-sharp minor ==
D-sharp minor is infrequently used as the principal key of pieces in the Classical era. More common is notation in E-flat minor, which is a relatively manageable key for many brass instruments and woodwinds. In the 24 canonic keys, most of the composers preferred E-flat minor, while Johann Sebastian Bach, Sergei Lyapunov, and Manuel Ponce preferred D-sharp minor.

From Bach's The Well-Tempered Clavier, the eighth fugue from Book 1 and the eighth prelude and fugue from Book 2 are in D-sharp minor; both fugues end with a Picardy third, requiring an F in the final D-sharp major chord.

The second of Lyapunov's 12 Transcendental Études ("Ronde des Fantômes") is also in D-sharp minor.

Alexander Scriabin's Etude Op. 8, No. 12 is in this key, perhaps the most famous example.

The second movement from Charles-Valentin Alkan's Grande sonate 'Les quatre âges', subtitled Quasi-Faust, is also in D-sharp minor (but ends in F-sharp major), and modulates into even sharper keys along the way, some even being keys with double sharps or beyond, such as G-sharp major and D-sharp major.

In a few scores, 6-sharp key signatures in the bass clef are written with the sharp for the A on the top line.

Despite the key rarely being used in orchestral music other than to modulate, it is not entirely uncommon in keyboard music. For orchestration of piano music, some theorists recommend transposing the music to D minor or E minor. If D-sharp minor must absolutely be used, one should take care that B♭ wind instruments be notated in F minor, rather than E-sharp minor (or G instruments used instead, giving a transposed key of G-sharp minor), and B♮ instruments in E minor, in order to avoid double sharps in key signatures. Meanwhile, the E horns would have parts written with a B minor key signature. Instruments in F can be written in A-sharp minor but it is more recommended to use B-flat minor for them.

No.	Flats		Sharps	
No.	Major	minor	Major	minor
0	C	a	C	a
1	F	d	G	e
2	B♭	g	D	b
3	E♭	c	A	f♯
4	A♭	f	E	c♯
5	D♭	b♭	B	g♯
6	G♭	e♭	F♯	d♯
7	C♭	a♭	C♯	a♯
8	F♭	d♭	G♯	e♯
