= F-sharp minor =

Musical scale

- Relative key: A major
- Parallel key: F-sharp major
- Dominant key: C-sharp minor
- Subdominant key: B minor

Component pitches
- F♯, G♯, A, B, C♯, D, E

F-sharp minor is a minor scale based on F♯, consisting of the pitches F♯, G♯, A, B, C♯, D, and E. Its key signature has three sharps. Its relative major is A major and its parallel major is F-sharp major (or enharmonically G-flat major).

The F-sharp natural minor scale is:

Changes needed for the melodic and harmonic versions of the scale are written in with accidentals as necessary. The F-sharp harmonic minor and melodic minor scales are:

== Scale degree chords ==
The scale degree chords of F-sharp minor are:

- Tonic – F-sharp minor
- Supertonic – G-sharp diminished
- Mediant – A major
- Subdominant – B minor
- Dominant – C-sharp minor
- Submediant – D major
- Subtonic – E major

== Music in F-sharp minor ==
Very few symphonies are written in this key, Haydn's "Farewell Symphony" being one famous example. George Frederick Bristow and Dora Pejačević wrote symphonies in this key.

The few concertos written in this key are usually written for the composer himself to play, including Rachmaninoff's Piano Concerto No. 1, Scriabin's Piano Concerto, Wieniawski's Violin Concerto No. 1, Vieuxtemps's Violin Concerto No. 2, Bernhard Romberg's Cello Concerto Op. 30 and Koussevitzky's Double Bass Concerto.

In addition to the "Farewell Symphony", Haydn's Piano Trio No. 40 (Hob. XV:26) and the fourth quartet from the 'Prussian' Quartets are in F-sharp minor.

More prominent keyboard pieces written in F-sharp minor include Handel's Keyboard Suite HWV 431, Carl Philipp Emanuel Bach's Fantasia H. 300, Carel Anton Fodor's Sonata Op. 2/2, Muzio Clementi's Piano Sonata Op. 25/5, Dussek's Sonata Op. 61 ('Élégie Harmonique'), Ignaz Moscheles's Sonate mélancolique, Op. 49, Hélène de Montgeroult's Piano Sonata Op. 5/3, Schumann's Sonata No. 1 in F-sharp minor (1833–35), Liszt's Hungarian Rhapsody No.2 second movement "Friska", Clara Schumann's Prelude and Fugue ICS 18, Chopin's Polonaise in F♯ minor, Scriabin's Third Sonata, and Ravel's Sonatine. The slow movement of Beethoven's Hammerklavier piano sonata is written in this key.

Aside from a prelude and fugue from each of the two books of The Well-Tempered Clavier, Bach's only other work in F-sharp minor is the toccata BWV 910. Mozart's only composition in this key is the second movement to his Piano Concerto No. 23 in A major.

F-sharp minor is sometimes used as the parallel minor of G-flat major, especially since G-flat major's real parallel minor, G-flat minor, would have nine flats including two double-flats. For example, in the middle section of his seventh Humoresque in G-flat major, Antonín Dvořák switches from G-flat major to F-sharp minor for the middle section in the parallel minor.

== Notable classical compositions in F-sharp minor ==
- Charles-Valentin Alkan
  - Concerto for Solo Piano: Allegretto alla barbaresca
- Johannes Brahms
  - Piano Sonata No. 2, Op. 2
  - Hungarian Dances Nos. 5 & 17 (original version for 4-hands )
- Norbert Burgmüller
  - Piano Concerto Op. 1 in F-sharp minor
- Frédéric Chopin
  - Polonaise in F-sharp minor, Op. 44
  - Nocturne, Op. 48, No. 2
  - Mazurka, Op. 59, No. 3
  - Prelude No. 8 in F-sharp minor, Op. 28/8
- Louis Couperin
  - Bauyn manuscript: Pavane in F-sharp minor
- Ernst von Dohnányi
  - Suite in F-sharp minor
- George Enescu
  - Piano Sonata No. 1, Op. 24, No. 1 (1924)
- Gabriel Fauré
  - Pavane, Op. 50
- César Franck
  - Symphonic Variations
  - Les Djinns
- Joseph Haydn
  - Symphony No. 45 (Farewell)
  - Piano Trio No. 40, Hob. XV:26
- Johann Nepomuk Hummel
  - Piano Sonata No. 5 in F-sharp minor, Op. 81
- Franz Liszt
  - Friska beginning and ending of Hungarian Rhapsody No. 2
  - Hungarian Rhapsody No.8
  - Hungarian Rhapsody No.18
- Mykola Lysenko
  - Elegie Op. 41/3
- Felix Mendelssohn
  - Fantasy in F-sharp minor, Op. 28, ("Sonate Éccossaise")
- Sergei Rachmaninoff
  - Piano Concerto No. 1, Op. 1
  - Prelude in F-sharp minor No. 1, Op. 23
- Maurice Ravel
  - Sonatine
- Gioachino Rossini
  - Preludio religioso from Petite messe solennelle
- Franz Schubert
  - Piano Sonata in F-sharp minor, D 571 (incomplete)
- Robert Schumann
  - Piano Sonata No. 1, Op. 11
- Alexander Scriabin
  - Piano Concerto, Op. 20
  - Piano Sonata No. 3, Op. 23
- Dmitri Shostakovich
  - Prelude and Fugue No. 8, Op. 87
  - String Quartet No. 7, Op. 108
- Igor Stravinsky
  - Piano Sonata (1903–04)
- Pyotr Ilyich Tchaikovsky
  - Danse des petits cygnes (from his ballet Swan Lake)
- Georg Philipp Telemann
  - Fantasy for Solo Flute No. 10
- Henryk Wieniawski
  - Violin Concerto No. 1, Op. 14

No.	Flats		Sharps	
No.	Major	minor	Major	minor
0	C	a	C	a
1	F	d	G	e
2	B♭	g	D	b
3	E♭	c	A	f♯
4	A♭	f	E	c♯
5	D♭	b♭	B	g♯
6	G♭	e♭	F♯	d♯
7	C♭	a♭	C♯	a♯
8	F♭	d♭	G♯	e♯
