= B-sharp =

B-sharp or B♯ refers to:

- B♯ (musical note), musical pitch
- B-sharp major, enharmonic to C major
- B-sharp minor, enharmonic to C minor
