= Seven sharps =

Seven sharps may refer to:

- C-sharp major, a major musical key with seven sharps
- A-sharp minor, a minor musical key with seven sharps
- Seven Sharp, a New Zealand current affairs show
