= Three sharps =

Three sharps may refer to:

- A major, a major musical key with three sharps
- F-sharp minor, a minor musical key with three sharps
