= Four sharps =

Four sharps may refer to:

- E major, a major musical key with four sharps
- C-sharp minor, a minor musical key with four sharps
