= C-sharp minor =

Minor key and scale based on C-sharp

- Relative key: E major
- Parallel key: C-sharp major
- Dominant key: G-sharp minor
- Subdominant key: F-sharp minor

Component pitches
- C♯, D♯, E, F♯, G♯, A, B

C-sharp minor is a minor scale based on C♯, with the pitches C♯, D♯, E, F♯, G♯, A, and B. Its key signature consists of four sharps.

The C-sharp natural minor scale is:

Changes needed for the melodic and harmonic versions of the scale are written in with accidentals as necessary. The C-sharp harmonic minor and melodic minor scales are:

Its relative major is E major. Its parallel major, C-sharp major, would require seven sharps and is usually written as the enharmonic key of D-flat major instead, with five flats.

== Scale degree chords ==
The scale degree chords of C-sharp minor are:

- Tonic – C-sharp minor
- Supertonic – D-sharp diminished
- Mediant – E major
- Subdominant – F-sharp minor
- Dominant – G-sharp minor
- Submediant – A major
- Subtonic – B major

== Classical music in this key ==
There are only two known symphonies in the 18th century written in this key. One of them is by Joseph Martin Kraus, who appears to have found the key difficult since he later rewrote it in C minor. In the following two centuries, C-sharp minor symphonies remained rare. Notable examples are the second movement Adagio of Anton Bruckner's Symphony No. 7, the first movement of Gustav Mahler's Symphony No. 5 and Prokofiev's Symphony No. 7.

This key occurs more often in piano literature from the 18th century onwards. Domenico Scarlatti wrote just two keyboard sonatas in C-sharp minor, K. 246 and K. 247. After Beethoven's Piano Sonata No. 14 (Moonlight Sonata), the key became more frequent in the piano repertoire. Beethoven himself used this key again in the outer movements of his String Quartet No. 14 (Op. 131, 1826). Even so, Johannes Brahms still felt the need to rewrite his C-sharp minor piano quartet in C minor, which was published as Piano Quartet No. 3 in C minor, Op. 60. The last intermezzo from his Three Intermezzi for piano, Op. 117 is in C-sharp minor.

Alkan composed the second movement (Adagio) for Concerto for Solo Piano in C-sharp minor.

Frédéric Chopin often wrote in this key: examples include the Fantaisie-Impromptu, Études Op. 10, No. 4 and Op. 25, No. 7, Scherzo No. 3 (Op. 39), Waltz Op. 64, No. 2, Polonaise Op. 26 No. 1, the Prelude opus 45 and Nocturnes No. 7 (Op. 27, No. 1) and No. 20 (Lento con gran espressione). More examples of works in C-sharp minor include Rachmaninoff's Prelude in C-sharp minor (Op. 3, No. 2), Scriabin's Étude in C-sharp minor, Op. 2, No. 1, Franz Liszt's Hungarian Rhapsody No. 2, and Tchaikovsky's Piano Sonata in C-sharp minor.

Piano concertos written in C-sharp minor include Poulenc's Piano Concerto in C-sharp minor, FP 146 (1949), Erich Wolfgang Korngold's Piano Concerto for the Left Hand, Op. 17, Nikolai Rimsky-Korsakov's Piano Concerto, and others by Ferdinand Ries, Xaver Scharwenka, Amy Beach, Miriam Hyde and Issay Dobrowen.

Franz Berwald and Dimitri Shostakovich wrote violin concertos in C-sharp minor.

Jules Van Nuffel wrote his psalm setting In convertendo Dominus for choir and organ in C-sharp minor.

C-sharp minor is often used as the parallel minor of D-flat major, especially since D-flat major's real parallel minor, D-flat minor, would have eight flats including one double-flat. For example, in his Prelude No. 15 in D-flat major ("Raindrop"), Frédéric Chopin switches from D-flat major to C-sharp minor for the middle section in the parallel minor, while in his Fantaisie-Impromptu and Scherzo No. 3, primarily in C-sharp minor, he switches to D-flat major for the middle section for the opposite reason. Claude Debussy likewise switches from D-flat major to C-sharp minor in the significant section in his famous "Clair de lune" for a few measures. Antonín Dvořák's New World Symphony also switches to C-sharp minor for a while for the significant section in the slow movement.

== See also ==
- Key (music)
- Major and minor
- Chord (music)
- Chord notation
- D flat minor

No.	Flats		Sharps	
No.	Major	minor	Major	minor
0	C	a	C	a
1	F	d	G	e
2	B♭	g	D	b
3	E♭	c	A	f♯
4	A♭	f	E	c♯
5	D♭	b♭	B	g♯
6	G♭	e♭	F♯	d♯
7	C♭	a♭	C♯	a♯
8	F♭	d♭	G♯	e♯
