= Piano Sonata No. 1 (Schumann) =

1835 composition by Robert Schumann

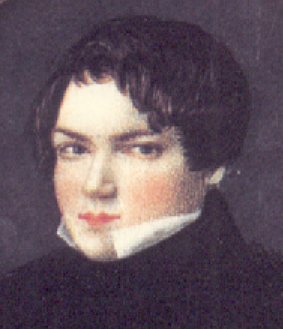
Robert Schumann in 1830

Movements 1–4
Digital piano capture (20:23)

The Piano Sonata No. 1 in F♯ minor, Op. 11, was composed by Robert Schumann from 1833 to 1835. He published it anonymously as "Pianoforte Sonata, dedicated to Clara by Florestan and Eusebius" (his alter egos).

Eric Frederick Jensen describes the sonata as 'the most unconventional and the most intriguing' of Schumann's piano sonatas due to its unusual structure. The Aria in the second movement is based on his earlier Lied setting, "An Anna" or "Nicht im Tale". Schumann later told his wife, Clara, that the sonata was "a solitary outcry for you from my heart ... in which your theme appears in every possible shape".

The four movements are as follows:

1. Introduzione: Un poco adagio – Allegro vivace (F♯ minor)
2. Aria: Senza passione, ma espressivo (A major)
3. Scherzo: Allegrissimo (F♯ minor) – Intermezzo: Lento. Alla burla, ma pomposo (D major) – Tempo I
4. Finale: Allegro, un poco maestoso (F♯ minor, ending in F♯ major)
