= C-sharp major =

Musical scale and key signature

- Relative key: A-sharp minor
- Parallel key: C-sharp minor
- Dominant key: G-sharp major →enharmonic : A-flat major
- Subdominant key: F-sharp major
- Enharmonic key: D-flat major

Component pitches
- C♯, D♯, E♯, F♯, G♯, A♯, B♯

C-sharp major is a major scale based on C♯, consisting of the pitches C♯, D♯, E♯, F♯, G♯, A♯, and B♯. Its key signature has seven sharps. Its relative minor is A-sharp minor, its parallel minor is C-sharp minor, and its enharmonic equivalent is D-flat major.

The C-sharp major scale is:

Changes needed for the melodic and harmonic versions of the scale are written in with accidentals as necessary. The C-sharp harmonic major and melodic major scales are:

A harp tuned to C-sharp major has all its pedals in the bottom position. Because all the strings are then pinched and shortened, this is the least resonant key for the instrument.

== Scale degree chords ==
The scale degree chords of C-sharp major are:

- Tonic – C-sharp major
- Supertonic – D-sharp minor
- Mediant – E-sharp minor
- Subdominant – F-sharp major
- Dominant – G-sharp major
- Submediant – A-sharp minor
- Leading-tone – B-sharp diminished

== Compositions ==
Most composers prefer to use the enharmonic equivalent D-flat major since it contains five flats as opposed to C-sharp major's seven sharps. However, Johann Sebastian Bach chose C-sharp major for Prelude and Fugue No. 3 in both books of The Well-Tempered Clavier. In Hungarian Rhapsody No. 6, Franz Liszt takes the unusual step of changing the key from D-flat major to C-sharp major near the start of the piece, and then back again to B-flat minor (the relative minor of D-flat major). Maurice Ravel selected C-sharp major as the tonic key of "Ondine" from his piano suite Gaspard de la nuit. Erich Wolfgang Korngold composed his Piano Concerto for the Left Hand, Op. 17, in C-sharp major.

The Allegro de concierto by Spanish composer Enrique Granados is written in C-sharp major. Canadian composer and pianist Frank Mills originally wrote and performed his instrumental hit "Music Box Dancer" in C-sharp major; however, most modern piano editions have the piece written in C major.

Louis Vierne used C-sharp major for the "Dona nobis pacem" of the Agnus Dei of his Messe solennelle in C-sharp minor.

No.	Flats		Sharps	
No.	Major	minor	Major	minor
0	C	a	C	a
1	F	d	G	e
2	B♭	g	D	b
3	E♭	c	A	f♯
4	A♭	f	E	c♯
5	D♭	b♭	B	g♯
6	G♭	e♭	F♯	d♯
7	C♭	a♭	C♯	a♯
8	F♭	d♭	G♯	e♯
