= Slow movement (music) =

A slow movement is a form in a multi-movement musical piece. Generally, the second movement of a piece will be written as a slow movement, although composers occasionally write other movements as a slow movement as well. The tempo of a slow movement can vary from largo to andante, though occasionally allegretto slow movements can be found, especially in works by Beethoven. It is usually in the relative, parallel, dominant, or subdominant key of the musical work's main key, but also in any variation or combination of them; the subdominant of the relative major is common in Classical-era minor-key sonatas or symphonies.

== Overview ==
The general layout of a four-movement piece is as follows:

1. A fast movement, written in sonata form
2. A slow movement
3. A minuet or scherzo
4. A faster movement, usually a rondo or other sonata form

However, composers sometimes remove, add or re-arrange movements, such as Beethoven's Moonlight Sonata, which begins with the slow movement. When a piece has additional movements, they may also be written as slow movements.

== Form ==
A slow movement is usually written in one of three forms: compound or "large" ternary, sonata form, and theme and variations.

=== Large ternary ===
Large ternary is the most common form used for a slow movement. It consists of three parts, labeled ABA. The first and third part are almost identical, whereas the middle part is contrasting. If the starting key is a major key, the middle part is typically written in a minor key; if the starting key is a minor key, the middle part is typically written in a major key. The keys do not have to have the same tonic. If the middle part is written in a major key, it is often labeled Maggiore. If it is written in a minor key, then it is labeled Minore. The final part is always a return of the first part, but frequently has additional ornaments and small phrases added on.

=== Sonata form ===
While sonata form is often used for the first movements of symphonies, many composers have also used it for the slow movements as well: an example of a slow movement in sonata form is the second movement of Mozart's Symphony No. 40.

Occasionally the development is omitted and replaced with a simple transition, leaving the exposition and recapitulation: this is sometimes referred to as sonatina form, or a Type I sonata in sonata theory. One example of the piece in sonata form without development is the second movement of Beethoven's Piano Sonata No. 17, "The Tempest". Some of these sonatina-form movements, however, may contain development-like sections within the recapitulation, such as the second movement of Brahms' Symphony no. 4.

=== Theme and variations ===
Theme and variations form starts with a theme, followed by multiple variations. This theme is usually eight to thirty-two bars in length, and may be constructed as a musical sentence, period, or small ternary. Each variation is a recurrence of the theme with melodic, harmonic, rhythmic and ornamental changes.

Theme and variations sometimes contain one Minore variation. This variation will have a contrasting tonality, and may be different in form from the theme.

Theme and variations may also have a coda to finalize the piece. It may bring back the original theme with few or no changes, in order to create symmetry.

== See also ==
- Sonata
