= List of symphonies in B major =

The list of symphonies in B major includes:

- Robert Farnon
  - Symphony in B "Ottawa" (1943)
- Ruth Gipps
  - Symphony No. 2
- Joseph Haydn
  - Symphony No. 46 (1772)
- Jef van Hoof
  - Symphony No. 4 (1950)
- Erich Wolfgang Korngold
  - Sinfonietta, Op. 5 (1912)
- George Lloyd
  - Symphony No.4 "Arctic" (1945-6)
- Georg Matthias Monn
  - Sinfonia (1740s)
- Dmitri Shostakovich
  - Symphony No. 2 "To October", Op. 14 (1927)
- Leo Sowerby
  - Symphony No. 2 (1928)
- Charles Tournemire
  - Symphony No. 2, Op. 36
- Rued Langgaard
  - Symphony No.3 "The Flush of Youth" a.k.a "La Melodia" (1915-6, rev 1926, 1934)
