= Paul Büttner =

German musician (1870–1943)

Paul Büttner (10 December 1870 – 15 October 1943) was a German choir director, music critic, music educator and composer of the late Romantic period.

== Biography ==
Born in Dresden, Paul Büttner's parents originally came from the Eastern Ore Mountains. The father worked in a glass factory in Löbtau. Büttner wrote his first smaller compositions at the age of eight. After school he was given a place at the Dresden Conservatory. He first studied oboe and then took composition lessons from Felix Draeseke, whose most prominent pupil he became.

His father's death made him responsible for the upkeep of his family. Büttner earned the money he needed by playing as an oboist in various smaller dance orchestras.

After Paul Büttner became head of various workers' choirs, he worked from 1896 to 1907 as a choir conductor at the Dresden Conservatory. From 1905 he was given the post of federal conductor of the Dresden Workers' Association. In 1909, he married the journalist Eva Malzmann.

He worked for 21 years from 1912 as a music critic for the social democratic Dresdner Volkszeitung. In 1917 he received the title of professor, and was finally appointed artistic director of the Dresden Conservatory in 1924.

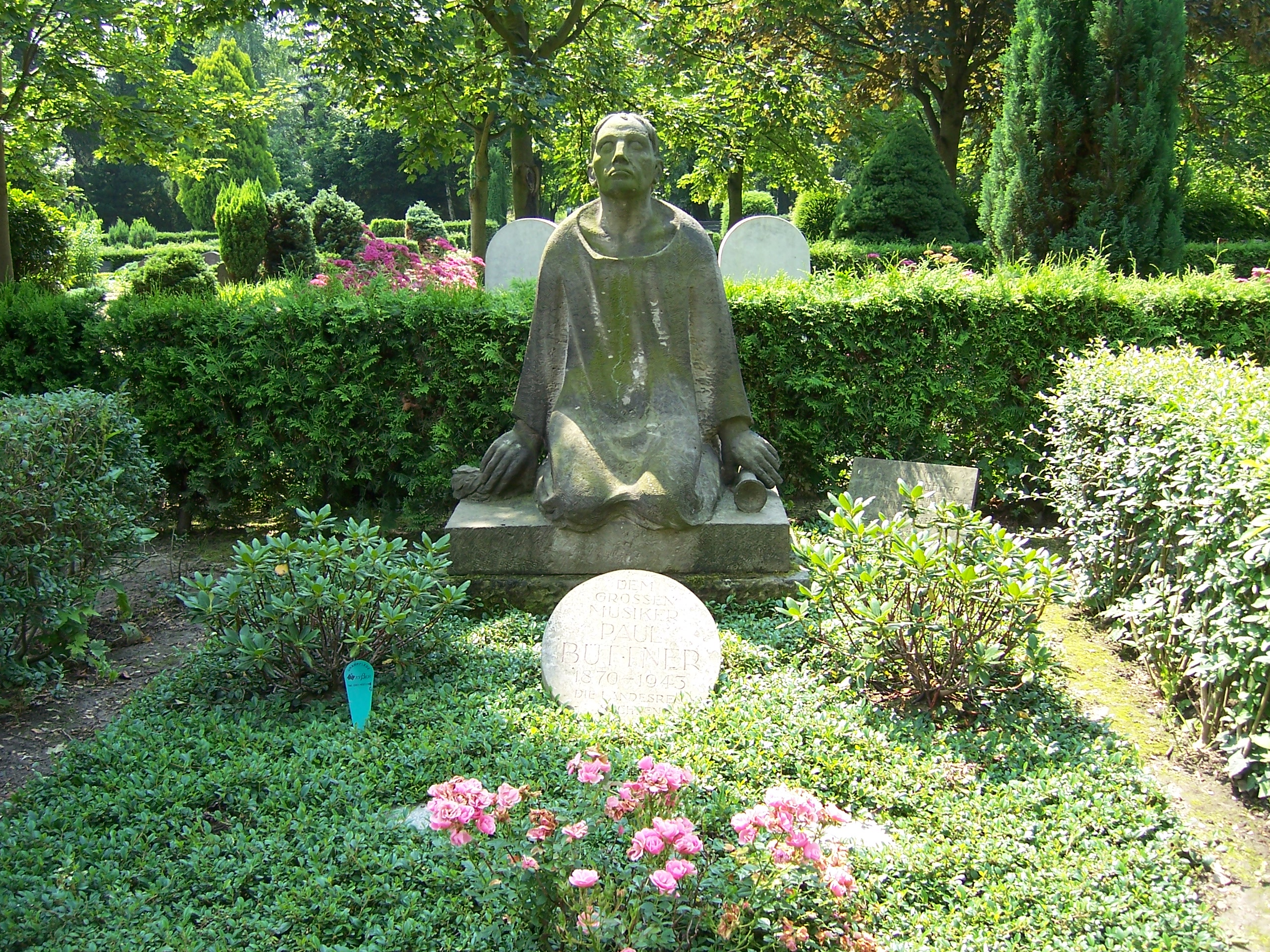
Paul Büttner's tombstone in Dresden.

When the National Socialists came to power in 1933, Paul Büttner was relieved of all his offices. He was ostracized, and the performance of his works prohibited, because of his political activity in previous years and because of his Jewish wife. He died in poverty on 15 October 1943 in Dresden. His grave is on the Neuer Annenfriedhof in Dresden.

== Style ==
Büttner is one of the last symphonic composers in the direct succession of Anton Bruckner, along with such colleagues as Richard Wetz. Other important influences include Johannes Brahms and his teacher Draeseke. He wrote vocal works, chamber music and symphonic works. The influence of Richard Wagner can also be heard in his music. His most important compositions are his four symphonies.

== Legacy and recordings ==
Paul Büttner's estate was looked after by his wife Eva until her death in 1969. Afterwards it was administered by Büttner's daughter, who in 1982 transferred it to the Saxon State and University Library Dresden (SLUB). It contains compositions by Büttner with 48 catalog numbers and 12 volumes of music reviews, which Büttner wrote for the Sächsische Volkszeitung Dresden.

Büttner was largely forgotten after his death; although politically "reliable" for the GDR régime, his music was too anachronistic to be adopted by its artistic élites. Consequently, there are few commercial recordings of Büttner's work. The Fourth Symphony and the Heroic Overture received a recording by the Swedish Sterling label in 1996; his other symphonies, although never released on CD, can be heard on YouTube.

== Selected works ==
=== Opera ===
- Menasche – Das Wunder der Isis
- Anka
- Rumpelstilzchen

=== Orchestral ===
- Symphony No. 1 in F major (1898)
- Symphony No. 2 in G major (1908)
- Symphony No. 3 in D flat major (1915)
- Symphony No. 4 in B minor (1918)
- Prelude, Fugue and Epilogue Eine Vision (1920)
- Heroic Overture in C major (1925)
- Overture in B minor (1929)
- Slavic dance, idyll and fugue (1932)
- Concert piece for violin and orchestra in G major (1937; Score)
- Overture to Napoleon oder die hundert Tage (Napoleon, or the Hundred Days) by Christian Dietrich Grabbe
- Das Wunder der Isis, burleske
- Der Krieg (The War), Fantasy for Orchestra
- Elegy for small orchestra
- Über ein Deutsches Volkslied (On a German Folk Song), Fantasy for Orchestra

=== Choral ===
- Heut' und Ewig (from: Des Knaben Wunderhorn) for children's choir, soloists and orchestra (1919)

=== For brass band ===
- Saturnalia, for brass and percussion

=== Chamber music ===
- String Quartet in G minor (1914; Score)
- Violin Sonata in C minor (1917; Score)
- String Trio in the form of a Canon (1919)
- 2 further Violin Sonatas
- Six Argentinean Tangos
- Trio sonate Trio sonata for violin, viola and violoncello (canons with inversions in double counterpoint of the duodecime)

== Discography ==
- Berlin Radio Symphony Orchestra, conducted by Hans Peter Frank en Gerhard Pflüger, Symphony No. 4 in B minor, Heroic Overture, Sterling CDS 1048-2, ADD, Originally recorded 1965 (Symphony) and 1974 (Overture).

== Writings ==
- Paul Büttner: Musikgrundlehre. Ein Lehr- und Lernbuch (Berlin: Springer, 1908).
