= List of symphonies in D-flat major =

The list of symphonies in D♭ major includes:

- Paul Büttner
  - Symphony No. 3 (1915)
- Erwin Dressel
  - Symphony in D♭ major (1928)
- Anastazy Wilhelm Dreszer
  - Symphony No. 1, Op. 3 (1865)
- Howard Hanson
  - Symphony No. 2 "Romantic", Op. 30 (1930)
- Nikolai Myaskovsky
  - Symphony No. 25, Op. 69 (1946)
- Ture Rangström
  - Symphony No. 3 "Sång under stjärnorna" (1929)
