= Scherzo No. 2 (Chopin) =

Composition for piano by Frédéric Chopin

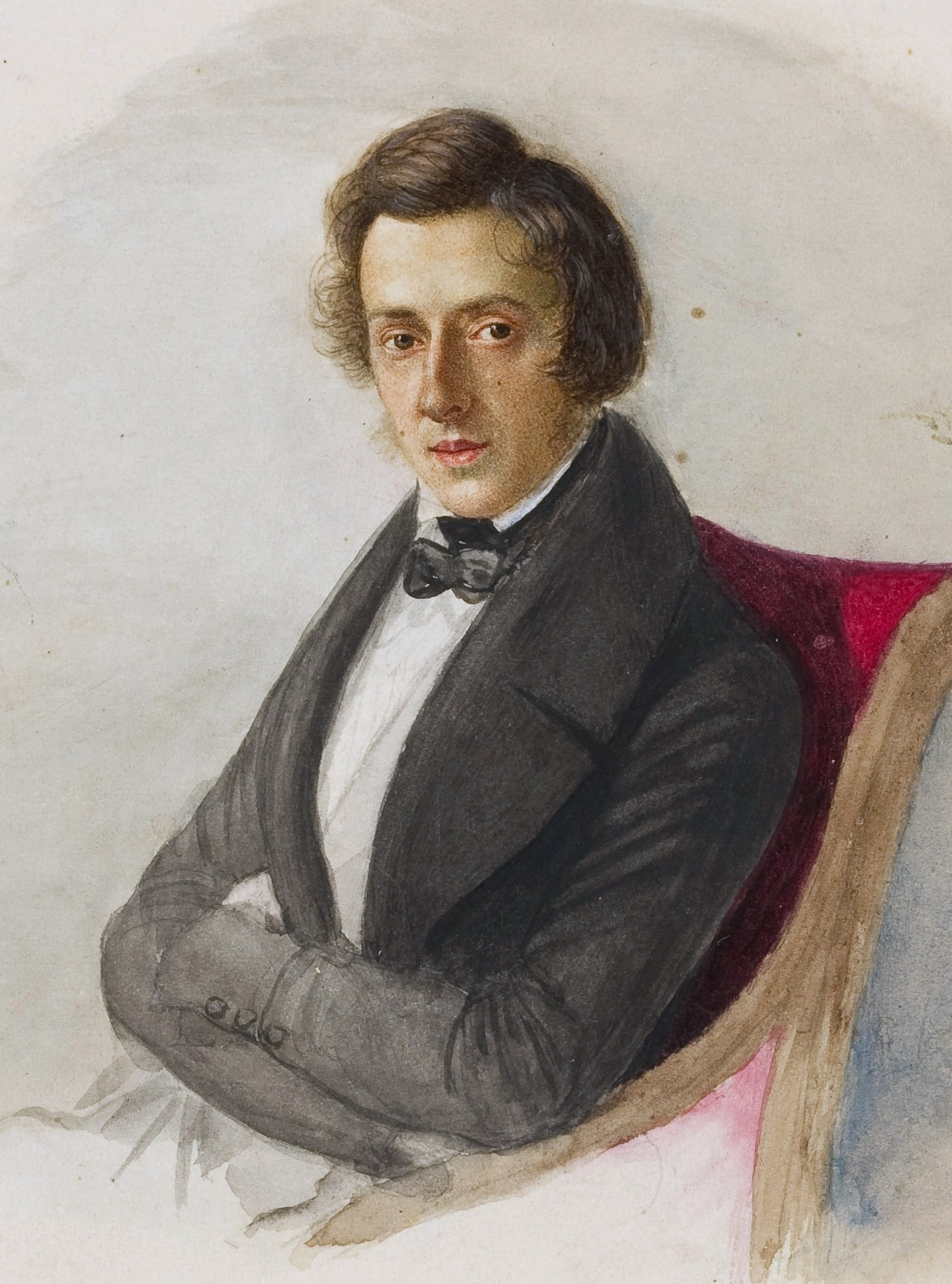
Frédéric Chopin at 25, by his fiancée Maria Wodzińska, 1835

Scherzo No. 2 in B♭ minor, Op. 31, played by Alice Gi-Young Hwang

The Scherzo No. 2 in B♭ minor, Op. 31 is a scherzo by Frédéric Chopin. The work was composed and published between 1835 and 1837, and was dedicated to Countess Adèle Fürstenstein. As pianist David Dubal has written, Robert Schumann compared this scherzo to a Byronic poem, "so overflowing with tenderness, boldness, love and contempt." According to Wilhelm von Lenz, a pupil of Chopin, the composer said that the renowned sotto voce opening was a question and the second phrase the answer: "For Chopin it was never questioning enough, never soft enough, never vaulted (tombe) enough. It must be a charnel-house." Dubal wrote that critic James Huneker "exults": "What masterly writing, and it lies in the very heart of the piano! A hundred generations may not improve on these pages."

== Structure ==
The beginning is marked Presto and opens in B♭ minor. However, most of the work is written in D♭ major. The opening to the piece consists of two arpeggiated pianissimo chords, and after a moment's pause, goes into a set of fortissimo chords, before returning to the quiet arpeggiated chords. The piece then goes to an arpeggio section which leads to the con anima. Then, the middle section appears in A major. After the middle section ends (modulating in B♭ minor), the first section reappears with a coda.

== In popular culture ==
The Scherzo No. 2, among other pieces by Chopin, is heard in the Woody Woodpecker episode "Musical Moments From Chopin". A fragment is also heard in Witness to Murder, with Barbara Stanwyck.
