= Fantasie, Op. 28 (Mendelssohn) =

Felix Mendelssohn's Fantasie in F♯ minor, Op. 28 is a solo piano work, written in three movements to be played without pause. This work is also known as Sonata écossaise (Scottish Sonata). The first movement is marked by an Allegro in F♯ minor in a loose sonata form, then an Allegro con moto in A major, and the final movement returns to F♯ minor, in sonata form with double-bar. Its final version dates from 1833; the original version was probably composed as early as 1828.
