= Symphony No. 46 (Haydn) =

Symphony by Joseph Haydn

Joseph Haydn

Joseph Haydn's Symphony No. 46 in B major, Hoboken I/46, was composed in 1772, during his Sturm und Drang period.

== Music ==
The work is scored for two oboes, bassoon, two horns and strings.

The work is written in standard four-movement form:

1. Vivace, 4/4
2. Poco adagio in B minor, 6/8
3. Menuet e Trio (Trio in B minor): Allegretto, 3/4
4. Finale: Presto e scherzando, 2/2

The key of B major, which is highly unusual in the Classical period, sets the tone of the work, which is one of unease, restlessness and searching.

The first movement starts with a four-note motif in unison, reminiscent of Symphony No. 44 (Trauer), but quasi-inverted. It is developed in various keys, with frequent modulations into the minor and to other remote keys. In a deliberate 'surprise', the movement seems to enter the recapitulation seconds after the development begins, before jumping back to a dramatic development passage. The recapitulation continues the development still further, moving into dissonance, before an abrupt ending.

The second movement is in B minor. It is a rhapsodic pastorale, rocking along over a running figure in the bass, with a syncopated figure in the muted violins maintaining the tension.

The minuet is more assertive in tone, but its confidence is undermined by a plaintive, almost solemn, trio, again in B minor. The trio is "tuneless", similar to the Trio of the minuet in Symphony No. 29, and Haydn may have intended for a solo instrument to improvise a theme over the accompaniment.

Many of Haydn’s symphonies contain more startling surprises than the one which has made his Surprise Symphony famous. The surprise here comes in the final movement. The opening is a typical energetic theme in the violins which is rapidly taken up and developed, with the horns prominent. The music rushes on only to break off suddenly, interrupted by the closing passage of the minuet, followed by the repeat of the whole of the second half of the minuet. The horns then burst in again with the main finale theme, but fade away and the music stutters almost to a halt. Then, on an underlying pedal on the horns, the strings take the movement and symphony to a rapid and abrupt close. Although it is not known if he was familiar with this symphony, Ludwig van Beethoven would later do the same thing in the finale of his Fifth Symphony, interrupting the work with a reprise of material from the preceding movement before returning to the current movement's theme.

Since all of the movements have the same tonic, the work is homotonal.

== Discography ==
In Haydn's time, this symphony required the use of horns crooked in B natural. Except for period instrument performances, the horn players now use valve horns, and perform the transposition from horns in B♮ to horns in F or B♭ in their minds. In many recordings, the players read their parts as if for horns in B basso rather than B alto. It is unclear which octave the composer wanted, but strong evidence from within the score indicates basso.
