= List of compositions by Vincent d'Indy =

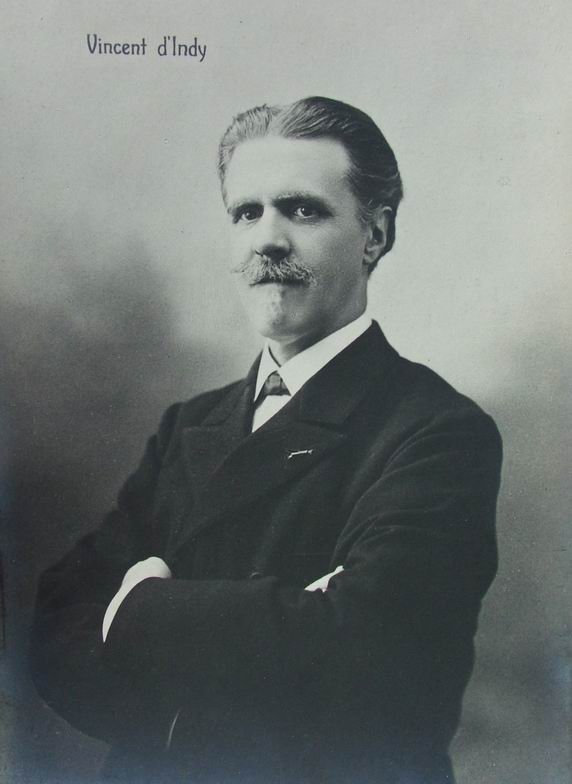
Vincent d'Indy, ca. 1895

This is a list of compositions by Vincent d'Indy.

== Works with opus number ==
- Op. 1, Piano Sonata in C minor (1869)
- Op. 2, La chanson des aventuriers de la mer for male voices, piano, and string quintet after Victor Hugo (1872)
- Op. 3, Attente, song for voice and piano after Hugo (1871)
- Op. 4, Madrigal, song for voice and piano after Robert de Bonnières (1872)
- Op. 5, Jean Hundaye, symphony (1874-5) [cf. John Hunyadi] (rejected by composer)
- Op. 6, Antoine et Cléopâtre, overture after William Shakespeare (1876)
- Op. 7, Piano Quartet in A minor (1878–88)
- Op. 8, La Forêt enchantée (Harald), symphonic legend after Uhland (1878)
- Op. 9, Petite sonate dans la forme classique for piano (1880)
- Op. 10, Plainte de Thécla, song after de Bonnières and Friedrich Schiller (1880)
- Op. 11, Au galop (Melodie espagnole), song after de Bonnières (1876-9)
- Op. 12, Wallenstein, three symphonic overtures after Schiller's Wallenstein (1870–81)
  - No. 1 Le camp
  - No. 2 Les piccolomini
  - No. 3 La mort de Wallenstein
- Op. 13, Clair de lune, song for soprano and piano after Victor Hugo (1872), orch. (1881)
- Op. 14, Attendez-moi sous l'orme, opéra-comique in one act after J. Prével (1876–82)
- Op. 15, Poème des montagnes, symphonic poem for piano (1881)
- Op. 16, Quatre pièces for piano (1882)
- Op. 17, Helvétia, three waltzes for piano (1882)
- Op. 18, Le chant de la cloche, legend dramatique with prologue and seven scenes, text by d'Indy after Schiller, for solo voices, double chorus, and orchestra (1879–83), also adapted for stage
- Op. 19, Lied for cello/viola and orchestra (1884)
- Op. 20, L'amour et la crane, song for voice and piano after Charles Baudelaire (1884)
- Op. 21, Saugefleurie, legend for orchestra after de Bonnières (1884)
- Op. 22, Cantate Domino, canticle for three voices and organ (1885)
- Op. 23, Sainte Marie-Madeleine, cantata for soprano, female voices, piano, and harmonium (1885)
- Op. 24, Suite dans le style ancien in D for trumpet, two flutes, and string quartet with Bass ad libitum (1886)
- Op. 25, Symphonie sur un chant montagnard français (Symphonie cévenole) for piano and orchestra (1886)
- Op. 26, Nocturne for piano (1886)
- Op. 27, Promenade for piano (1887)
- Op. 28, Sérénade et valse for orchestra (1885)
- Op. 29, Trio in B♭ for clarinet/violin, cello, and piano (1887)
- Op. 30, Schumanniana, three songs without words for piano (1887)
- Op. 31, Fantaisie sur des thèmes populaires français for oboe and orchestra (1888)
- Op. 32, Sur la mer, for female voices (1888)
- Op. 33, Tableaux de voyage, thirteen pieces for piano (1889)
- Op. 34, Karadec, incidental music for the drama by André Alexandre (1890)
- Op. 35, String Quartet No. 1 in D Minor (1890)
- Op. 36, Tableaux de voyage (orch. 1892 after piano works Op. 33/1. 2. 5. 4, 6, 13)
- Op. 37, Cantate de fête pour l'inauguration d'une statue for baritone, voices, and orchestra after E. Augier (1893)
- Op. 38, Prélude et petit canon à trois parties for organ (1893)
- Op. 39, L'art et le peuple, for four male voices after Hugo (1894), orch. (1918)
- Op. 40, Fervaal, action musicale with prologue and three acts (1889–93)
- Op. 41, Deus Israel conjungat vos, motet for four to six voices (1896)
- Op. 42, Istar, symphonic variations (1896)
- Op. 43, Lied maritime, song for voice and piano (1896)
- Op. 44, Ode à Valence, for soprano, male voices, and orchestra after Genest (1897)
- Op. 45, String Quartet No. 2 in E Major (1897)
- Op. 46, Les noces d'or du sacerdoce, canticle for voice and harmonium after P. Delaporte (1898)
- Op. 47, Médée, incidental music after C. Mendès (1898)
- Op. 48, La première dent, song for voice and piano after J. de La Laurencie (1898)
- Op. 49, Sancta Maria, succure miseris, motet for two equal voices and organ (1898)
- Op. 50, Chansons et danses for wind instruments (1898)
- Op. 51, Vêpres du commun des martyrs for organ (1899)
- Op. 52, Quatre-vingt-huit chansons populaires du Vivarais (1900)
- Op. 53, L'étranger, action musicale in two acts (1898–1901)
- Op. 54, Marche du 76ème régiment d'infanterie for military band (1903)
- Op. 55, Choral varié, for saxophone/viola and orchestra (1903)
- Op. 56, Mirage, song for voice and piano after P. Gravollet (1903)
- Op. 57, Symphony No. 2 in B♭ (1902-3)
- Op. 58, Les yeux de l'aimée, song for voice and piano (1904)
- Op. 59, Violin Sonata in C (1903-4)
- Op. 60, Petite chanson grégorienne for piano four hands (1904)
- Op. 61, Jour d'été à la montagne, symphonic triptych (1905)
- Op. 62, Souvenirs, poem for orchestra (1906)
- Op. 63, Piano Sonata in E (1907)
- Op. 64, Vocalise, song for voice and piano (1907)
- Op. 65, Menuet sur le nom de Haydn for piano (1909)
- Op. 66, Pièce in E♭ for harmonium (1911), pub. for organ (1912) and as Prélude (1913)
- Op. 67, La légende de Saint Christophe, drame sacré in three acts (1908–15), libretto by d'Indy after J. de Voragine's Legende aurea
- Op. 68, Treize pièces brèves for piano (1908–15)
- Op. 69, Douze pièces brèves faciles dans le style classique de la fin du XVIIIe siècle for piano (1908–15)
- Op. 70, Symphony No. 3 Sinfonia brevis de bello gallico (1916–18)
- Op. 71, Cent thèmes d'harmonie et réalisations (1907–18)
- Op. 72, Sarabande et menuet for wind quintet and piano (1918), arr. from Op. 24
- Op. 73, Sept chants de terroir for piano four hands (1918)
- Op. 74, Pour les enfants de tous les âges, twenty-four pieces for piano (1919)
- Op. 75, Pentecosten, twenty-four popular Gregorian canticles, for voice, union voices, and organ (1919)
- Op. 76, Veronica, incidental music after C. Gos (1919–20)
- Op. 77, Poèmes des rivages, symphonic suite (1919–21)
- Op. 78, Two Scholars' Songs for two voices after anon. (1921)
- Op. 79, Ave, regina coelorum, motet for four voices (1922)
- Op. 80, Le rêve de Cinyras, comédie musicale in three acts after X. de Courville (1922)
- Op. 81, Piano Quintet in G minor (1924)
- Op. 82, Trois chansons populaires françaises for four voices (1924)
- Op. 83, Deux motets en l'honneur de la canonisation de Saint Jean Eudes for four voices (1925)
- Op. 84, Cello Sonata in D (1924-5)
- Op. 85, Thème varié, fugue and chorale for piano (1925)
- Op. 86, Contes de fées, five pieces for piano (1925)
- Op. 87, Diptyque méditerranéen for orchestra (1925-6)
- Op. 88, O dominea mea, motet for two equal voices and organ (1926)
- Op. 89, Concert for piano, flute and cello with string orchestra (1926)
- Op. 90, Six chants populaires français (1927)
- Op. 91, Suite for flute, string trio, and harp (1927)
- Op. 92, Sextet in B♭ for two violins, two violas, and two cellos (1927)
- Op. 93, Le bouquet de printemps for three female voices after anon. (1928)
- Op. 94, Madrigal à deux voix, song for soprano and cello after Charles d'Orléans (1928)
- Op. 95, Six paraphrases sur des chansons enfantines de France (1928)
- Op. 96, String Quartet No. 3 in D♭ (1928-9)
- Op. 97, Les trois fileuses, for three equal voices after M. Chevais (1929)
- Op. 98, Piano Trio in G (1929)
- Op. 99, Fantaisie sur un vieil air de ronde française for piano (1930)
- Op. 100, Six chants populaires français for four voices (1930)
- Op. 101, Cinquante chansons populaires du Vivarais (1930)
- Op. 102, Chanson en forme de canon à l'octave for soprano and baritone (1931)
- Op. 103, Chant de nourrice for three equal voices after J. Aicard (1931)
- Op. 104, Le forgeron for three voices and string quartet after Aicard (1931)
- Op. 105, La vengeance du mari for soprano and two tenors, four voices, and small wind band/piano (1931), pub. as Op. 104

== Works without opus number ==
Orchestral

- Symphony No. 1 in A Symphonie italienne (1870–72)
- La divine comédie, symphonic poem after Dante (1871)

Chamber

- Scherzo in D for piano quartet (1871)
- Mosaïque sur Fervaal for military band (1897)
- Trois petites pièces (1907–15)
  - No. 1 in D for flute and piano
  - No. 2 in B♭ for clarinet and piano
  - No. 3 in F for horn and piano
- Rondino for four trumpets (1911)
- String Quartet No.4 (1931, incomplete)

Piano

- Quatre romances sans paroles (1870)

Secular vocal

- O gai soleil for two voices (1909)
- Vive Henry quatre for four voices and wind band/piano (1909), harmonization of song by anon.

Songs for voice and piano

- L'Académie Française nous a nommés tous trois, authorship of lyrics doubtful, possibly d'Indy (1888)
- Vingt-neuf chansons populaires du Vivarais et du Vercors (1892)
- Deux chansons enfantines (1896)
- Six chansons anciennes du Vivarais (1926)
- Ariette pour Tina (1927)
- Cinq chansons folkloriques et deux rigaudons à une voix (c. 1931)
