= A-sharp minor =

Minor scale based on A-sharp

- Relative key: C-sharp major
- Parallel key: A-sharp major →enharmonic: B-flat major
- Dominant key: E-sharp minor →enharmonic: F minor
- Subdominant key: D-sharp minor
- Enharmonic key: B-flat minor

Component pitches
- A♯, B♯, C♯, D♯, E♯, F♯, G♯

A-sharp minor is a minor musical scale based on A♯, consisting of the pitches A♯, B♯, C♯, D♯, E♯, F♯, and G♯. Its key signature has seven sharps.

Its relative major is C-sharp major. Its parallel major, A-sharp major, is usually rewritten as B-flat major, since A-sharp major's three double-sharps make it impractical to use. The enharmonic equivalent of A-sharp minor is B-flat minor, which only contains five flats and is often preferable to use.

The A-sharp natural minor scale is:

Changes needed for the melodic and harmonic versions of the scale are written in with accidentals as necessary. The A-sharp harmonic minor and melodic minor scales are:

In Christian Heinrich Rinck's 30 Preludes and Exercises in all major and minor keys, Op. 67, the 16th Prelude and Exercise and Max Reger's On the Theory of Modulation on pp. 46~50 are in A-sharp minor. In Bach's Prelude and Fugue in C-sharp major, BWV 848, a brief section near the beginning of the piece modulates to A-sharp minor.

In tuning systems where the number of notes per octave is not a multiple of 12, notes such as A♯ and B♭ are not enharmonically equivalent, nor are the corresponding key signatures. For example, the key of A-sharp minor, with seven sharps, is equivalent to B-flat minor in 12-tone equal temperament, but in 19-tone equal temperament, it is equivalent to B-double flat minor instead, with 12 flats. Therefore, A-sharp minor with 7 sharps, which has been rarely used in the existing 12-tone temperament, may be absolutely necessary.

== Scale degree chords ==
The scale degree chords of A-sharp minor are:

- Tonic – A-sharp minor
- Supertonic – B-sharp diminished
- Mediant – C-sharp major
- Subdominant – D-sharp minor
- Dominant – E-sharp minor
- Submediant – F-sharp major
- Subtonic – G-sharp major

No.	Flats		Sharps	
No.	Major	minor	Major	minor
0	C	a	C	a
1	F	d	G	e
2	B♭	g	D	b
3	E♭	c	A	f♯
4	A♭	f	E	c♯
5	D♭	b♭	B	g♯
6	G♭	e♭	F♯	d♯
7	C♭	a♭	C♯	a♯
8	F♭	d♭	G♯	e♯
