= Relative key =

Major and minor scales with same key signature

Circle of fifths showing major and minor keys

In music theory, relative keys are the major and minor scales that have the same key signatures (enharmonically equivalent), meaning that they share all of the same notes but are arranged in a different order of whole steps and half steps. A pair of major and minor scales sharing the same key signature are said to be in a relative relationship. The relative minor of a particular major key, or the relative major of a minor key, is the key which has the same key signature but a different tonic. (This is as opposed to parallel minor or major, which shares the same tonic.)

For example, F major and D minor both have one flat in their key signature: B♭. Therefore, D minor is the relative minor of F major, and conversely F major is the relative major of D minor. The tonic of the relative minor is the sixth scale degree of the major scale, while the tonic of the relative major is the third scale degree of the minor scale. The minor key starts three semitones below its relative major; for example, A minor is three semitones below its relative, C major.

The relative relationship may be visualized through the circle of fifths.

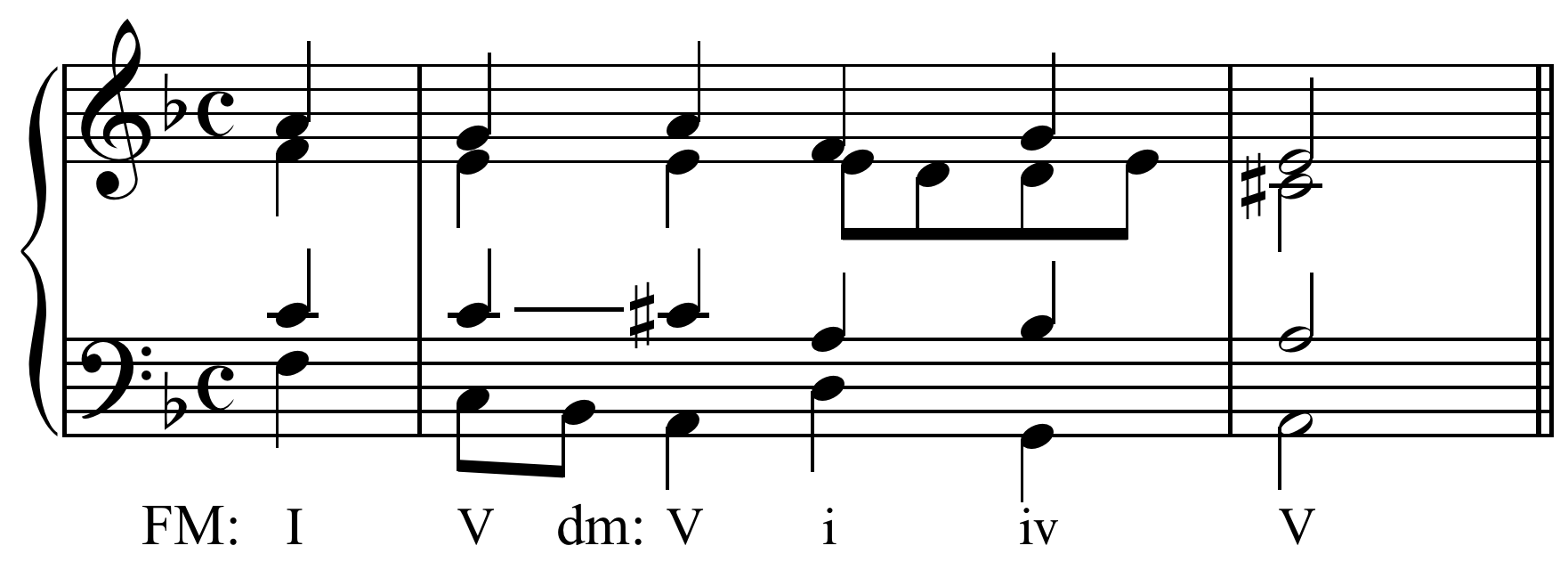
Chromatic modulation in Bach's Du grosser Schmerzensmann, BWV 300, m. 5-6 ( with half cadence, with PAC) transitions from FM to its relative minor dm through the inflection of C♮ to C♯ between the second and third chords. This modulation does not require a change of key signature.

Relative keys are a type of closely related keys, the keys between which most modulations occur, because they differ by no more than one accidental. Relative keys are the most closely related, as they share exactly the same notes.

The major key and the minor key also share the same set of chords. In every major key, the triad built on the first degree of the scale is major, the second and third are minor, the fourth and fifth are major, the sixth is minor, and the seventh is diminished. In the relative minor, the same triads pertain. Because of this, it can occasionally be difficult to determine whether a particular piece of music is in a major key or its relative minor.

== Distinguishing on the basis of melody ==
To distinguish a minor key from its relative major, one can look to the first note/chord of the melody, which usually is the tonic or the dominant (fifth note); The last note/chord also tends to be the tonic. A "raised 7th" is also a strong indication of a minor scale (instead of a major scale): For example, C major and A minor both have no sharps or flats in their key signatures, but if the note G♯ (the seventh note in A minor raised by a semitone) occurs frequently in a melody, then this melody is likely in A harmonic minor, instead of C major.

== List ==
A complete list of relative minor/major pairs in order of the circle of fifths is:

Key signature	Major key	Minor key
B♭, E♭, A♭, D♭, G♭, C♭, F♭	C♭ major	A♭ minor
B♭, E♭, A♭, D♭, G♭, C♭	G♭ major	E♭ minor
B♭, E♭, A♭, D♭, G♭	D♭ major	B♭ minor
B♭, E♭, A♭, D♭	A♭ major	F minor
B♭, E♭, A♭	E♭ major	C minor
B♭, E♭	B♭ major	G minor
B♭	F major	D minor
None	C major	A minor
F♯	G major	E minor
F♯, C♯	D major	B minor
F♯, C♯, G♯	A major	F♯ minor
F♯, C♯, G♯, D♯	E major	C♯ minor
F♯, C♯, G♯, D♯, A♯	B major	G♯ minor
F♯, C♯, G♯, D♯, A♯, E♯	F♯ major	D♯ minor
F♯, C♯, G♯, D♯, A♯, E♯, B♯	C♯ major	A♯ minor

== Terminology ==
In German, relative key is Paralleltonart, while parallel key is Varianttonart. Similar terminology is used in most Germanic and Slavic languages, but not in Romance languages. Adding to the confusion, a parallel chord is derived from the relative key.

== See also ==
- Chromatic mediant
- Mode (music)
