= B-flat minor =

Minor scale based on B-flat

- Relative key: D-flat major
- Parallel key: B-flat major
- Dominant key: F minor
- Subdominant key: E-flat minor
- Enharmonic key: A-sharp minor

Component pitches
- B♭, C, D♭, E♭, F, G♭, A♭

B-flat minor is a minor scale based on B♭, consisting of the pitches B♭, C, D♭, E♭, F, G♭, and A♭. Its key signature has five flats. Its relative major is D-flat major and its parallel major is B-flat major. Its enharmonic equivalent, A-sharp minor, which would contain seven sharps, is not normally used.

The B-flat natural minor scale is:

Changes needed for the melodic and harmonic versions of the scale are written in with accidentals as necessary. The B-flat harmonic minor and melodic minor scales are:

== Scale degree chords ==
The scale degree chords of B-flat minor are:

- Tonic – B-flat minor
- Supertonic – C diminished
- Mediant – D-flat major
- Subdominant – E-flat minor
- Dominant – F minor
- Submediant – G-flat major
- Subtonic – A-flat major

== Characteristics ==
B-flat minor is traditionally a 'dark' key.

The old natural horn was barely capable of playing in B-flat minor: the only example found in 18th-century music is a modulation that occurs in the first minuet of Franz Krommer's Concertino in D major, Op. 80.

== Notable classical compositions ==
- Charles-Valentin Alkan
  - Prelude Op. 31, No. 12 (Le temps qui n'est plus)
  - Symphony for Solo Piano, 3rd movement: Menuet
- Samuel Barber
  - Adagio for Strings
- Frédéric Chopin
  - Piano Sonata No. 2 "Funeral March"
  - Nocturne Op. 9 No. 1
  - Scherzo No. 2
  - Prelude Op. 28, No. 16 "Hades"
  - Mazurka Op. 24, No. 4
- Franz Liszt
  - Transcendental Étude No. 12 (Chasse-neige) from Transcendental Études
- Sergei Rachmaninoff
  - Piano Sonata No. 2, Op. 36
- Domenico Scarlatti
  - Keyboard Sonata in B-flat minor, K. 128
  - Keyboard Sonata in B-flat minor, K. 131
- Dmitri Shostakovich
  - Symphony No. 13, Op. 113 ("Babi Yar")
  - String Quartet No. 13, Op. 138
- Richard Strauss
  - An Alpine Symphony begins and ends in B-flat minor.
- Pyotr Ilyich Tchaikovsky
  - Piano Concerto No. 1
  - Marche slave
- William Walton
  - Symphony No. 1

No.	Flats		Sharps	
No.	Major	minor	Major	minor
0	C	a	C	a
1	F	d	G	e
2	B♭	g	D	b
3	E♭	c	A	f♯
4	A♭	f	E	c♯
5	D♭	b♭	B	g♯
6	G♭	e♭	F♯	d♯
7	C♭	a♭	C♯	a♯
8	F♭	d♭	G♯	e♯
