= F-sharp major =

Major scale based on F-sharp

- Relative key: D-sharp minor
- Parallel key: F-sharp minor
- Dominant key: C-sharp major
- Subdominant key: B major
- Enharmonic key: G-flat major

Component pitches
- F♯, G♯, A♯, B, C♯, D♯, E♯

F-sharp major is a major scale based on F♯, consisting of the pitches F♯, G♯, A♯, B, C♯, D♯, and E♯. Its key signature has six sharps. Its relative minor is D-sharp minor and its parallel minor is F-sharp minor. Its direct enharmonic, G-flat major, contains the same number of flats in its key signature as the number of sharps in F-sharp major.

The natural F-sharp major scale is:

Changes needed for the melodic and harmonic versions of the scale are written in with accidentals as necessary. The F-sharp harmonic major and melodic major scales are:

== Scale degree chords ==
The scale degree chords of F-sharp major are:

- Tonic – F-sharp major
- Supertonic – G-sharp minor
- Mediant – A-sharp minor
- Subdominant – B major
- Dominant – C-sharp major
- Submediant – D-sharp minor
- Leading tone – E-sharp diminished

== Music in F-sharp major ==
F-sharp major is the key of the minuets in Haydn's "Farewell" Symphony and of the String Quartet No. 5 from his Op. 76, of Beethoven's Piano Sonata No. 24, Op. 78, Verdi's "Va, pensiero" from Nabucco, Mahler's unfinished Tenth Symphony, Korngold's Symphony Op. 40, and Scriabin's Fourth Piano Sonata. The key was the favorite tonality of Olivier Messiaen, who used it throughout his work to express his most exciting or transcendent moods, most notably in the Turangalîla-Symphonie and the piano cycle Vingt Regards sur l'enfant-Jésus.

Like G-flat major, F-sharp major is rarely used in orchestral music, other than in passing. It is more common in piano music. Some examples include a Nocturne and the Barcarolle by Chopin, the sonatas of Alexander Scriabin and several pieces from Grieg's Lyric Pieces. Shostakovich's String Quartet No. 14 is in this key.

Liszt was apparently fond of F-sharp major, having uplifting while meditative pieces like "Les jeux d'eaux à la villa d'este" from Années de Pèlerinage III, S.163 and "Bénediction de Dieu dans la Solitude" from the set Harmonies Poétiques et Religieuses S.173 in this key. The first polka in Smetana's "3 Polkas de Salon" is in F-sharp major, as is Polonaise No. 1 by Stanisław Moniuszko.

No.	Flats		Sharps	
No.	Major	minor	Major	minor
0	C	a	C	a
1	F	d	G	e
2	B♭	g	D	b
3	E♭	c	A	f♯
4	A♭	f	E	c♯
5	D♭	b♭	B	g♯
6	G♭	e♭	F♯	d♯
7	C♭	a♭	C♯	a♯
8	F♭	d♭	G♯	e♯
