= Sharp (music) =

Symbol indicating one semitone higher

♯o

Sharp
- In Unicode: U+266F ♯ MUSIC SHARP SIGN (&sharp;)

Different from
- Different from: U+0023 # NUMBER SIGN; U+2317 ⌗ VIEWDATA SQUARE; U+22D5 ⋕ EQUAL AND PARALLEL TO; U+4E95 井 CJK UNIFIED IDEOGRAPH-4E95

Related
- See also: U+266D ♭ MUSIC FLAT SIGN

In music, sharp – eqv. dièse (from French) or diesis (Greek: δίεσις) (Note: For the etymology of the words dièse, diesis, and δίεσις, see diesis.) – means higher in pitch. The sharp symbol, ♯, indicates that the note to which the symbol is applied is played one chromatic semitone higher. The opposite of sharp is flat, indicating a lowering of pitch. The symbol derives from a square form of the letter b.

== Examples ==
The sharp symbol is used in key signatures or as an accidental applied to a single note. Below is a staff with a key signature containing three sharps (A major or F♯ minor) and a sharp symbol placed on the note, indicating that it is an A♯ instead of an A♮.

In twelve-tone equal temperament tuning (the predominant system of tuning in Western music), raising a note's pitch by a semitone results in a note that is enharmonically equivalent to another named note. For example, E♯ and F would be equivalent. This is not the case in most non-standard tuning systems.

== Related symbols ==
A double sharp is indicated by the symbol and raises a note by two chromatic semitones (a whole tone in 12-tone equal temperament). Double sharps were sometimes written, or.

A half sharp or demisharp raises a note by approximately a quarter tone. A sharp-and-a-half, three-quarter-tone sharp or sesquisharp raises a note by three quarter tones.

A triple sharp ( or ♯) is extremely rare. It raises a note by three chromatic semitones (a whole tone plus a semitone in 12-tone equal temperament). The B below would be enharmonic with D natural.

While this system allows for higher multiples of sharps, triple sharps are the practical limit, and there are only a few examples in the literature. In other tuning systems, such as 53 equal temperament, quadruple sharps or beyond may be required. A quadruple sharp would be indicated by the symbol.

== Key signature ==
The standard order in which sharps occur in a key signature is "F♯ C♯ G♯ D♯ A♯ E♯ B♯", with a maximum of 7.

In a key signature, sharps or flats are placed to the right of the clef. The pitches indicated apply in every measure and octave.

Number of sharps	Major key	Sharp notes	Minor key
0	C major	–	A minor
1	G major	F♯	E minor
2	D major	F♯, C♯	B minor
3	A major	F♯, C♯, G♯	F♯ minor
4	E major	F♯, C♯, G♯, D♯	C♯ minor
5	B major	F♯, C♯, G♯, D♯, A♯	G♯ minor
6	F♯ major	F♯, C♯, G♯, D♯, A♯, E♯	D♯ minor
7	C♯ major	F♯, C♯, G♯, D♯, A♯, E♯, B♯	A♯ minor

The order of sharps in key signatures is F♯, C♯, G♯, D♯, A♯, E♯, B♯. Starting with no sharps or flats (C major), adding the first sharp (F♯) indicates G major, adding the next (C♯) indicates D major, and so on through the circle of fifths.

Some keys may be written as an enharmonically equivalent key. In the standard tuning system of 12-tone equal temperament, the key of C♯ major, with seven sharps, may be written as D♭ major, with five flats. In rare cases the sharp keys may be extended further, into key signatures requiring a double sharp (for example, G♯ major, which requires an F double-sharp).

== Accidental ==
When used as an accidental, the sharp sign applies to the note on which it is placed, and to subsequent similar notes in the same measure and octave. In modern notation accidentals do not apply to notes in other octaves, but this was not always the convention.

As with all accidentals, a sharp can be cancelled on a subsequent similar note in the same measure by using a flat (♭) or a natural(♮).

== Unicode ==
In Unicode, assigned sharp signs are as follows:

- U+266F ♯ MUSIC SHARP SIGN (&sharp;)
- U+1D12A 𝄪 MUSICAL SYMBOL DOUBLE SHARP
- U+1D130 𝄰 MUSICAL SYMBOL SHARP UP
- U+1D131 𝄱 MUSICAL SYMBOL SHARP DOWN
- U+1D132 𝄲 MUSICAL SYMBOL QUARTER TONE SHARP

== Other notation and usage ==
- The sharp symbol (♯) resembles the number (hash) sign (#), with two intersecting sets of parallel double lines. While the number sign may have a pair of horizontal lines, the sharp sign has a pair of slanted lines that rise from left to right to avoid obscuring the staff lines. The other set of parallel lines are vertical in the sharp sign, while the number sign (#) may have slanted lines instead. It is also etymologically independent from the number sign. Likewise, while the double-sharp sign resembles a lower-case letter "x", it needs to be typographically distinct.
- Historically, lowering a double sharp to a single sharp could be notated using a natural sign and sharp sign (♮♯) or vice-versa (♯♮), but modern notation often uses the sharp sign alone. The same principle applies when canceling a triple sharp or beyond. The combination ♮♯ can be also written when changing a flat to a sharp.

- In environments where the symbol is not supported a double sharp can be written using two single sharp signs (♯♯), hash signs (##) or a lower-case letter x. Likewise, a triple sharp can be written as ♯♯♯.
- To allow extended just intonation, composer Ben Johnston uses a sharp to indicate a note is raised 70.6 cents (ratio 25:24).

== See also ==
- Electronic tuner
