= Enharmonic equivalence =

Distinct pitch classes sounding the same

In music, two written notes have enharmonic equivalence if they produce the same pitch but are notated differently. Similarly, written intervals, chords, or key signatures are considered enharmonic if they represent identical pitches that are notated differently. The term derives from Latin enharmonicus, in turn from Late Latin enarmonius, from Ancient Greek ἐναρμόνιος (enarmónios), from ἐν ('in') and ἁρμονία ('harmony').

== Definition ==
The notes F♯ and G♭ are enharmonic equivalents in 12 tet.
G and B are enharmonic equivalents; both are the same as A♮ in 12 tet.

The predominant tuning system in Western music is twelve-tone equal temperament (12 tet), where each octave is divided into twelve equal half-steps, or semitones; each half-step is both a chromatic semitone (a sharp or a flat) and a diatonic semitone (a minor step between two diatonic notes). The notes F and G are a whole step apart, so the note one semitone above F (F♯) and the note one semitone below G (G♭) indicate the same pitch. These written notes are enharmonic, or enharmonically equivalent. The choice of notation for a pitch can depend on its role in harmony; this notation keeps modern music compatible with earlier tuning systems, such as meantone temperaments. The choice can also depend on the note's readability in the context of the surrounding pitches. Multiple sharps or flats can produce other enharmonic equivalents; for example, F (double-sharp) is enharmonically equivalent to G♮.

When other tuning systems were in use, prior to the adoption of 12 tet, the term enharmonic referred to notes that were very close in pitch — closer than the smallest step of a diatonic scale — but not quite identical. In a tuning system without equal half steps, F♯ and G♭ do not indicate the same pitch, although the two pitches would be called enharmonically equivalent.

Enharmonic tritones: 12 tet aug 4th = dim 5th on C.

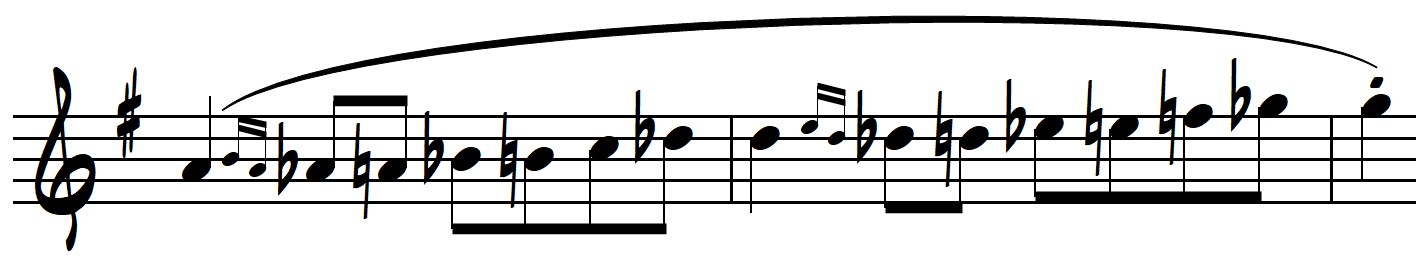
A musical passage notated as flats.

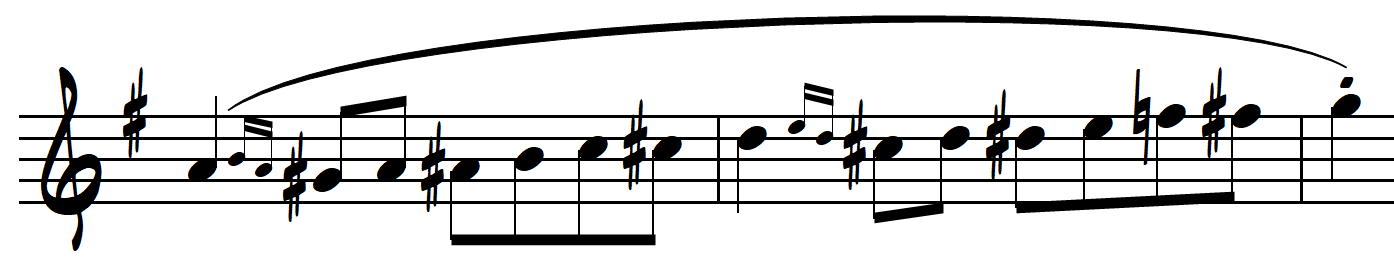
The same passage notated as sharps, requiring fewer canceling natural signs.

Sets of notes that involve pitch relationships — scales, key signatures, or intervals, for example — can also be referred to as enharmonic (e.g., in 12 tet the keys of C♯ major and D♭ major contain identical pitches and are therefore enharmonic). Identical intervals notated with different, enharmonically equivalent, written pitches are also referred to as enharmonic. The interval of a tritone above C may be written as a diminished fifth from C to G♭, or as an augmented fourth (C to F♯). In modern 12 tet, notating the C as a B♯ leads to other enharmonically equivalent notations, an option which does not exist in most earlier notation systems.

Enharmonic equivalents can be used to improve the readability of music, as when a sequence of notes is more easily read using sharps or flats. This may also reduce the number of accidentals required.

== Examples ==
At the end of the bridge section of Jerome Kern's "All the Things You Are", a G♯ (the sharp 5th of an augmented C chord) becomes an enharmonically equivalent A♭ (the third of an F minor chord) at the beginning of the returning A section.

Beethoven's Piano Sonata in E Minor, Op. 90, contains a passage where a B♭ becomes an A♯, altering its overt musical function. The first two bars of the following passage contain a descending B♭ major scale. Immediately following this, the B♭s become A♯s, the leading tone of B minor:

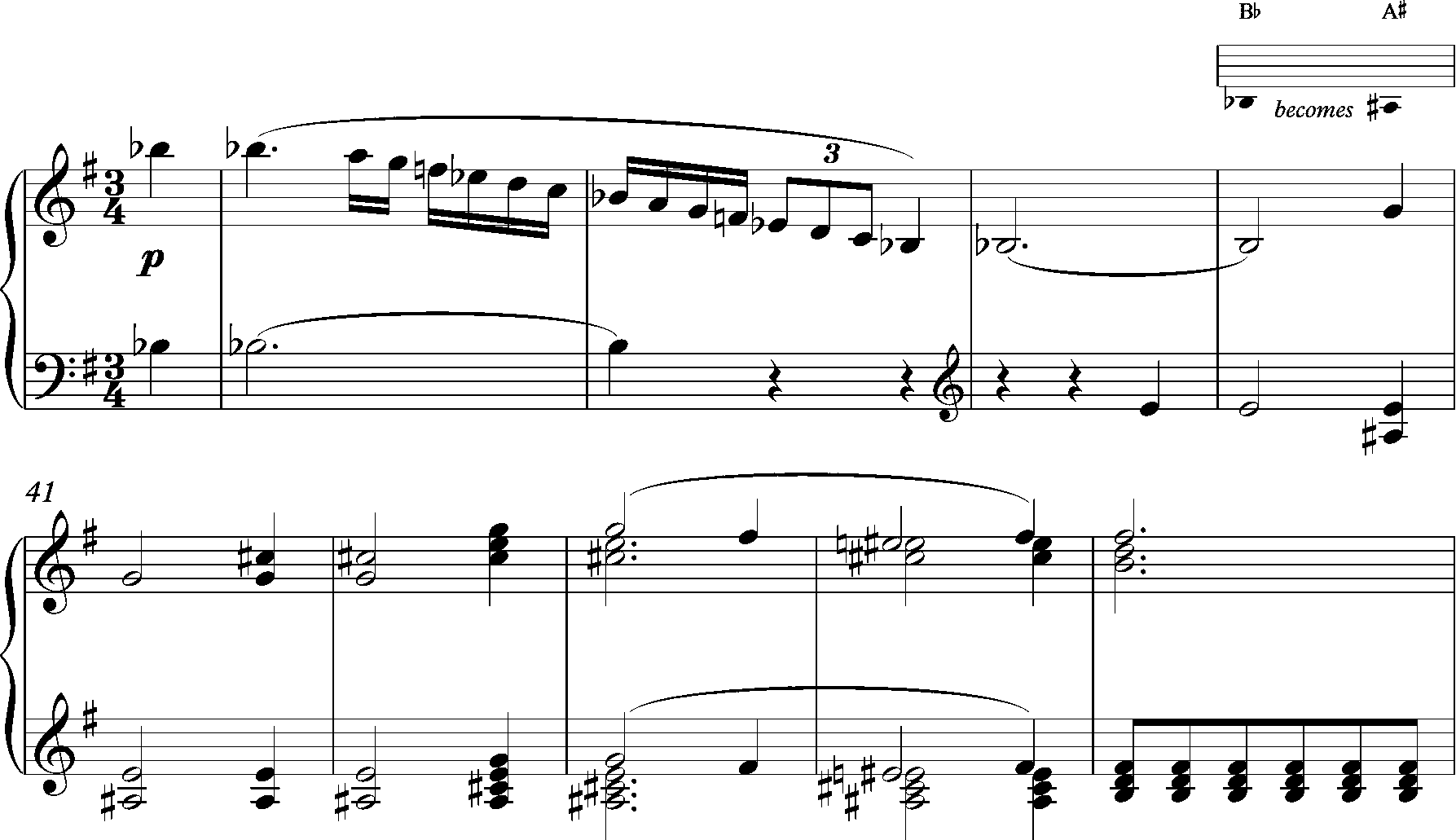
Beethoven Sonata in E Minor Op. 90, first movement, bars 37–45

Chopin's Prelude No. 15, known as the "Raindrop Prelude", features a pedal point on the note A♭ throughout its opening section.

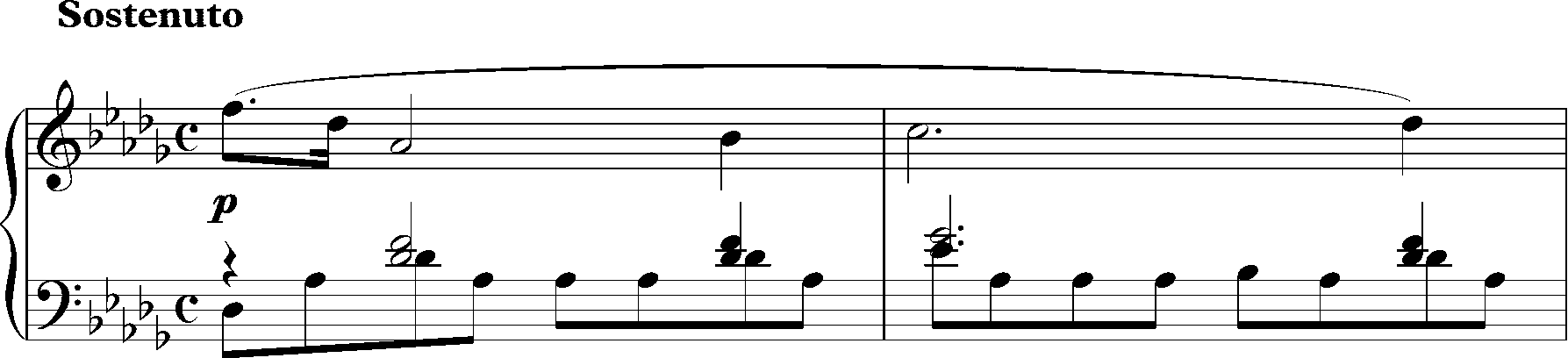
Chopin Prelude No. 15, opening

In the middle section, these are changed to G♯s as the key changes to C♯ minor. The new key is not notated as D♭ minor because that key signature would require a double-flat:

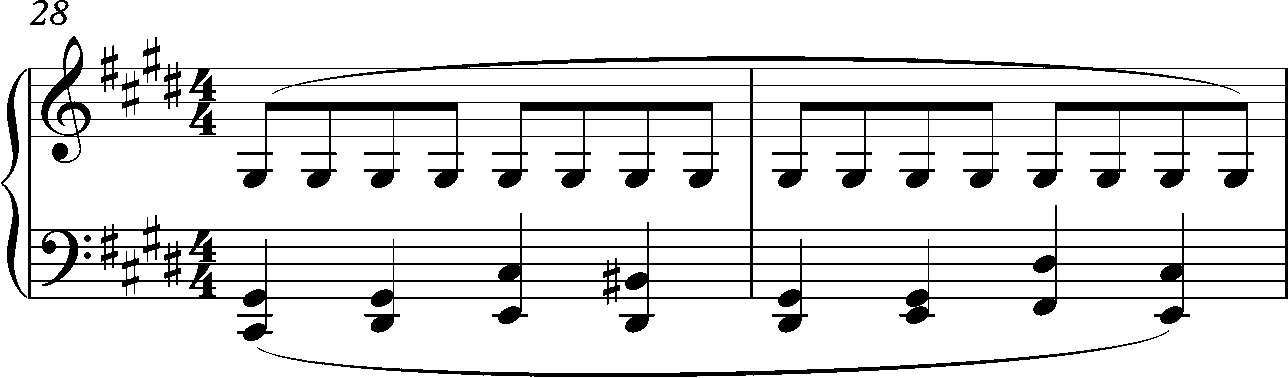
Chopin Prelude No. 15, bar 28–29

The concluding passage of the slow movement of Schubert's final piano sonata in B♭ (D960) contains an enharmonic change in bars 102–103, where there is a B♯ that functions as the third of a G♯ major triad. When the prevailing harmony changes to C major that pitch is notated as C♮:

G♯ to C♮ progression.

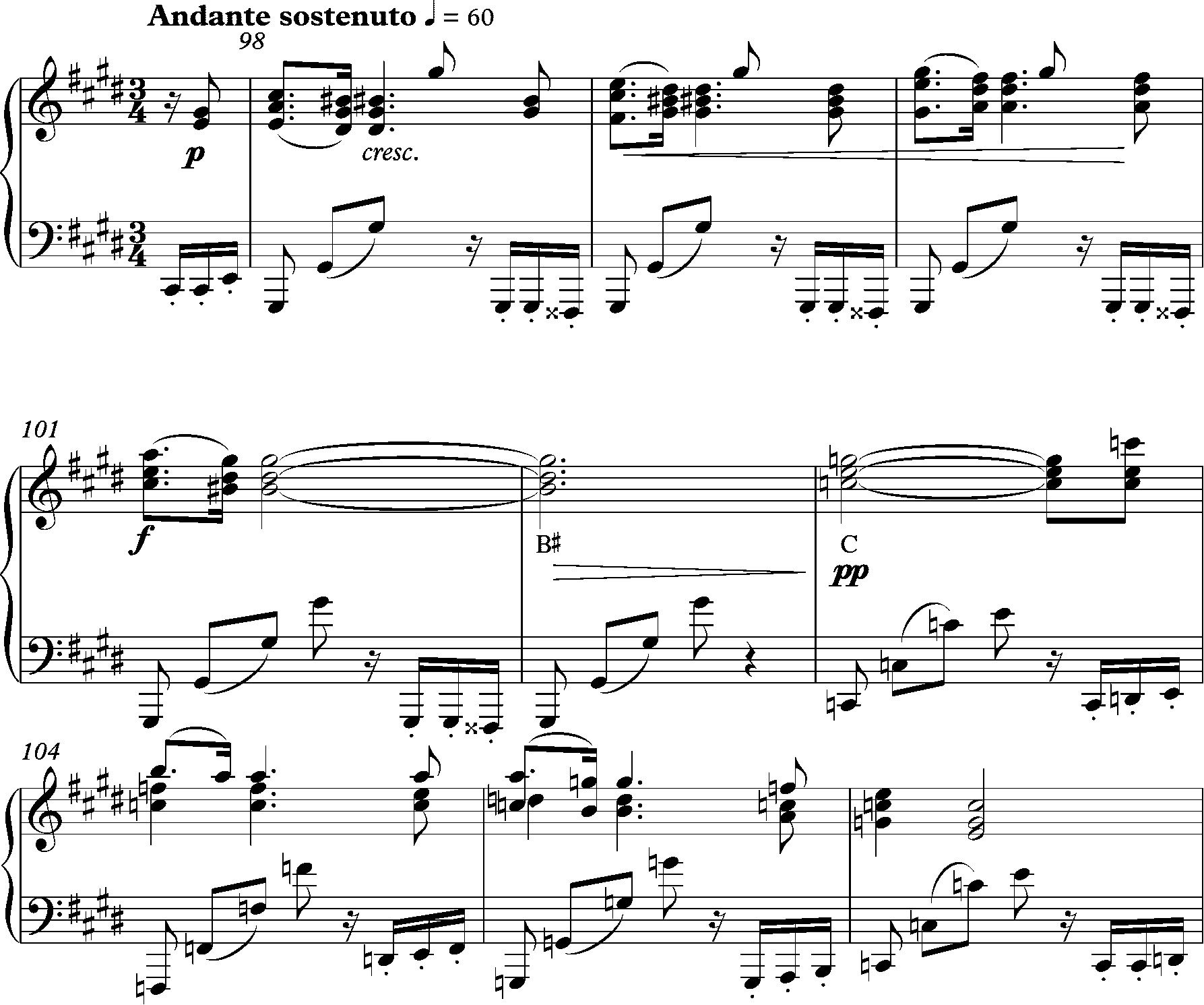
Schubert Piano Sonata, D960, second movement, bars 98–106

== Other tuning conventions ==
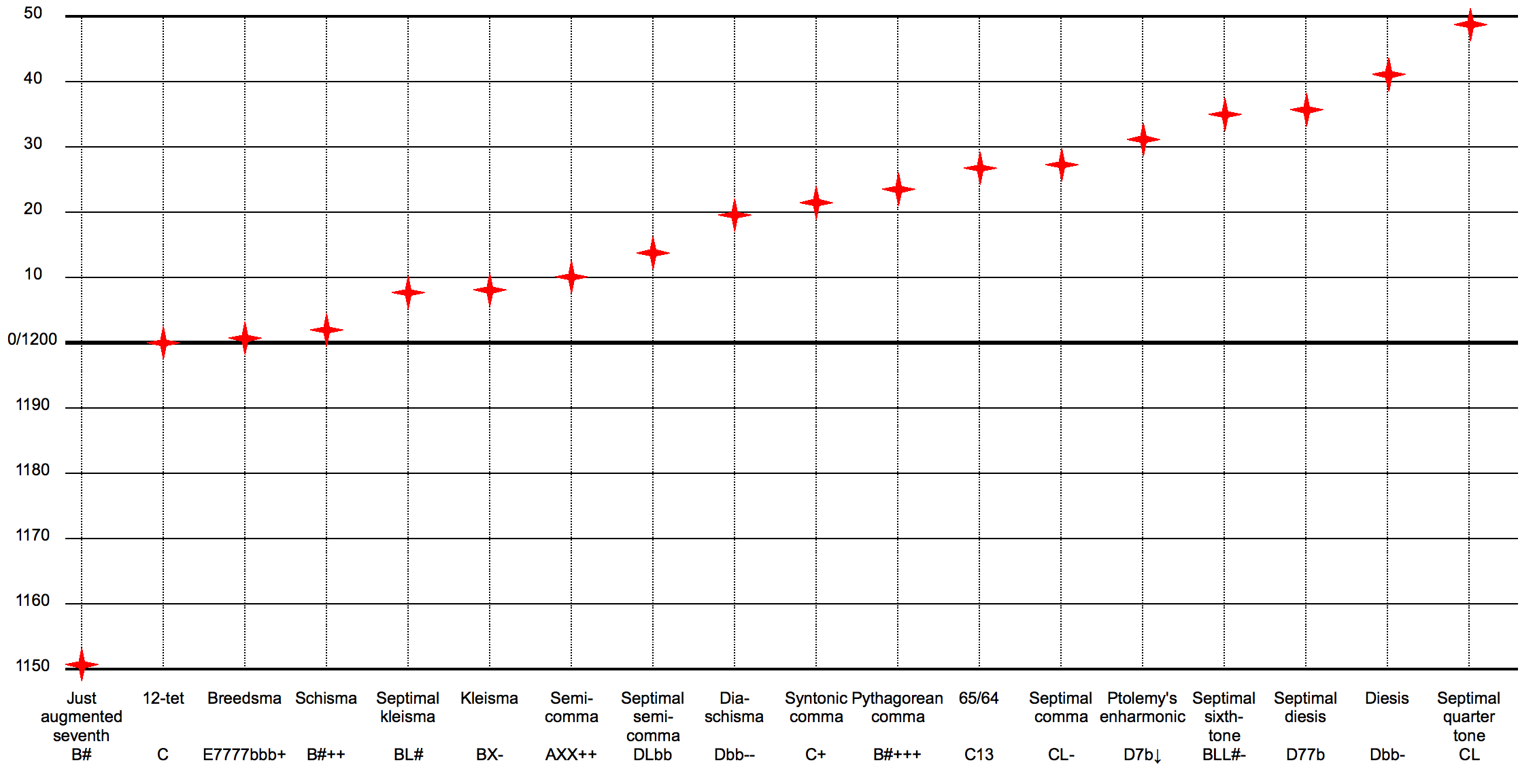
Comparison of intervals near or enharmonic with the unison

In twelve-tone equal temperament tuning, the standard tuning system of Western music, an octave is divided into 12 equal semitones. Written notes that produce the same pitch, such as C♯ and D♭, are called enharmonic. In other tuning systems, such pairs of written notes do not produce an identical pitch, but can still be called "enharmonic" using the older sense of the word.

=== Pythagorean ===
In Pythagorean tuning, all pitches are generated from a series of justly tuned perfect fifths, each with a frequency ratio of 3 to 2. If the first note in the series is an A♭, the thirteenth note in the series, G♯ is higher than the seventh octave (1 octave = frequency ratio of 2 to 1 = 2 ; 7 octaves is 2^{7} to 1 = 128 ) of the A♭ by a small interval called a Pythagorean comma. This interval is expressed mathematically as:

$$\frac{\ \hbox{twelve fifths}\ }{\ \hbox{seven octaves}\ }
~=~ \frac{ 1 }{\ 2^7}\left(\frac{ 3 }{\ 2\ }\right)^{12}
~=~ \frac{\ 3^{12} }{\ 2^{19} }
~=~ \frac{\ 531\ 441\ }{\ 524\ 288\ }
~=~ 1.013\ 643\ 264\ \ldots
~\approx~ 23.460\ 010 \hbox{ cents}
~.$$

=== Meantone ===
In quarter-comma meantone, there will be a discrepancy between, for example, G♯ and A♭. If middle C's frequency is f, the next highest C has a frequency of 2 f . The quarter-comma meantone has perfectly tuned ("just") major thirds, which means major thirds with a frequency ratio of exactly 5 / 4 . To form a just major third with the C above it, A♭ and the C above it must be in the ratio 5 to 4, so A♭ needs to have the frequency

$$\frac{\ 4\ }{ 5 }\ (2 f) = \frac{\ 8\ }{ 5 }\ f = 1.6\ f ~~.$$

To form a just major third above E, however, G♯ needs to form the ratio 5 to 4 with E, which, in turn, needs to form the ratio 5 to 4 with C, making the frequency of G♯

$$\left( \frac{\ 5\ }{ 4 } \right)^2\ f ~=~ \frac{\ 25\ }{ 16 }\ f ~=~ 1.5625\ f ~.$$

This leads to G♯ and A♭ being different pitches; G♯ is, in fact 41 cents (41% of a semitone) lower in pitch. The difference is the interval called the enharmonic diesis, or a frequency ratio of 128 / 125 . On a piano tuned in equal temperament, both G♯ and A♭ are played by striking the same key, so both have a frequency

$$\ 2^{\left(\ 8\ /\ 12\ \right)}\ f ~=~ 2^{\left(\ 2\ /\ 3\ \right)}\ f ~\approx~ 1.5874\ f ~.$$

Such small differences in pitch can skip notice when presented as melodic intervals; however, when they are sounded as chords, especially as long-duration chords, the difference between meantone intonation and equal-tempered intonation can be quite noticeable.

Enharmonically equivalent pitches can be referred to with a single name in many situations, such as the numbers of integer notation used in serialism and musical set theory and as employed by MIDI.

== Enharmonic genus ==
In ancient Greek music the enharmonic was one of the three Greek genera in music; in the enharmonic genus, the tetrachords are divided (in descending pitch order) as a ditone (^{m}3) plus two microtones. The ditone can be anywhere from 16/ 13 (359.5 cents) to 9/ 7 (435.1 cents) (3.55 to 4.35 semitones) and the microtones can be anything smaller than 1 semitone. Some examples of enharmonic genera in modern ascending pitch order are

Tonic	Lower µ‑tone	Highe µ‑tone	Ditone
1/ 1	36/ 35	16/ 15	4/ 3
1/ 1	28/ 27	16/ 15	4/ 3
1/ 1	64/ 63	28/ 27	4/ 3
1/ 1	49/ 48	28/ 27	4/ 3
1/ 1	25/ 24	13/ 12	4/ 3

== Enharmonic key ==
Some key signatures have an enharmonic equivalent that contains the same pitches, albeit spelled differently. In twelve-tone equal temperament, there are three pairs each of major and minor enharmonically equivalent keys: B major/C♭ major, G♯ minor/A♭ minor, F♯ major/G♭ major, D♯ minor/E♭ minor, C♯ major/D♭ major and A♯ minor/B♭ minor.

If a key were to use more than 7 sharps or flats it would require at least one double flat or double sharp. These key signatures are extremely rare since they have enharmonically equivalent keys with simpler, conventional key signatures. For example, G♯ major would require eight sharps (six sharps plus F double-sharp), but would almost always be replaced by the enharmonically equivalent key signature of A♭ major, with four flats.

== See also ==
- Enharmonic keyboard
- Music theory
- Transpositional equivalence
- Diatonic and chromatic
- Enharmonic modulation
