= Harmonic major scale =

Musical scale

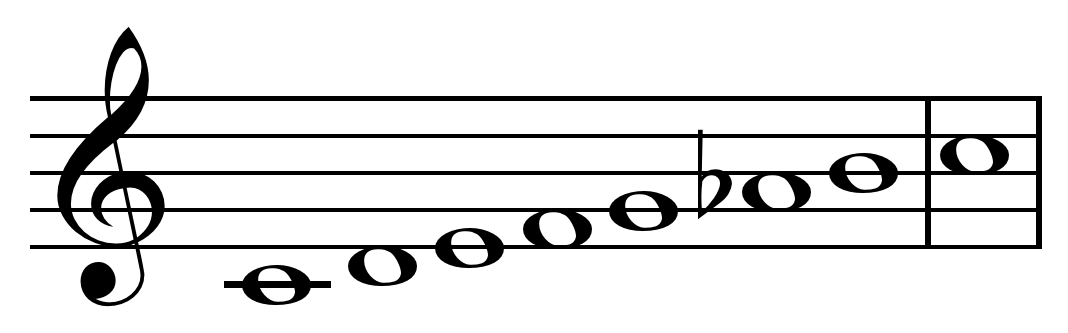
Harmonic major scale on C

The harmonic major scale is major scale with a lowered sixth. Its upper tetrachord is the same as that of the harmonic minor scale.

Harmonic major scales are commonly used in jazz and have corollaries in Indian ragas.

== Background ==
Nikolai Rimsky-Korsakov considered four scales to be the "basis of harmony": the natural minor and major, and the harmonic minor and major. The harmonic major scale is a major scale with the a lowered sixth degree. American musicologist Richard Taruskin polled his colleagues about the scale and found most of them had never heard of it. At least one of Rimsky-Korsakov's peers thought he invented the scale. Anatoly Lyadov helped Rimsky-Korsakov formulate his harmonic pedagogy, and Lyadov's method was derived from his teacher Yuliy Ivanovich Iogansen.

The scale is commonly found in Claude Debussy's music. Toru Takemitsu used the harmonic major scale in compositions like Coral Island and Rain Tree Sketch II. The latter was dedicated to Olivier Messiaen, whose analysis of scales was a major influence. Takemitsu's concept of the scale might have been derived from George Russell's ideas about scales where the harmonic major scale was configured as a "Lydian diminished scale".

In Hindustani and Carnatic music, the harmonic major scale respectively corresponds to the Raag Nat Bhairav and Raga Sarasangi.

== Construction ==
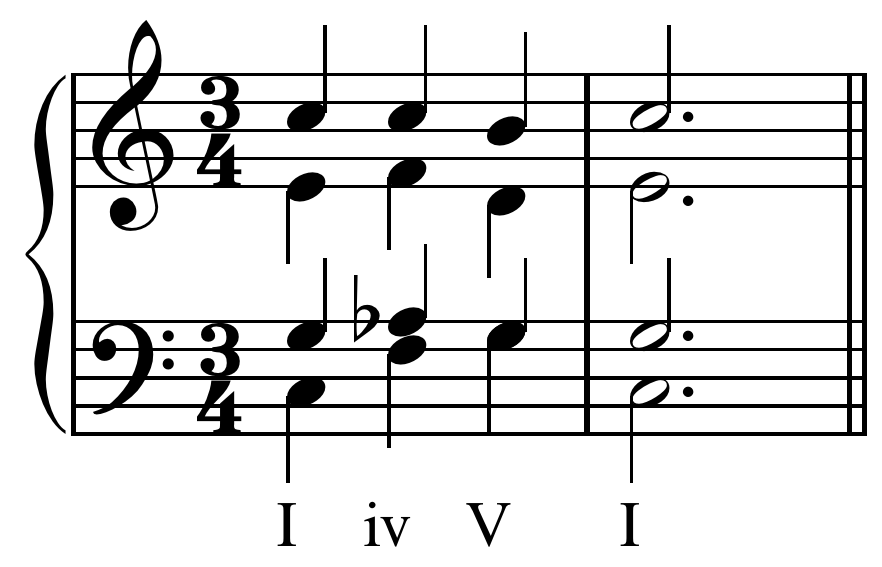
A progression in harmonic major.

The scale is simply a major scale with a lowered sixth. It is also the harmonic minor scale with a raised third. The chief value of this synthetic scale are the voice leading possibilities it generates. Jazz soloists often rely on its various modes.

The lowered sixth provides entry to progressions that are not governed by the circle of fifths. Composers can use it to create more symmetrical harmonies. In addition to the scale's minor subdominant chord, the triad built on the sixth scale degree is an augmented chord.

== Modes of harmonic major scale ==
Like Ionian (or major) scale, harmonic major scale has seven modes.

Mode	Name of scale	Degrees								Notes (on A)								Triad chords	Seventh chords
1	Harmonic major (or Ionian ♭6)	1	2	3	4	5	♭6	7	8	A	B	C♯	D	E	F	G♯	A	A	A^{maj7} (9, 11, ♭13)
2	Dorian ♭5 (or Locrian ♮2 ♮6)	1	2	♭3	4	♭5	6	♭7	8	A	B	C	D	E♭	F♯	G	A	A^{ο} or Am^{♭5}	A^{ø7} (9, 11, 13)
3	Phrygian ♭4 (or Altered Dominant/Superlocrian ♮5)	1	♭2	♭3	♭4	5	♭6	♭7	8	A	B♭	C	D♭	E	F	G	A	Am	A^{m7} (♭9, ♭11, ♭13)
4	Lydian ♭3 (or Jazz minor ♯4)	1	2	♭3	♯4	5	6	7	8	A	B	C	D♯	E	F♯	G♯	A	Am	Am^{maj7} (9, ♯11, 13)
5	Mixolydian ♭2	1	♭2	3	4	5	6	♭7	8	A	B♭	C♯	D	E	F♯	G	A	A	A^{7} (♭9, 11, 13)
6	Lydian ♯2 ♯5	1	♯2	3	♯4	♯5	6	7	8	A	B♯	C♯	D♯	E♯	F♯	G♯	A	A+	A+^{maj7} (♯9, ♯11, 13)
7	Locrian 7	1	♭2	♭3	4	♭5	♭6	7	8	A	B♭	C	D	E♭	F	G♭	A	A^{ο} or Am^{♭5}	A^{ο7} (♭9, 11, ♭13)
