= Parallel key =

Major and minor scales with same tonic

Parallel tonic chords on C major (C), and C minor (Cm).

In music theory, a major scale and a minor scale that have the same starting note (tonic) are called parallel keys and are said to be in a parallel relationship. For example, G major and G minor have the same tonic (G) but have different modes, so G minor is the parallel minor of G major. This relationship is different from that of relative keys, a pair of major and minor scales that share the same notes but start on different tonics (e.g., G major and E minor).

Parallel major and minor scales on C: common notes connected by a vertical line.

A major scale can be transformed to its parallel minor by lowering the third, sixth, and seventh scale degrees, and a minor scale can be transformed to its parallel major by raising those same scale degrees.

In the early nineteenth century, composers began to experiment with freely borrowing chords from the parallel key.

In rock and popular music, examples of songs that emphasize parallel keys include Grass Roots' "Temptation Eyes", The Police's "Every Little Thing She Does Is Magic", Lipps Inc's "Funkytown", The Beatles' "Norwegian Wood," and Dusty Springfield's "You Don't Have To Say You Love Me".

== See also ==
- Harmonic parallelism
- List of major/minor compositions
- Picardy third
- Voice leading
