= Beg for It (song) =

Single by Iggy Azalea featuring MØ

from the album Reclassified
- Released: October 24, 2014
- Studio: Record Plant (Los Angeles); Sarm West Studios, Grove Studios (London); Downtown Music Studios (New York City)
- Genre: Trap; hip hop
- Length: 2:58
- Label: Def Jam; Virgin EMI
- Songwriters: Amethyst Kelly; Charlotte Aitchison; Jason Pebworth; George Astasio; Jon Shave; Kurtis McKenzie; Jon Turner
- Producers: The Invisible Men; The Arcade

Iggy Azalea singles chronology
"Booty" (2014)	"Beg for It" (2014)	"Trouble" (2015)

MØ singles chronology
"One More" (2014)	"Beg for It" (2014)	"Lean On" (2015)

Lyric video
- "Beg for It" on YouTube

"Beg for It" is a song by Australian rapper Iggy Azalea featuring Danish singer MØ. It was written by Azalea, Charli XCX, Jon Turner, the Invisible Men, and the Arcade, with production handled by the latter two. The song was released on 24 October 2014 as the lead single from the reissue of Azalea's debut studio album, The New Classic (2014), titled Reclassified (2014). An initial live preview of the song in September 2014 resulted in widespread media speculation that it featured Charli XCX as the sequel to "Fancy", Charli XCX's previous collaboration with Azalea. However, it was later revealed that Charli XCX wrote the track's hook for MØ, whom Azalea discovered on YouTube. A hip hop and trap song, "Beg for It" contains a percolating, booming stark beat and solicits a sinuous, minimalist feel. Its lyrical content comprises themes of girl power and prominently figures the phrase "pussy power".

The song garnered generally favourable reviews from music critics, many of whom commended its catchiness. Others were, however, ambivalent towards its similarities with Azalea's previous singles "Black Widow" and "Fancy". "Beg for It" became a top 30 hit on the U.S. Billboard Hot 100 and in Australia, where it peaked at number 27 and number 29 respectively. It was more successful on the U.S. Hot R&B/Hip-Hop Songs chart where it peaked at number eight for five consecutive weeks and became Azalea's fourth top 10 hit of 2014. It also peaked at number four in Germany and number nine in Flanders (Belgium). In May 2015, "Beg for It" was certified platinum by the Recording Industry Association of America (RIAA).

An accompanying music video for the song, directed by David LaChapelle, was cancelled due to scheduling conflicts and Azalea's conflicting tour schedule. Instead, an accompanying lyric video for the song was released on Azalea's Vevo page. Their first live performance of the song on Saturday Night Live was panned by many critics, who commented extensively on MØ's vocal latency and poor performance timing, with one deeming it "one of the most cringe-worthy live moments in recent history". MØ uploaded a handwritten apology in response to the criticism, in which she explained that she experienced technical difficulties with her microphone. The singer was absent from all of Azalea's subsequent live performances of "Beg for It" on The Tonight Show Starring Jimmy Fallon, the 41st People's Choice Awards and the 2014 American Music Awards.

== Background ==
"Beg for It" was written by Azalea, Charli XCX, the Invisible Men, the Arcade, and Jon Turner. The Invisible Men and the Arcade also produced the track, while Daniel Zaidenstadt and Paul Falcone did the recording. The song was recorded in four different studios; Record Plant in Los Angeles, Sarm West Studios and Grove Studios in London, and Downtown Music Studios in New York City. "Beg for It" was subsequently mixed by Anthony Kilhoffer with the assistance of Kyle Ross at The Mix Spot in Los Angeles, and then mastered by Miles Showell at Abbey Road Studios in London.

Azalea previewed "Beg for It" during her live show at the Shepherd's Bush Empire in London on 14 September 2014. The preview resulted in widespread media speculation that the song featured Charli XCX, and would serve as a sequel to "Fancy", Charli XCX's previous collaboration with Azalea. However, in Azalea's announcement of the song's single release on Twitter on 10 October 2014, it was revealed that Danish singer MØ was the track's featured vocalist instead. The rapper went on to post her view of MØ on the social media network, stating: "A lot of you may not know her, but she's super cool. I love her voice and her eyebrows". In an interview with Ryan Seacrest, Azalea said she wanted to assist a rising star with a guest feature on her album, and "fell in love" with MØ after discovering the singer on YouTube. Charli XCX later revealed on Twitter that she specifically wrote MØ's hook in the song.

== Release ==
"Beg for It" served as the lead single from the reissue of Azalea's debut studio album The New Classic, titled Reclassified (2014), and was preceded by the promotional single, "Iggy SZN". The single's cover art was revealed by Azalea on Instagram on 17 October 2014. The sketched cover depicts Azalea posing with a jacket draped over her shoulder, while accompanied by a white panther. John Walker of MTV News opined that the artwork was predominantly influenced by American artist Patrick Nagel and 1980s fashion. "Beg for It" was released as digital download "instant grat" in the United States at 00:00 EST (15:00 UTC) on 24 October 2014, with the pre-order of Reclassified on the iTunes Store. The song then received its radio premiere on iHeartRadio a few hours later, at 06:00 EST (11:00 UTC). WJHM subsequently played the song 16 times in its first day following its premiere. "Beg for It" impacted contemporary hit radio and rhythmic contemporary radio in the United States on 28 October 2014. The song's digital release was slated to 24 November 2014 in the United Kingdom, the same day as Reclassified. A digital remixes EP was later commissioned in Australia on 18 December 2014, and in the United Kingdom on 25 January 2015.

== Composition ==
"Beg for It"
An 18-second sample of "Beg for It", in which Azalea's cadence and braggadocio contrasts with MØ's playful, bubbly tone; over production consisting of impish, echoed synthesizers, hollowed-out bass, and drum and keyboard instrumentation.

"Beg for It" is a hip hop and trap song. It contains a percolating, booming stark beat, and solicits a sinuous, minimalist feel. The song's instrumentation comprises an impish, echoed synthesizer, hollowed-out bass, and drums and keyboards played by members of The Invisible Men and The Arcade. "Beg for It" is set in the time signature of common time, with a moderately fast tempo of 94 beats per minute. It is composed in the key of E flat minor with Azalea and MØ's vocals spanning the tonal nodes of E♭_{4} to D♭_{5}. A basic sequence of A# m–F#-C#-Gb is followed throughout the song as its chord progression.

The track opens with Azalea rapping the line, "Pull up looking picture perfect, baby / High price, but I'm worth it baby". MØ sings the chorus hook, "I know you like the way I turn it on / I'm out here with my friends / Imma make you beg, make you beg for it," with "swagger", and a playful and bubbly tone; in contrast with Azalea's cadence and braggadocio in its verses. It was noted that MØ's vocal was heavily processed, with a jocose sample bound along with it. "Beg for It" also features additional vocals by Charli XCX and background vocals by Antonia Karamani. The track garnered several comparisons with the rapper's two previous singles, "Black Widow" and "Fancy". It was also noted to share similarities with T.I.'s "No Mediocre", which features Azalea.

"Beg for It" contains themes of girl power, and prominently figures the phrase "pussy power". The lyric, "Iggy, Iggy, Iggy can't you see? / That everyone wants to put their hands on me" interpolates The Notorious B.I.G.'s "Hypnotize" (1997). Marissa G. Miller of Radio.com noted that Azalea's verse, "That everybody wanna put their hands on me / See I be on this money why your man on me / And I need another hand with all these bandz on me," depicted the rapper as "headstrong". Throughout the song, the Azalea's lyrics tease and gloat about an ex-lover who "wants to bring the feeling back". "Beg for It" also explores a common pop theme of telling a man to work hard for the protagonist's attention.

== Critical reception ==
"Beg for It" garnered generally favourable reviews from music critics. Jeff Benjamin of Fuse said Azalea "shines and sounds more confident than ever" and that the song was "perhaps even more addicting" than "Fancy". MTV News reporter Adam Fleischer said that the rapper "may have another smash on her hands". Jaclyn Hendricks of the New York Post suggested that "Beg for It" was Azalea's catchiest song to date. Complimenting the track's jocose sample, MØ's "distinct" vocal and Azalea's rapping, Amy Davidson of Digital Spy said the single was "doing nothing to disprove that Iggy is anything but at the top of her game right now". AllMusic's David Jeffries highlighted "Beg for It" as the second-best song on Reclassified, behind "Fancy". Complex writer David Drake described it as "a more immediate, pop-chart-ready record than anything she's made outside 'Fancy' itself". Rory Cashin of State commended MØ's "uniquely chilly sexy confidence" in "Beg for It". The track was also deemed "catchy" by Daniel Kreps of Rolling Stone. Consequence of Sound's Chris Coplan felt "Beg for It" demonstrated Azalea's versatility in her musical collaborations.

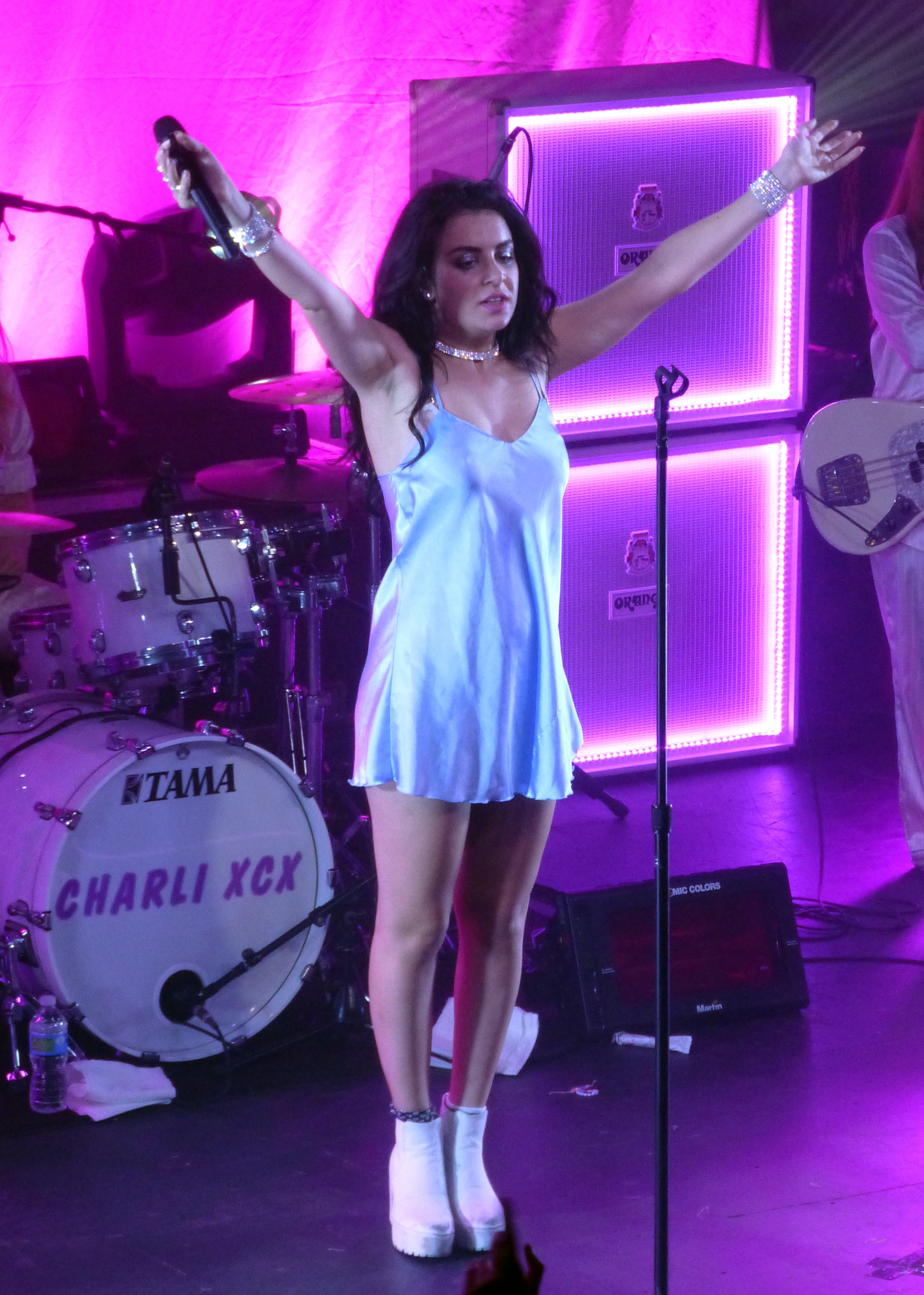
Charli XCX wrote the chorus of "Beg for It."

However, critics were ambivalent towards the song's similarities with "Fancy" and "Black Widow". Idolator's Mike Wass said the track comes close to resembling "Fancy", but noted that "the formula clearly still works". Wass also gave praise to Azalea's flow in her lyrics and predicted that with an accompanying music video, "Beg for It" would become the rapper's fourth top 10 hit on the Billboard Hot 100. Patrick Ryan of USA Today commended the track for containing the staples of "Fancy" and "Black Widow", and highlighted its "arresting" verses, "hypnotic" beat and "memorable" hook. Similarly, PopSugar's Nick Maslow complimented "Beg for It" for following the formula set by its two predecessors, Azalea's "memorable" verses and MØ's "earworm-worthy" hook.

James Grebey of Spin wrote: "The bulk of the song does sound quite a bit like a mashup of 'Fancy' and 'Black Widow,' a comparison that can, we guess, be taken as a compliment. Or, you know, not". In a mixed review, Billboard columnist Jason Lipshutz awarded "Beg for It" two-and-a-half out of five stars, criticising Azalea's use of half-baked similies and following the formula of "Fancy", but viewed the song as MØ's "best bid for U.S. stardom". Music Times writer Carolyn Menyes said that what made "Beg for It" most remarkable was the manifestation that its hook was written by "Fancy" collaborator Charli XCX, and dismissed its lyrics and rhymes. She felt Azalea showcased "impressive rapping prowess," but was meandering throughout the track. However, Menyes called MØ "the true standout" on the track and said that it would assist the singer with her breakthrough into mainstream success in the United States. Allan Raible of ABC News viewed the song as a "redo" of "Fancy" and felt Azalea lacked an "impressive flow". Raible concluded, "While this works, it is more of the same". In a negative review, Jim Farber of the Daily News called "Beg for It" a "rote recycle" of "Fancy", and commented, "It sounds like it was thrown together as quickly as possible, a nervous sop to her ravenous fan base". Sam Wolfson of The Guardian deemed it "a cheap rip-off" of "Fancy", adding, "the same schoolgirl chorus and flow g-g-g-gimmicks". Similarly, Maura Johnston of the same publication said that the track "can't hold a candle to 'Fancy,' pop-song wise".

== Commercial performance ==
In the United States, "Beg for It" debuted at number 92 on the Billboard Hot 100 issued for 8 November 2014. It sold 20,000 digital copies and garnered a 20 million radio audience in its first week. In its fifth week, it climbed from number 49 to number 35, in part attributed by a 12% increase in its digital sales of 48,000 copies that week. The song then rose to number 29 the following week, in part attributed by the 1.5 million streams it received for that week. It went on to peak at number 27 on 10 January 2015, becoming Azalea's sixth top forty hit and MØ's first chart entry and first Top 40 on the Billboard Hot 100, and remained on the chart for a total of 16 weeks. "Beg for It" bowed at number 26 on the Hot R&B/Hip-Hop Songs chart dated for 8 November 2014. In its fifth week, it rose from number 14 to number nine and was the chart's greatest airplay gainer for that week. The song also marked Azalea's fourth top 10 hit on Hot R&B/Hip-Hop Songs for 2014, and went on to peak at number eight for five consecutive weeks. "Beg for It" debuted at number 28 on the Rhythmic chart issued for 15 November 2014 as its greatest gainer for that week. It then climbed to number 17, becoming the chart's greatest gainer for a second successive week, and later peaked at number four on the chart dated for 3 January 2015. "Beg for It" was most successful on the Dance Club Songs chart, where it debuted at number 48 on the chart issued for 27 December 2014, and later peaked at number three for two consecutive weeks. As of January 2015, "Beg for It" had sold 604,380 copies in the United States. It was certified Platinum by the Recording Industry Association of America (RIAA) on 29 May 2015.

"Beg for It" peaked at number 29 on the Australian Singles Chart issued for 23 November 2014, marking Azalea's sixth top 40 hit in Australia. In Canada, the song debuted at number 88 on the Canadian Hot 100 dated for 7 December 2014, and went on to reach a peak of number 44. "Beg for It" was less successful in the United Kingdom, where it did not receive a radio release, peaking at number 111 on the UK Singles Chart issued for 6 December 2014. It also peaked at number 88 on the Scottish Singles Chart.

== Live performances ==
=== Saturday Night Live ===
Azalea performed "Beg for It" for the first time on live television in a rendition with MØ, during the rapper's appearance on Saturday Night Live on 25 October 2014. The performance started with Azalea dressed in all-black, seated on a black throne surrounded by two large black panther marble statues. Erin Whitney of The Huffington Post opined that the set had a "futuristic The Jungle Book meets Chicago vibe". Azalea went on to gyrate across the stage for the rest of the performance, while flanked by a bevy of male and female backing dancers. MØ took the stage midway through "Beg for It" to deliver the song's chorus. The performance became the subject of widespread media attention and controversy, and was unanimously panned by critics. Entertainment Tonight deemed it "one of the most cringe-worthy live moments in recent history," and highlighted that it was MØ's "nervous dancing and offbeat singing" that garnered the worst of the criticism. Jezebel's Julianne Escobedo Sheppard commented that Azalea fell victim to the "Saturday Night Live curse" with the performance which she felt "wasn't doing any favours" for the rapper's reputation. Katie Hasty of HitFix said that "Beg for It" was "hardly ready for primetime, or nighttime, or just about any time at all, particularly when it came to featured singer MØ". HitFix subsequently placed the performance in their list of "10 terrible SNL musical performances". The performance was also listed as one of the show's worst moments of 2014 by the Toronto Sun. Hilary Hughes of The Village Voice commented that MØ "stumbled upon her lines with the grace of a drunk person in a church" and felt the performance's execution was "abysmal". Hughes went on to question if the performance was the worst in Saturday Night Live history. Chris Payne of Billboard, and the New Zealand Herald called the rendition a "flub". Menyes dismissed it as a "disastrous performance," and said MØ "missed all her marks". The performance aided a four percent gain in Azalea's overall points on the Billboard Social 50, where she rose one position to number 13. According to Next Big Sound, the performance generated 170,000 new fans for the rapper across Twitter and Facebook, and resulted in a 73% rise in Azalea's weekly reactions on Instagram, where she posted scenes from the broadcast.

External image
- An image of the handwritten apology MØ posted on Instagram, the day after her performance of "Beg for It" with Azalea on Saturday Night Live.

MØ later addressed her performance's criticism with an image of a handwritten apology she posted on Instagram the following day. She explained that she had technical issues on her microphone, which resulted in latency in her vocal delivery and poor performance timing. The singer also stated, "It pains me and I'm so sad today. But life goes on...", adding, "It sucks to be an anti-hero". Azalea responded by resonating that she chose to collaborate with MØ because she was "amazing" and said that the singer's talent would be showcased to her critics in a performance of "Beg for It" at the 2014 American Music Awards. The rapper also told MØ to not let the criticism "knock her confidence," adding, "things go wrong along the way, its not against the rules". To which MØ replied: "that's so true.. My mom actually called me right this moment and said the exact same thing. Wise women". Despite Azalea's response and announcement of their American Music Awards performance, MØ was absent from all the rapper's subsequent live performances of "Beg for It". On 25 November 2014, MØ elaborated on her Saturday Night Live performance, saying,

It taught me two things, one of which I already knew: I already knew that technical problems happen and you'll never figure out why, but there's a problem and you dunno what to do… And maybe if I was more trained in doing that kind of thing I could have faked it, but I got confused from the moment I opened my mouth because I couldn't hear my timing so I was just lost. And I'm very bad at looking like I own it if I don't. I don't wanna be that perfect hero that does everything right because I'm not. I always fucking walk into a wall and stuff like that. I'm very clumsy and that's fine.

=== Other performances ===
At the 2014 American Music Awards on 23 November 2014, Azalea performed the track in a medley with "Fancy" while dancing affront a futuristic jungle gym that was being climbed by several of her backing singers and dancers. At one point during the rendition, Azalea's audio dropped out, to which ABC News Radio suggested was a result of censoring profanity. Joe Lynch of Billboard cited it as a microphone problem on Azalea's part in his review of the rendition which he described as "great showmanship, so-so execution," adding, "maybe the song is cursed?" In an article entitled, "Iggy Azalea's 'Beg For It' AMAs Performance: Where Was MØ?", Lipshutz wrote that MØ's absence "wasn't groundbreaking news" and that a rep for the singer did not immediately respond to request for comments. Rolling Stone said the performance evoked the music videos of Paula Abdul's "Cold Hearted" and Janet Jackson's "Rhythm Nation" (1989). Dressed in pink trousers and a printed blazer, Azalea reprised "Beg for It" in a rendition with The Roots on The Tonight Show Starring Jimmy Fallon on 26 November 2014. Rap-Up said Azalea "worked the stage" during the rendition. Josiah Hughes of Exclaim! viewed it as an "explosive performance" and said, "Though there was plenty going on onstage, it was the rapper who commanded the most attention". XXL called it "a performance full of attitude". Music Times writer Shawn Christ said The Roots elevated the rapper's rendition to "new heights," and deemed it "a pretty steamy performance, at least for NBC's standards".

On 8 January 2015, Azalea performed the track as the closing performance of the 41st People's Choice Awards. The rendition featured vibrant stage colouring and choreography. Azalea sported a 1960s mod hairdo and a white bodysuit, while her surrounding dancers were similarly dressed in all-white outfits. De Stijl, Mondrian-stimulated squares served as the rapper's backdrop throughout. Despite Azalea's wardrobe malfunction during the performance which was later deemed "embarrassing" by Nadine DeNinno of OK!, the rendition was well received by critics and the show's audience. Katie Atkinson of Billboard wrote that Azalea "looked every bit the champion" and "stood out from the pack," during the performance which she felt was "confident," and "a whole new take" in comparison with previous renditions of "Beg for It". Rap-Up deemed the performance "white-hot," while George Palathingal of the Sydney Morning Herald described it as "slick". Brian Josephs of The Boombox said the crowd responded well to the performance. Similarly, Josh Sorokach of People's Choice said Azalea's rendition "delighted" the show's audience, and was "crowd-pleasing" and "memorable". The performance also garnered a positive reception from Ellen DeGeneres and Kaley Cuoco.

== Music video ==
On 20 October 2014, Azalea announced on Twitter that David LaChapelle would be directing the music video for "Beg for It", and wrote, "I'm so excited I've looked to him as an inspiration for so long, def worth the wait". The music video's release was later dubbed an elephant in the room scenario by the media and Azalea's fans. On 23 December 2014, Azalea announced on Twitter that the clip had been scrapped due to poor timing and her conflicting KIIS-FM Jingle Ball schedule, stating that she "missed the window". The rapper also said that as a result she had to shift her focus to "Trouble", which she confirmed as the second single from Reclassified in the same announcement. According to a Music Times report, speculation arose among the media and the rapper's fans that the music video had been cancelled because of her controversial live performance of the song with MØ on Saturday Night Live. An accompanying black-and-white lyric video for "Beg for It" premiered on Azalea's Vevo account on 24 November 2014. In the video, the rapper's bars are criss-crossed over an old cinema screen. It also featured imagery of static wild cats.

== Formats and track listings ==
- Digital download
1. "Beg for It" (featuring MØ) – 2:58
- Digital download – Remixes EP
1. "Beg for It" (featuring MØ) [ETC!ETC! Remix] – 3:07
2. "Beg for It" (featuring MØ) [Riddim Commission Remix] – 4:50
3. "Beg for It" (featuring MØ) [The Heavy Trackerz Remix] – 3:29
4. "Beg for It" (featuring MØ) [Zoo Station Remix] – 3:43
5. "Beg for It" (featuring MØ) [R3II Remix] – 2:58
6. "Beg for It" (featuring MØ) [SloWolf Remix] – 3:04

== Credits and personnel ==
Management

- Recorded at Record Plant, Los Angeles; Sarm West Studios, Grove Studios, London; Downtown Music Studios, New York
- Mixed at The Mix Spot, Los Angeles
- Mastered at Abbey Road Studios, London
- Published by Grand Hustle / Sony ATV / Blacksmith Music / Turn First Music Publishing / Sony ATV EMI / Universal Music Publishing / Pen Paper Music / Lateral Publishing

Personnel

- Amethyst Kelly – songwriter, lead vocals
- Karen Ørsted – lead vocals
- Charlotte Aitchison – songwriter, additional vocals
- The Invisible Men – songwriters, producers
- Kurtis McKenzie – songwriter, drums and programming, keyboards
- Jon Turner – songwriter
- The Arcade – producers
- Antonia Karamani – background vocals
- George Astasio – drums and programming
- Jon Shave – keyboards
- Jason Pebworth – keyboards
- Daniel Zaidenstadt – recording
- Paul Falcone – recording
- Anthony Kilhoffer – mixing
- Kyle Ross – mixing assistant
- Miles Showell – mastering

Credits and personnel adapted from the Reclassified album liner notes.

== Charts ==
=== Weekly charts ===
Chart (2014–2015)	Peak position
Australia (ARIA)	29
Australian Urban (ARIA)	2
Belgium (Ultratop Flanders)	9
Belgium (Ultratop Wallonia)	19
Belgium Urban (Ultratop)	25
Canada Hot 100 (Billboard)	44
Canada CHR/Top 40 (Billboard)	24
Canada Hot AC (Billboard)	46
CIS Airplay (TopHit)	196
Germany (Deutsche Black Charts)	4
Scotland (Official Charts Company)	88
UK Singles (Official Charts Company)	111
UK Hip Hop/R&B (Official Charts)	16
US Billboard Hot 100	27
US Dance Airplay (Billboard)	15
US Dance Club Songs (Billboard)	3
US Hot R&B/Hip-Hop Songs (Billboard)	8
US Hot Rap Songs (Billboard)	5
US Pop Airplay (Billboard)	11
US Rhythmic Airplay (Billboard)	4

=== Year-end charts ===
Chart (2014)	Position
Australian Urban (ARIA)	37
Germany (Deutsche Black Charts)	140

Chart (2015)	Position
Germany (Deutsche Black Charts)	158
US Dance Club Songs (Billboard)	24
US Hot Rap Songs (Billboard)	33
US Hot R&B/Hip-Hop Digital Songs (Billboard)	34
US Rhythmic Songs (Billboard)	45

== Certifications ==
Region	Certification	Certified units/sales
United States (RIAA)	Platinum	1,000,000^{‡}
^{‡} Sales+streaming figures based on certification alone.

== Release history ==
Country	Date	Format	Version	Label	Ref.
United States	24 October 2014	Digital download (made available for purchase upon pre-ordering Reclassified on iTunes)	Single	Def Jam	
United States	28 October 2014	Contemporary hit radio; rhythmic contemporary	Single	Def Jam	
United Kingdom	24 November 2014	Digital download	Single	Virgin EMI	
Australia	18 December 2014	Digital download	Remixes EP	Virgin EMI	
United Kingdom	25 January 2015	Digital download	Remixes EP	Virgin EMI	
