= Labirinto (Nazareth) =

- Brazilian tango by Ernesto Nazareth
- Key: G♭ major
- Year: 1917
- Publisher: Sampaio, Araújo & Cia.
- Duration: 4 minutes
- Scoring: Solo piano

Labirinto (Portuguese: Labyrinth) is a Brazilian tango for solo piano written by Brazilian composer Ernesto Nazareth.

== Background ==
Labirinto was composed at a time when Nazareth was a regular performer in different cafés and cinemas in Rio de Janeiro, his hometown. Nazareth chiefly composed music for publication and for his own performance. The tango was published in 1917 by Casa Arthur Napoleão (Sampaio, Araújo & Cia.) and was dedicated to the composer's friend Pedro F. Dantas. It was right around this time when Nazareth met French composer Darius Milhaud, Milhaud, who lived in Brazil between 1917 and 1919 while serving as secretary to Paul Claudel, became fascinated by the urban, syncopated dance style of Rio, so much so that he incorporated Nazareth's motifs from that exact period into his compositions, including L'homme et son désir (1918) and Le bœuf sur le toit (1920). Milhaud's relationship with Nazareth helped increase the latter's popularity outside Brazil. Labirinto was part of the composer's concert repertoire, and he performed it in several recitals during his 1926 tour of São Paulo and again in 1932 at the Studio Nicolas.

== Structure ==
The piece is scored for solo piano and is written in the uncommon key of G♭ major, although the trio section is in C♭ major.. It lasts approximately four minutes and comprises 129 bars, including repeats. No tempo indications are given anywhere in the score; however, Nazareth provides expression markings at the beginning of each section. Section A is marked "gracioso" (gracefully), Section B "com ímpeto" (with passionate energy), and Section C "scherzando" (playfully). The piece is in 2/4 time and contains no further time signature changes.

The piece is structured as follows:

Structure of Ernesto Nazareth's Labirinto
Section		Bars	Key
Section A		17	G♭ major
Section A (Repeat)		16	G♭ major
Section B		16	G♭ major
Section B (Repeat)		16	G♭ major
Section A (Repeat)		16	G♭ major
Trio	Section C	16	C♭ major
Trio	Section C (repeat)	16	C♭ major
Section A (Repeat)		16	G♭ major

== Recordings ==
The following is a list of recordings of Labirinto:

Pianist	Date of recording	Place of recording	Label	Notes
Joshua Rifkin	August 1990	St. George's Church, Bristol, UK	London Records / Decca	
Yukio Miyazaki	1995	—	Victor Entertainment	
