= Six flats =

Six flats may refer to:

- G-flat major, a major musical key with six flats
- E-flat minor, a minor musical key with six flats
- Flat-six engine, a type of piston engine
