= Seven flats =

Seven flats may refer to:

- C-flat major, a major musical key with seven flats
- A-flat minor, a minor musical key with seven flats
