= Shatrov =

Shatrov (Russian: Шатров) is a surname. Notable people with the surname include:

- Ilya Shatrov (1879 (or 1885)–1952), Russian military musician, conductor, and composer
- Mikhail Shatrov (1932–2010), Soviet playwright
