= D-flat =

D-flat or D♭ may refer to:

- The musical pitch D♭
  - D-flat major
  - D-flat minor
