= Eric Baumann =

Eric Baumann or Bauman may refer to:

- Eric Baumann (cyclist) (born 1980), German road bicycle racer
- Eric Baumann (musicologist) (born 1962), German musicologist
- Eric Bauman (eBaum), founder of eBaum's World
- Eric C. Bauman (born 1958), American politician
