= G-flat =

G-flat may refer to:

- G-flat major
- G-flat minor
- The musical pitch G♭
