= C-flat =

C-flat may refer to:

- The musical pitch C♭
- C-flat major, a major scale based on C♭
- C-flat minor, a minor scale based on C♭
