= Heavy Crown (song) =

Song by Iggy Azalea featuring Ellie Goulding

from the album Reclassified
- Released: 21 November 2014
- Recorded: 2014
- Studio: Sarm West Coast (London, England); British Grove (London, England)
- Genre: Hip hop; pop; electronica
- Length: 3:52
- Label: Grand Hustle: Def Jam; Virgin EMI
- Songwriters: Iggy Azalea; Ellie Goulding; The Invisible Men; Jon Turner; Salt Wives
- Producers: The Invisible Men; Salt Wives

"Heavy Crown" is a song recorded by Australian rapper Iggy Azalea featuring English singer Ellie Goulding, recorded for Reclassified (2014), the reissue of Azalea's debut studio album The New Classic (2014). Azalea and Goulding co-wrote the song with its producers, Salt Wives and The Invisible Men, with additional writing from Jon Turner. The song was recorded in 2014 at Sarm West Coast and British Grove Studios in London, England, and encompasses the hip-hop, pop, and electronica genres, and was released through Grand Hustle Records, Def Jam Recordings, and Virgin EMI Records on the 21st of November, 2014, as the 11th track to Reclassified.

"Heavy Crown" received generally positive reviews from critics, who commended Azalea's delivery on the track, finding it to be superior to that of her earlier songs.In the week of the album's release, "Heavy Crown" charted at number 9 on the Bubbling Under R&B/Hip-Hop Songs chart, and entered two digital urban subsidiary charts, the Hot Digital R&B/Hip-Hop Songs, where it peaked at 37, and the Hot Digital Rap Songs, where it peaked at 23. The track also peaked on the lower ends of the Czech and Slovak digital singles charts. "Heavy Crown" was also used as the backing track for the trailer to the 2014 Matthew Vaughn film Kingsman: The Secret Service.

== Background ==
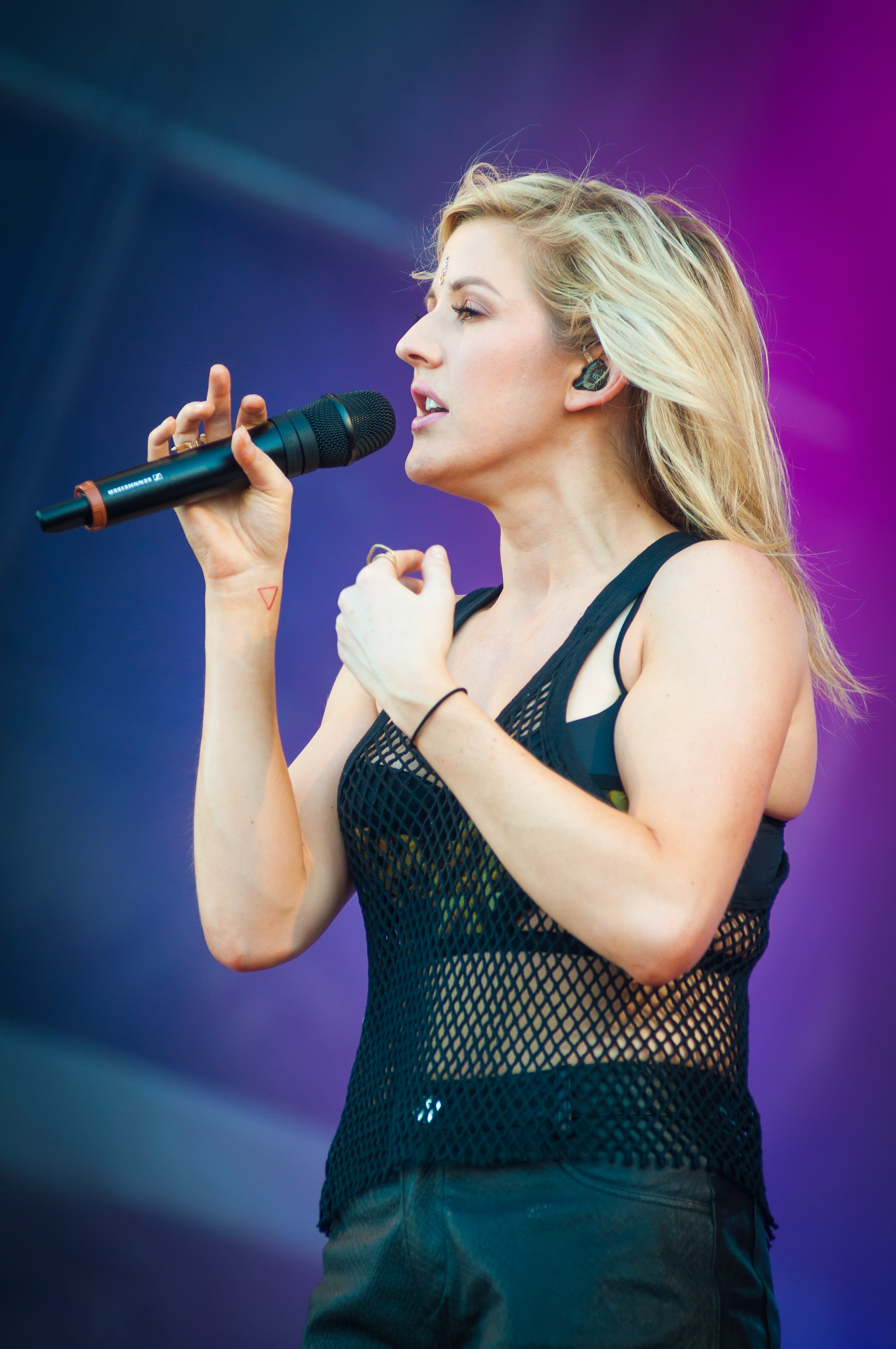
Ellie Goulding (pictured in 2014) contributed vocals to the chorus of "Heavy Crown".

Azalea first announced the song in September 2014, in one of many tweets she made where she discussed Reclassified, one in-particular reading "Me and Ellie Goulding have a nice little numberrrr together on there. FYI". During the promotional campaign leading up to the release of Reclassified, Azalea revealed that she would be collaborating with Ellie Goulding on a track titled "Heavy Crown" featured in the film Kingsman: The Secret Service. In October 2014, while giving an interview with Radio.com, Azalea mentioned her longtime desire to work with Goulding, and after meeting her several times, was approached about a song that would eventually become "Heavy Crown". She recalled one meeting, "she played it for me and I was in love with it and just felt it was so kind of appropriate for this to be our collaboration", because it "brings out something different in both artists that you don't usually see." On 14 November, a preview of "Heavy Crown" was uploaded to Azalea's VEVO channel. In December 2014, "Trouble" was announced to be the next single from Reclassified, as opposed to "Heavy Crown". Fans reacted badly, leading to Azalea releasing a statement explaining that test audiences had preferred "Trouble" over "Heavy Crown", and that the duet with Goulding was not "formatted for pop or rhythmic radio".

== Composition ==
"Heavy Crown" is a hip-hop, pop, electronica track that runs for a total duration of three minutes and fifty-two seconds. Jonathan Viray from HypeTrak described the song as an "aggressive, warmongering track dedicated to her haters." Jim Farber from the New York Daily News commented that "'Heavy Crown' has a tribal rock beat and a cocky cameo vocal from Ellie Goulding", and went on to analyse the lyrics, referring to Azalea's dispute with Snoop Dogg, "one new verse from Iggy addresses a recent, and light-hearted, beef. 'Get rid of the makeup/let’s be just who you is,' Azalea raps at one point, alluding to a series of tit-for-tat spats in October with Snoop Dogg.". Latin Post writer Esther Jang described Goulding's delivery of the chorus as her using her "signature echo-y voice", going on to describe the tracks production as "'70s bass guitar-heavy rock".

== Critical reception ==
"Heavy Crown" received generally positive reviews from music critics. Kevipod from Direct Lyrics described the song as "the most-anticipated track" from Reclassified, writing "love the contrast between the menacing, raucous Iggy Azalea verses to the vulnerable Ellie choruses". When the track premiered ahead of the release of Reclassified, one writer from Capital wrote that "it doesn't disappoint!". Carl Smith from SugarScape described the track as "SASS CENTRAL", ending his review with "it's generally just our new office jam". The track was also well received by Jim Farber of the New York Daily News, who commended the tracks instrumental and Goulding's "cocky" cameo. In a positive review, Nolan Feeney from TIME commented that "'Heavy Crown' won’t change the minds of anyone who’s already written off the rapper, but Iggy's double-time rap over the militaristic march seems more at ease than the occasionally clunky verses on early singles." He went on to describe Azalea's first verse in the song as "unforgettable", and described Goulding's vocals as "smooth". A writer for Fuse commented that "Iggy and Ellie know they're on top and aren't planning on moving from their spot anytime soon."

Upon Reclassified's release, many critics deemed "Heavy Crown" to be a standout cut from the album. Allan Raible of ABC News picked the track as one of three 'focus tracks' from Reclassified, writing "'Heavy Crown' is interesting because during the verses, the beat is really hard-hitting and during the chorus, the music recedes to give Goulding a lush minimalist backdrop. It creates an interesting bit of contrast." A writer for The Cavalier Daily also thought of "Heavy Crown" as a standout track from Reclassified, and described it as a harsher alternative to Azalea's 2014 single "Black Widow", specifically the song's "much harder beat drop".

In a mixed review of the song, Daryl Nelson from The Boombox thought that Azalea seemed "pissed" on the track, and questioned the over-usage of the term "hater". Jake Rickun, a writer for the Badger Herald, panned Reclassified. In his review, he described "Heavy Crown" as an ironic statement, "but it’s on 'Heavy Crown,' in a candid moment of irony, where Azalea is most telling. 'Get rid of the makeup let us just see who you is,' she raps. For an Australian-born rapper who denies her roots and sits comfortably in American culture, Azalea seems to forget how much proverbial makeup she cakes on herself".

=== Accolades ===
Digital Spy named "Heavy Crown" as one of their weekly '10 Tracks You Need To Hear', placing the song at number three on their list, writing "together they deliver a hardline and bolshy hip-hop number that is sure to help secure that chart throne for a little longer yet". Fuse placed the track at number eleven on their list of the '12 Best Female Collaborations Of 2014', describing the track as a "(tragically) under-appreciated jam".

== Credits and personnel ==
Credits adapted from Reclassified liner notes.

Locations

Recorded at Sarm West Coast and Grove Studios. (London, UK)

Personnel

- Iggy Azalea – songwriting, vocals
- Ellie Goulding – songwriting, vocals
- Jon Turner – songwriting
- The Invisible Men – songwriting, production, mixing
- Salt Wives – songwriting, production, mixing
- Daniel Zaidenstadt – vocal recording
- Alex Oriet – drums and programming, keyboards, guitar
- David Phelan – drums and programming, keyboards, guitar
- Jon Shave – drums and programming, keyboards
- George Astasio – drums and programming, guitar
- Jason Pebworth – keyboards

== Charts ==
Chart (2014–15)	Peak position
Czech Republic Singles Digital (ČNS IFPI)	77
Slovakia Singles Digital (ČNS IFPI)	73
US Bubbling Under R&B/Hip-Hop Songs (Billboard)	9
US Hot Digital R&B/Hip-Hop Songs (Billboard)	37
