= F-flat =

F-flat may refer to:

- F-flat major
- F-flat minor, enharmonic to E minor
- The musical pitch F♭
