= List of symphonies in E-flat minor =

The list of symphonies in E♭ minor includes:

- Philip Greeley Clapp
  - Symphony No. 9 "The Pioneers" (1931)
- Jordan Grigg
  - Symphony No. 12 (1993)
- Koichi Kishi
  - Buddha Symphony (1934)
- Rued Langgaard
  - Symphony No. 4 "Leaf Fall" (1916)
  - Symphony No. 10 "Yon Hall of Thunder" (1944–45)
- Nikolai Myaskovsky
  - Symphony No. 6 "Revolutionary", Op. 23 (1921–23)
- Vyacheslav Ovchinnikov
  - Symphony No. 1 (1956–57)
  - Symphony No. 2 "Yuri Gagarin" for String Orchestra (1956, rev 1972–73)
- Sergei Prokofiev
  - Symphony No. 6, Op. 111 (1947)
- Nikolai Rimsky-Korsakov
  - Symphony No. 1, Op. 1 (first version of 1861-65)
- Joseph Ryelandt
  - Symphony No. 4, Op. 55 (1913)
- Arnold Schoenberg
  - Chamber Symphony No. 2, Op. 38 (1906/1939)
- Rodion Shchedrin
  - Symphony No. 1 (1956–58)
- Alexander Tcherepnin
  - Symphony No. 2, Op. 77 (1947–51)
- Ralph Vaughan Williams
  - Symphony No. 7 "Sinfonia Antartica" (1949–52, partly based on his music for the film Scott of the Antarctic).
- Felix Woyrsch
  - Symphony No. 3, Op. 70 (1921)
