= Reclassified =

2014 studio album (reissue) by Iggy Azalea

Studio album (reissue) by Iggy Azalea
- Released: 21 November 2014
- Recorded: 2013–2014
- Genres: Pop; hip-hop; R&B
- Length: 41:00
- Labels: Grand Hustle; Def Jam; Virgin EMI
- Producers: The Invisible Men; The Arcade; 1st Down; The Messengers; Stargate; Reeva & Black; Salt Wives; Darryl Reid

Iggy Azalea chronology
The New Classic (2014)	Reclassified (2014)	Survive the Summer (2018)

Singles from Reclassified
- 1. "Beg for It" Released: 24 October 2014; 2. "Trouble" Released: 24 February 2015

Reclassified is the reissue of Australian rapper Iggy Azalea's debut studio album, The New Classic (2014). It was released internationally on 21 November 2014 by Virgin EMI Records, and in the United States on 24 November by Grand Hustle Records and Def Jam Recordings. The Invisible Men, The Arcade, The Messengers, Stargate, and Reeva & Black returned to produce the album, alongside 1st Down, Salt Wives, and Darryl Reid. The album features new guest appearances from MØ, Jennifer Hudson, and Ellie Goulding.

Released seven months after its parent album, Reclassified featured five newly recorded songs, including the singles "Beg for It" (featuring MØ) and "Trouble" (featuring Jennifer Hudson), the promotional single "Iggy SZN", "Heavy Crown" (featuring Ellie Goulding), and the opening track, "We in This Bitch". The album also features most of the tracks from The New Classic, including all five singles, the album track "Don't Need Y'all", and two New Classic bonus tracks ("Bounce" and "Rolex"). Some tracks from The New Classic were excluded, but later included on the Japan deluxe edition on the album.

Upon its release, Reclassified received positive reviews from music critics, some even more positive than the original album. Commercially, the album peaked at number sixteen on the US Billboard 200 becoming her second consecutive entry on the chart, also charting in countries such as Australia, Denmark, Sweden and the United Kingdom. "Beg for It" was modestly successful, charting at number 29 on the ARIA Charts and number 27 on the Billboard Hot 100. "Trouble" was more successful, peaking at number 10 on the ARIA Charts and number 7 on the UK singles chart. "Iggy SZN" and "Heavy Crown" also charted, despite the latter track not being released as a single.

== Background ==
In April 2014, Azalea released her debut album The New Classic. Following its release, The New Classic debuted at number three on the US Billboard 200 and in the top five of several international markets. The album also topped the Billboard R&B/Hip-Hop Albums and Rap Albums charts. It was met with mixed reviews from music critics. The album's fourth single "Fancy" became a breakthrough hit for Azalea, peaking at number one on the US Billboard Hot 100, holding the top spot for seven consecutive weeks. It went on to become the longest running number one single from a female rapper as a lead artist surpassing "Lady Marmalade", which featured American rapper Lil' Kim. The following single "Black Widow" peaked at number three on the US Hot 100.

On 4 September 2014, Azalea announced that she would be reissuing her debut studio album The New Classic. She commented that a collaboration with English recording artist Ellie Goulding would be included on the forthcoming project, and previewed the tracks "Beg for It" and a scrapped solo recording from The New Classic recording sessions titled "Cheeks". Azalea later revealed that she would be collaborating with Ellie Goulding on a track called "Heavy Crown" featured in the film Kingsman: The Secret Service. In October, a friend of Azalea uploaded a video on her Instagram account. The video featured her and Azalea in a car, listening to the new song "Beg for It". Another song was also teased via Instagram entitled "Iggy SZN". Azalea then confirmed that "Beg for It", featuring Danish singer MØ, would be her next single. The album was recorded in Los Angeles.

== New material ==
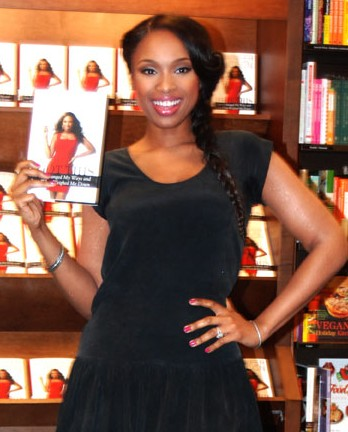
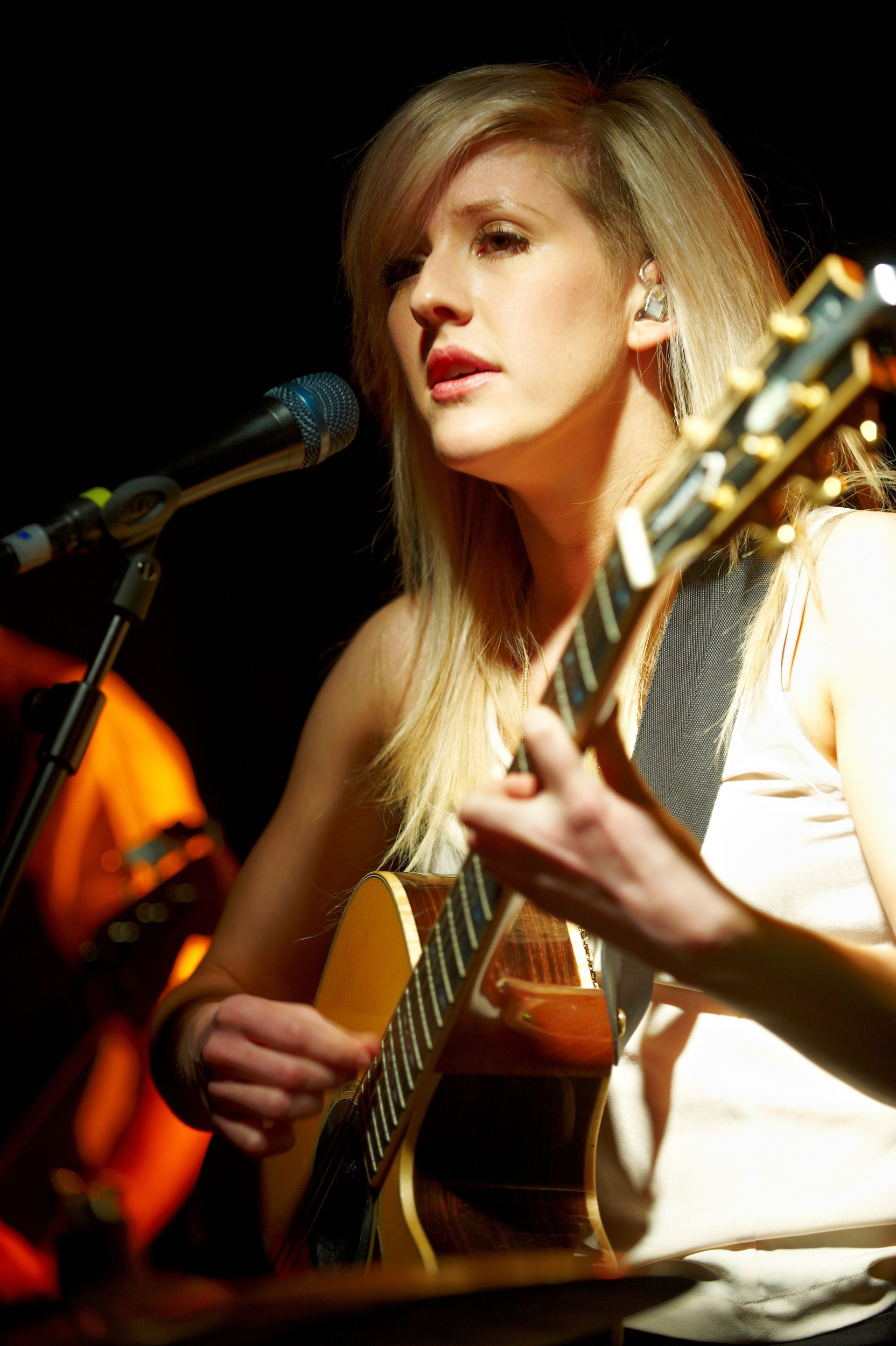
Jennifer Hudson (left) features on "Trouble", while Ellie Goulding (right) contributes vocals to "Heavy Crown"

During an interview with Extra at the Vevo Certified SuperFanFest on 8 October 2014, Azalea commented that she was "really excited" about her upcoming release saying that the new material was "uptempo and fun," adding that she "did a lot more collaborations because I felt like I had doors open for me and I had the opportunity to collaborate with artists that I didn't have before when I made my first album, so this time I got to kind of call whoever I wanted up and do my dream collaborations – it's really exciting!" During yet another interview with Radio.com backstage at the CBS Radio We Can Survive concert at the Hollywood Bowl on 24 October 2014, Azalea mentioned her longtime desire to work with Ellie Goulding and after meeting several times she was approached by Goulding about a song that would become "Heavy Crown", recalling "she played it for me and I was in love with it and just felt it was so kind of appropriate for this to be our collaboration," because it "brings out something different in both artists that you don't usually see." Most notably, the track shows off an edgier side of Goulding, whose voice Azalea called "unique and ethereal sounding." "She loved it because she felt like she doesn't do things that are as aggressive as our song together," Azalea explained.

With the expanded re-release, Azalea also got to team up with Jennifer Hudson for a second time, after being featured on Hudson's song "He Ain't Goin' Nowhere" off her third studio album JHUD, "It kind of has a doo-wop feel," Azalea said, also mentioning her desire to do something different from her musical style and being excited about performing it; "It's kind of something you'd picture Aretha Franklin singing."

In contrast to the new material, some of the tracks from the original album were left off in favor of the newer songs. Older discarded songs included the Mavado-assisted "Lady Patra", "Impossible Is Nothing", "New Bitch", and intro track "Walk the Line". These tracks were all included on the Japanese-exclusive edition of the album.

== Release and promotion ==
The artwork for Reclassified was revealed on 9 October 2014. Azalea then premiered an album track, "Iggy SZN", made available with the album pre-order on iTunes stores worldwide. She performed the first single "Beg for It", featuring MØ, for the first time in the fourth episode of Saturday Night Live's season 40, hosted by Jim Carrey. On 12 November, Azalea uploaded on her YouTube channel a preview of the first track on Reclassified, "We In This Bitch". On 14 November, another preview of "Heavy Crown" was also uploaded on the channel. On 17 November, a final album track preview for "Trouble", featuring Jennifer Hudson, was also unveiled. The reissue was released internationally on 21 November 2014 and in the United States on 24 November 2014. Azalea also performed "Beg for It" during a medley with "Fancy", featuring Charli XCX, at the 2014 American Music Awards at the Nokia Theatre L.A. Live in Los Angeles on 23 November 2014, where she won two awards for Favorite Rap/Hip-Hop Album and Favorite Rap/Hip-Hop Artist. On 24 November 2014, an official lyric video for the track premiered on her Vevo channel. She also teamed up with The Roots for a performance at The Tonight Show Starring Jimmy Fallon on 26 November 2014.

== Singles ==
"Beg for It" was released as the first single from the reissue in the United States on 24 October 2014. It debuted at number ninety-two on the Billboard Hot 100 chart for the week ending 8 November 2014, peaking at number twenty-seven and becoming Azalea's sixth top 40 hit on the chart in 2014. In Australia, the song debuted at number seventy-three on the ARIA Singles Chart for the week ending 10 November 2014, and jumped to number twenty-nine on the following week.

"Trouble", featuring Jennifer Hudson, was released as the album's second single. On 4 February 2015, Azalea and Hudson performed the song for the first time by teaming up with The Roots on The Tonight Show Starring Jimmy Fallon. The song was serviced to mainstream radio stations in the US on 24 February 2015 and an accompanying music video was also shot earlier that month, having premiered on 27 February 2015 through Azalea's VEVO channel.

Besides the two new singles, all five singles from The New Classic re-appeared on Reclassified: "Work", "Change Your Life", "Bounce", "Fancy" and "Black Widow". The track "Iggy SZN" was also released as a promotional single prior to the album's release.

== Critical reception ==
Professional ratings
Review scores
Source	Rating
AllMusic	3.5/5 stars
Idolator	4/5 stars
New York Daily News	3.5/5 stars
NME	6/10
State	3/5 stars

Reclassified received a positive reception by the music critics, Jim Farber of the New York Daily News gave Reclassified three and a half out of five stars, praising the new tracks "We in This Bitch", "Heavy Crown", "Trouble", and "Iggy SZN", stating "Luckily, most of the tracks on Reclassified actually are worth it. That's vital, since only five of the songs qualify as genuinely new." Despite praising a majority of the new tracks, he expressed distaste towards "Beg for It", expressing that it seems lazy as it "merely turns the hook from 'Fancy' on its side." He concluded, "Though Azalea ends the album with an admission that the golden headdress of pop fame "comes and goes," she gleefully states, "bitch, I got it now." For the moment, it seems like she deserves it."

Mark Beaumont of NME gave it a rating of six out of ten, a higher score than the original album version review by the same publication, claiming that "the Aussie rapper offers a slight improvement on her debut LP with this reissue." Mike Wass of Idolator gave the album a 4/5 rating calling it "as good an opportunity as any to acknowledge that the femcee's debut is actually relentlessly enjoyable," adding that "there isn't a dud track" and "of the other new cuts, 'Heavy Crown' stands out as another future hit". Rory Cashin of State gave the album three out of five stars, commenting that "the new additions are mostly winners," but "just like her first time out with this album, Iggy has a problem; trying too hard to please herself and please commercial radio." David Jeffries of AllMusic, who had also reviewed The New Classic, gave it three and a half out of five stars and said, "In the end, Reclassified is a better effort than The New Classic and offers more bang for the buck, but this "release it until you get it right" blueprint is concerning for consumers, who now have a choice between rebuying it all or seeking out the new numbers on their own."

== Commercial performance ==
In Australia, Reclassified debuted at number thirty-two on the ARIA Albums Chart for the week ending 1 December 2014, while appearing at number nineteen on its digital sales-only based version, the ARIA Digital Albums Chart, and also peaking at number 3 on the ARIA Urban Albums Chart. In the United States, it debuted at number twenty-seven on the Billboard 200 chart, with 33,638 album-equivalent units, while its parent album The New Classic also climbed back up to number seventy, with 14,155 units, for the week ending 30 November 2014. It peaked at number sixteen on the Billboard 200 chart for the week ending 4 January 2015, with 29,461 units, entering the top twenty for the first time due to a big boost as a function of album streams and single song sales. On the following week, it remained in the top twenty dropping two spots to number eighteen. In the United Kingdom, the album debuted at number one hundred eighteen and charted at number fifty-nine on the Official UK Albums Chart Top 100 and number four on the UK R&B Albums Top 40 for the week ending 10 January 2015. On 10 May 2015, Reclassified climbed eighty places re-entering the Official UK Albums Chart Top 100 at a new peak of thirty-eight, after appearing at number twenty-two on the Official Midweek UK Albums Chart Update on 6 May 2015.

== Track listing ==
Reclassified – Standard edition
No.	Title	Writer(s)	Producer(s)	Length
1.	"We in This Bitch"	Amethyst Kelly; Jason Pebworth; George Astasio; Jonathan Shave; Salt Wives; Jon Turner	The Invisible Men; Salt Wives	4:10
2.	"Work"	Kelly; Pebworth; Astasio; Shave; Trocon Markous Roberts; Natalie Sims	FKi 1st; The Invisible Men	3:43
3.	"Change Your Life" (featuring T.I.)	Kelly; Sims; Raja Kumari; The Messengers; Lovy Longomba; Clifford Harris, Jr.	The Messengers	3:40
4.	"Beg for It" (featuring MØ)	Kelly; Charlotte Aitchison; Kurtis McKenzie; Turner	The Invisible Men; The Arcade	2:58
5.	"Black Widow" (featuring Rita Ora)	Kelly; Tor Erik Hermansen; Mikkel Storleer Eriksen; Benjamin Levin; Katheryn Hudson; Sarah Hudson	Stargate	3:29
6.	"Trouble" (featuring Jennifer Hudson)	Kelly; Judith Hill; Isabella Summers; Pebworth; Astasio; Shave; Salt Wives; Turner	The Invisible Men; Salt Wives	2:46
7.	"Don't Need Y'all"	Kelly; Pebworth; Astasio; Shave; Turner; Jon Mills	The Invisible Men; The Arcade	3:33
8.	"Rolex"	Kelly; Pebworth; Astasio; Shave; Turner; McKenzie	The Invisible Men; The Arcade	3:23
9.	"Iggy SZN"	Kelly; Pebworth; Astasio; Shave; Darryl Reid; Turner	The Invisible Men; Darryl Reid	3:20
10.	"Fancy" (featuring Charli XCX)	Kelly; Aitchison; Pebworth; Astasio; Shave; Turner; McKenzie	The Invisible Men; The Arcade	3:19
11.	"Heavy Crown" (featuring Ellie Goulding)	Kelly; Goulding; Pebworth; Astasio; Shave; Salt Wives; Turner	The Invisible Men; Salt Wives	3:52
12.	"Bounce"	Kelly; Talay Riley; Oladayo Olatunji; Sims; Mark Hadfield; Mike Di Scala; Jochem George Paap	Reeva & Black	2:47
Total length:				41:00

Reclassified – Japan deluxe edition (bonus tracks)
No.	Title	Writer(s)	Producer(s)	Length
13.	"Walk the Line"	Kelly; Mckenzie; Astasio; Shave; Pebworth; Turner	The Invisible Men; The Arcade	3:38
14.	"100" (featuring Watch the Duck)	Kelly; Harris, Jr.; O. White; Jesse Rankins; Eddie Smith III; Johnathan Wells	Watch the Duck	4:09
15.	"New Bitch"	Kelly; Shave; Sims; Pebworth; Astasio; Joey Dyer	The Invisible Men; Dyer	3:37
16.	"Impossible Is Nothing"	Kelly; Mills; Mckenzie; Dyer; Astasio; Shave; Pebworth; Gabriel Yared	The Invisible Men; The Arcade	3:10
17.	"Goddess"	Kelly; Shave; Pebworth; Astasio; Turner; Mills; Frank Farian	The Invisible Men; The Arcade	3:10
18.	"Lady Patra" (featuring Mavado)	Kelly; David Brooks; Shave; Turner; Pebworth; Astasio; Mckenzie; Theron Thomas; Timothy Thomas; Daler Mehndi	The Invisible Men; The Arcade	3:56
19.	"Fuck Love"	Kelly; Turner; Mills; Theron Thomas; Timothy Thomas; Shave; Pebworth; Astasio	The Invisible Men; The Arcade	2:39
20.	"Just Askin'"	Kelly; Shave; Sims; Pebworth; Astasio; Ryan Woodcock; Roberts	The Invisible Men; WoodysProduce	2:58
21.	"Fancy" (Dabin & Apashe Remix)	Kelly; Aitchison	Dabin & Apashe
22.	"Black Widow" (86 Remix)	Kelly; Hermansen; Eriksen; Levin; Perry; Hudson	86

== Personnel ==
Credits for The New Classic adapted from Barnes & Noble

Performance credits

- Iggy Azalea – primary artist, vocals, background vocals
- Paul Burton – trombone
- 1st Down – drums, keyboards
- Michael Davis – trumpet
- Jon Mills – guitar, drums, keyboards
- T.I. – vocals
- Jon Shave – drums, keyboards
- Jason Pebworth – keyboards
- George Astasio – guitar, drums, keyboards
- Jennifer Hudson – vocals
- Rita Ora – vocals
- Ellie Goulding – vocals
- Marco Bernardis – saxophone
- Alex Oriet – guitar, drums, keyboards
- Charli XCX – vocals
- Kurtis McKenzie – drums, keyboards
- Darryl Reid – drums, keyboards
- Ms. D – background vocals
- David Phelan – guitar, drums, keyboards
- MØ – Vocals
- Raja Kumari – background vocals
- Sean Momberger – keyboards
- BB Diamond – vocals
- Antonia Karamani – background vocals

Technical credits

- Bill Mims – vocal engineer
- Stuart Hawkes – mastering
- Miles Showell – mastering
- Stargate – programming, producer, instrumentation
- Harvey Mason Jr. – vocal engineer
- Andrew Hey – assistant vocal engineer
- 1st Down – programming, producer
- Jon Mills – programming
- Danny D. – executive producer
- Eric Weaver – vocal engineer
- Jon Shave – programming
- Miles Walker – assistant vocal engineer
- Jason Pebworth – programming
- George Astasio – programming
- Tim Blacksmith – executive producer
- Adam Messinger – producer
- Nasri Atweh – producer
- Sam Farr – vocal engineer
- Elliot Carter – vocal engineer
- Alex Oriet – programming
- Mikkel Eriksen – vocal engineer
- The Invisible Men – producer
- Sarah Stennett – executive producer
- Kurtis McKenzie – programming
- Darryl Reid – programming, producer
- Daniel Zaidenstadt – vocal engineer
- Reeva & Black – producer, vocal engineer
- The Arcade – producer
- David Phelan – programming
- Chris Berdine – packaging
- The Messengers – producer
- Sean Momberger – programming
- Thomas Whiteside – cover photo
- Saltwives – producer

== Charts ==
=== Weekly charts ===
Chart (2014–15)	Peak position
Australian Albums (ARIA)	32
Australian Urban Albums (ARIA)	3
Danish Albums (Hitlisten)	31
Japanese Albums (Oricon)	115
Scottish Albums (Official Charts)	50
Swedish Albums (Sverigetopplistan)	32
UK Albums (Official Charts)	38
UK R&B Albums (Official Charts)	4
US Billboard 200	16
US Top R&B/Hip-Hop Albums (Billboard)	6

=== Year-end charts ===
Chart (2014)	Position
Australian Urban Albums (ARIA)	43
Chart (2015)	Position
Australian Urban Albums (ARIA)	46
US Billboard 200	117
US Top R&B/Hip-Hop Albums (Billboard)	64

== Certifications ==
Region	Certification	Certified units/sales
Poland (ZPAV)	Gold	10,000^{‡}
New Zealand (RMNZ)	Gold	7,500^{‡}
United Kingdom (BPI)	Gold	100,000^{‡}
^{‡} Sales+streaming figures based on certification alone.

== Release history ==
Region	Date	Format(s)	Label	Catalogue no.	Ref.
Australia	21 November 2014	CD	Virgin EMI	4709676	
Australia	21 November 2014	Digital download	Virgin EMI	None	
New Zealand	21 November 2014	Digital download	Virgin EMI	None	
United Kingdom	24 November 2014	CD	Virgin EMI	None	
United Kingdom	24 November 2014	Digital download	Virgin EMI	None	
United States	24 November 2014	CD	Def Jam Recordings	None	
United States	24 November 2014	Digital download	Def Jam Recordings	None	
Argentina	25 November 2014	Digital download	Universal Music Argentina	None	
Japan	10 December 2014	CD	Universal Music Japan	UICR-1115	
