= D-flat minor =

Minor key based on D-flat

D-flat minor Alternative notation
- Relative key: F-flat major →enharmonic: E major
- Parallel key: D-flat major
- Dominant key: A-flat minor
- Subdominant key: G-flat minor →enharmonic: F-sharp minor
- Enharmonic key: C-sharp minor

Component pitches
- D♭, E♭, F♭, G♭, A♭, B, C♭

D-flat minor is a musical key based on D♭, consisting of the pitches D♭, E♭, F♭, G♭, A♭, B, and C♭. Because its key signature has eight flats, requiring one double flat and six single flats, the enharmonically equivalent key of C-sharp minor is normally used instead. Its relative major is F-flat major, which is usually replaced by E major. Its parallel major is D-flat major.

The D-flat natural minor scale is:

Changes needed for the melodic and harmonic versions of the scale are written in with accidentals as necessary. The D-flat harmonic minor and melodic minor scales are:

D-flat minor is usually notated as the enharmonic key of C-sharp minor, as in the second and third measures of Amy Beach's Canticle of the Sun. However, unusually, two of Verdi's most well-known operas, La traviata and Rigoletto, both end in D-flat minor (although written with the five-flat key signature of the parallel major). Mahler's thematic motif "der kleine Appell" ("call to order") from his Fourth and Fifth Symphonies uses both notations: in his Symphony No. 4 (first movement) it is in D-flat minor, but in his Symphony No. 5 it is in C-sharp minor. In the Adagio of his Symphony No. 9, a solo bassoon interpolation following the main theme appears first in D-flat minor, returning twice more notated in C-sharp minor. Likewise, in the Adagio of Bruckner's Symphony No. 8, phrases that are tonally in D-flat minor are notated as C-sharp minor.

D-flat minor is shown in Max Reger's theory text On the Theory of Modulation.

== Scale degree chords ==
The scale-degree chords of D-flat minor are:

- Tonic – D-flat minor
- Supertonic – E-flat diminished
- Mediant – F-flat major
- Subdominant – G-flat minor
- Dominant – A-flat minor
- Submediant – B-double-flat major
- Subtonic – C-flat major

== See also ==
- Key (music)
- Major and minor
- Chord (music)
- Chord notation
- Key signature § Double flats and sharps

No.	Flats		Sharps	
No.	Major	minor	Major	minor
0	C	a	C	a
1	F	d	G	e
2	B♭	g	D	b
3	E♭	c	A	f♯
4	A♭	f	E	c♯
5	D♭	b♭	B	g♯
6	G♭	e♭	F♯	d♯
7	C♭	a♭	C♯	a♯
8	F♭	d♭	G♯	e♯
