= On the Hills of Manchuria =

1906 waltz composed by Ilya Alekseevich Shatrov

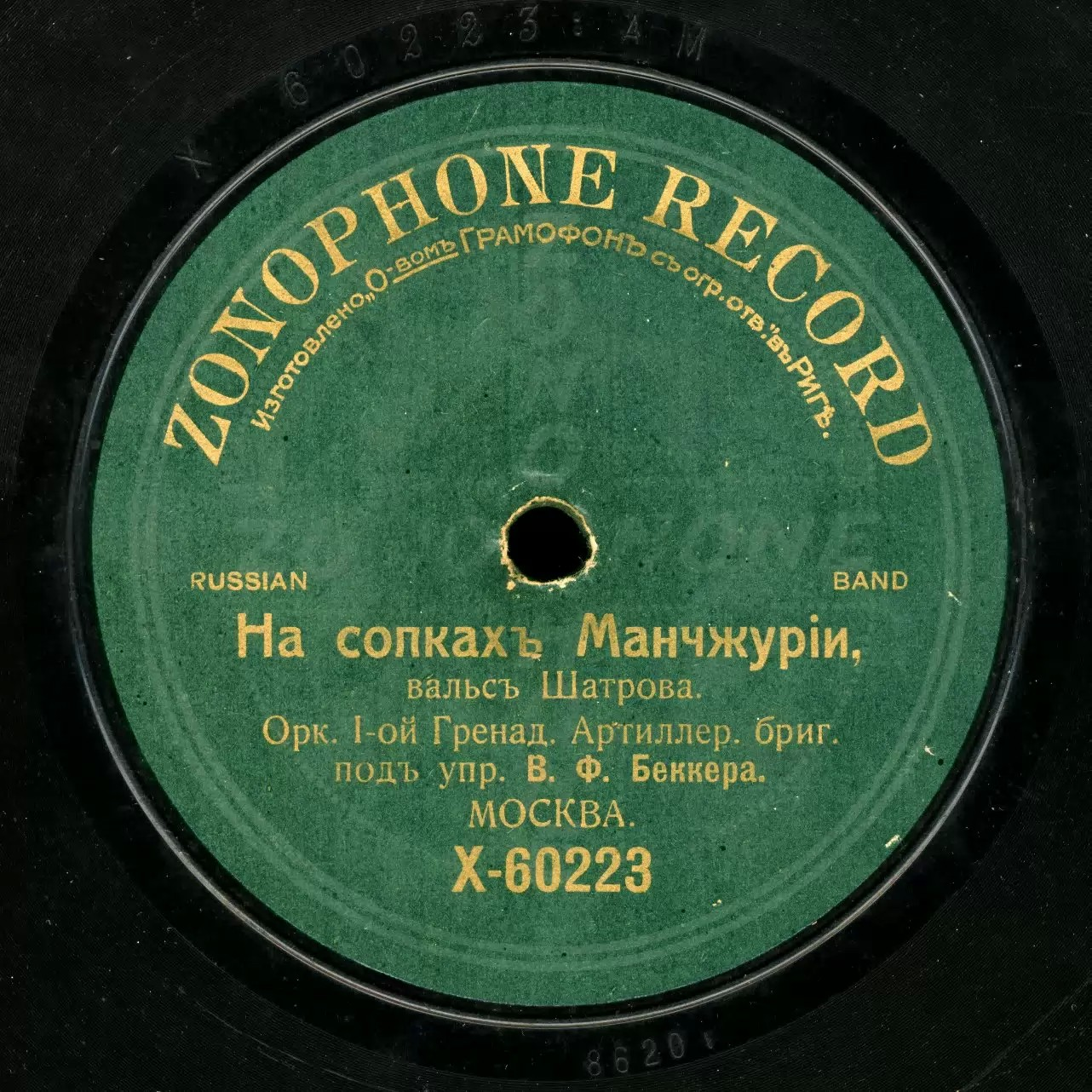

Instrumental version performed by the 1st Grenadier Artillery Brigade's orchestra, 1909

An early version of the song "On the Hills of Manchuria" performed by Michael Vavitch 1912

"On the Hills of Manchuria" (Russian: На сопках Маньчжурии, romanized: Na sopkakh Manchzhurii) is a waltz composed in 1906 by Ilya Alekseevich Shatrov. The original and orchestral arrangement is written in E-flat minor while the folk arrangement is in F minor.

The original title of the waltz was "The Mokshansky Regiment on the Hills of Manchuria" and referred to an incident during the Battle of Mukden, the disastrous final land battle of the Russo-Japanese War, when the Mokshansky Infantry Regiment was encircled by Japanese forces for 11 days, during which it sustained considerable casualties. Shatrov served in the regiment as bandmaster and composed the tune on returning from the war. While the regiment was stationed in Samara in 1906, he made the acquaintance of Oskar Knaube (1866–1920), a local music shop owner, who helped the composer to publish his work and later acquired ownership of it.

The waltz achieved colossal success and Knaube boasted of having published some 82 different editions of the piece. Soon after its publication, the poet Stepan Petrov, better known by the pen-name of Skitalets, provided the lyrics which contributed to its wider success. The original words concern fallen soldiers lying in their graves in Manchuria, but alternative words were adapted to the tune later, especially during the Second World War.

The melody is also known as "Manchurian Beat" in arrangements by The Peanuts, The Spotnicks, The Ventures, and others.

== Lyrics ==
Тихо вокруг, сопки покрыты мглой,
Вот из-за туч блеснула луна,
Могилы хранят покой.
Белеют кресты – это герои спят.
Прошлого тени кружат давно,
О жертвах боёв твердят.

Плачет, плачет мать родная,
Плачет молодая жена,
Плачут все, как один человек,
Злой рок и судьбу кляня!

Тихо вокруг, ветер туман унёс,
На сопках маньчжурских воины спят
И русских не слышат слёз.
Пусть гаолян вам навевает сны,
Спите герои русской земли,
Отчизны родной сыны.

Плачет, плачет мать родная,
Плачет молодая жена,
Плачут все, как один человек,
Злой рок и судьбу кляня!

Вы пали за Русь, погибли вы за Отчизну,
Поверьте, мы за вас отомстим
И справим кровавую тризну!

Around us, it is calm; Hills are covered by mist,
Suddenly, the moon shines through the clouds,
Graves hold their calm.
The white glow of the crosses – heroes are asleep.
The shadows of the past circle around,
Recalling the victims of battles.

Dear mother is shedding tears,
The young wife is weeping,
All like one are crying,
Cursing fate, cursing destiny!

Around us, it's calm; The wind blew the fog away,
Warriors are asleep on the hills of Manchuria
And they cannot hear the Russian tears.
Let sorghum's rustling lull you to sleep,
Sleep in peace, heroes of the Russian land,
Dear sons of the Fatherland.

Dear mother is shedding tears,
The young wife is weeping,
All like one are crying,
Cursing fate, cursing destiny!

You fell for Russia, perished for Fatherland,
Believe us, we shall avenge you
And celebrate a bloody wake!

(Transcription - Croatian-styled)
Tiho vokrug, sopki pokryty mgloj,
Vot iz-za tuč blesnula luna,
Mogily hranjat pokoj.
Belejut kresty – èto geroi spjat.
Prošlogo teni kružat davno,
O žertvah boëv tverdjat.

Plačet, plačet matʹ rodnaja,
Plačet molodaja žena,
Plačut vse, kak odin čelovek,
Zloj rok i sudʹbu kljanja!

Tiho vokrug, veter tuman unës,
Na sopkah manʹčžurskih voiny spjat
I russkih ne slyšat slëz.
Pustʹ gaoljan vam navevaet sny,
Spite geroi russkoj zemli,
Otčizny rodnoj syny.

Plačet, plačet matʹ rodnaja,
Plačet molodaja žena,
Plačut vse, kak odin čelovek,
Zloj rok i sudʹbu kljanja!

Vy pali za Rusʹ, pogibli vy za Otčiznu,
Poverʹte, my za vas otomstim
I spravim krovavuju triznu!
