= Flohwalzer =

Piano composition

Theme, notated in G♭ major

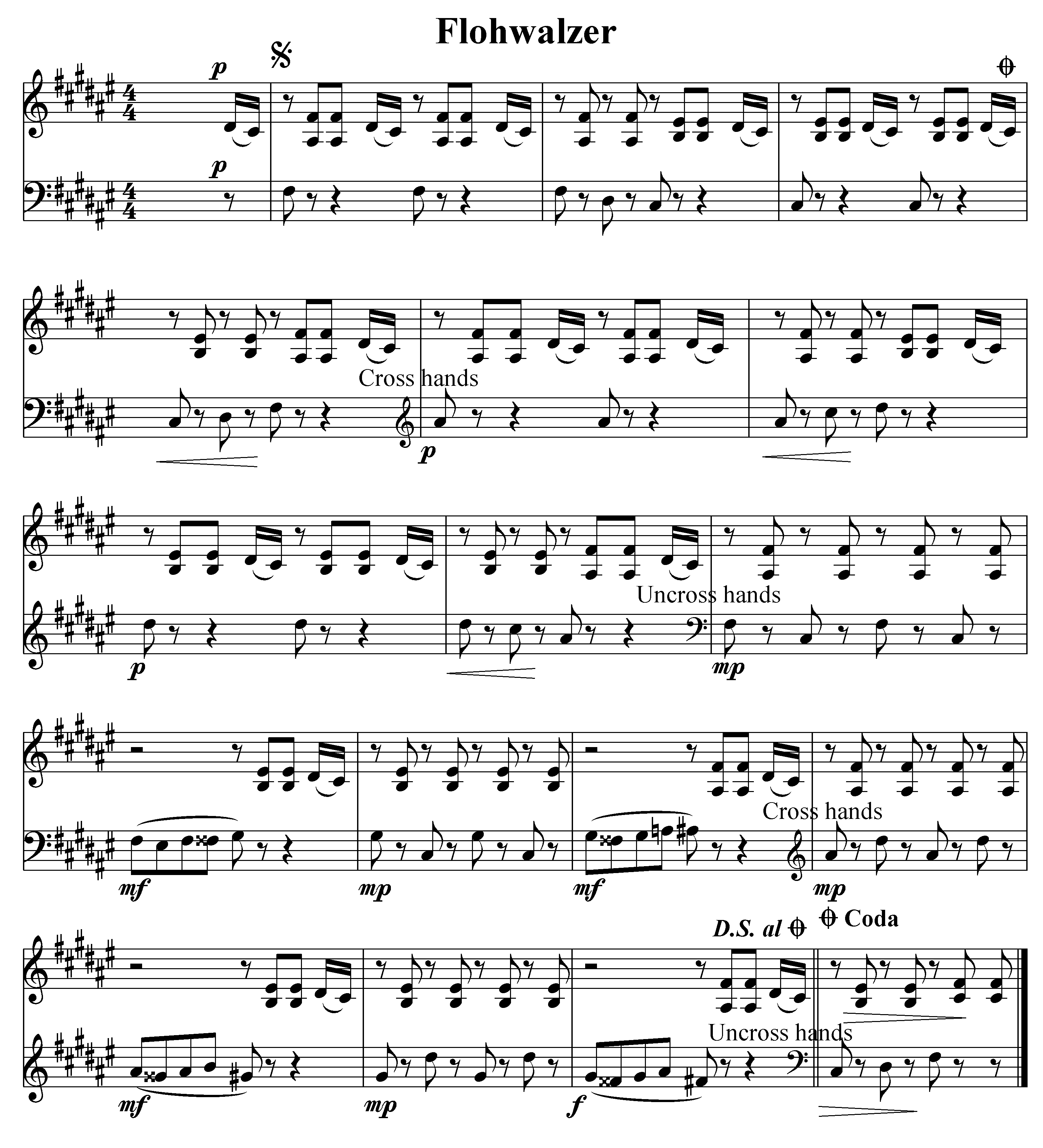
Flohwalzer, in F♯ major

Flohwalzer (German: ['floːvaltsɐ], German for "Flea Waltz") is a simple piano piece, often one of the first learned because its fingering is simple and it allows beginners to perform a piece that is harmonically and rhythmically pleasing.

== Music ==
Despite its name, the piece is not a waltz in triple meter (3/4), as it has a time signature in duple meter (2/4) and is closer to a polka or galop. The composer is unknown. In a parody of musicology writing, Eric Baumann attributes the piece to Ferdinand Loh, but this is obviously a joke ("F. Loh" = Floh, flea in German). The piece is notated in the identically sounding keys of F♯ major or G♭ major, because most of the piece's notes are played on black keys in those keys, making the fingering easier.

== International ==
The piece is known all over the world under various names:

- In Bulgaria, it is known as "Котешки марш", "Koteshki Marsh" ("Cat March").
- In Chile, it is known as "La Polka de los perros" ("Dogs' Polka").
- In China, it is called "跳蚤圆舞曲", "Tiàozao Yuánwǔqǔ" ("Flea Waltz").
- In the Czech Republic, it is known as "Prasečí valčík" ("Pig Waltz").
- In Finland, it is known as "Kissanpolkka" ("Cat's Polka").
- In French-speaking countries, it is known as "Valse des puces" ("Flea Waltz").
- In Hungary, it is known as "Szamárinduló" ("Donkey March").
- In Japan, it is known as "Neko Funjatta" (ねこふんじゃった; "I Stepped on the Cat").
- In Korean, it is known as 고양이 춤 (Goyangi chum; 'Cat Dance').
- In Mallorca, it is known as "Polca de los Tontos" ("Fools' Polka").
- In Mexico, it is called "Los Changuitos" ("The Little Monkeys").
- In the Netherlands, it is known as "Vlooienmars" ("Flea March").
- In Poland, it is known as "Kotlety" ("Cutlets").
- In Russia, it is known as "Собачий Вальс", "Sobachiy Val's" ("Dog Waltz").
- In Slovakia, it is known as "Somársky pochod" ("Donkey March").
- In Spain, it is known as "La Chocolatera".
- In Taiwan, it is known as "踩到貓兒", "Cǎidào Māo'ér" ("Stepped on a Cat").
- In Ukraine, the melody is called Собачий вальс, "Sobachyi Val's" ("Dog Waltz")
- In the United Kingdom, the melody is often called "Chopsticks", not to be confused with "Chopsticks" by Euphemia Allen.

== Arrangements ==
An elaborate variation on this piece, "Lesson One", was a hit in 1962 for pianist Russ Conway. Danish pianist Bent Fabric released a jazz-influenced version in 1963 as "Chicken Feed". The piece becomes even easier to play in piano four hands arrangements, but there are also quite virtuosic versions of such arrangements.

Swedish songwriter Thore Skogman used the piece as the basis for his 1962 song "Kalle Johansson" (which has since become the Swedish name for the melody in general), featuring lyrics about a man named Kalle Johansson, who gets in a love affair that involves him, his sister, and two of their neighbors.
