= F-flat major =

Major scale based on F-flat

F-flat major Alternative notations
- Relative key: D-flat minor →enharmonic: C-sharp minor
- Parallel key: F-flat minor →enharmonic: E minor
- Dominant key: C-flat major
- Subdominant key: B-double flat major →enharmonic: A major
- Enharmonic key: E major

Component pitches
- F♭, G♭, A♭, B, C♭, D♭, E♭

F-flat major (or the key of F-flat) is a key based on F♭, consisting of the pitches F♭, G♭, A♭, B♭♭, C♭, D♭, and E♭. Its key signature has eight flats, requiring one double flat and six single flats. Because F-flat major requires eight flats, including a B, it is almost always notated as its enharmonic equivalent of E major, with four sharps. The same is true of the relative minor of D-flat minor, usually replaced by C-sharp minor. F-flat minor, the parallel minor, would be replaced by E minor, since F-flat minor requires four double-flats.

The F-flat major scale is:

Changes needed for the melodic and harmonic versions of the scale are written in with accidentals as necessary. The F-flat harmonic major and melodic major scales are:

The scale-degree chords of F-flat major are:

- Tonic – F-flat major
- Supertonic – G-flat minor
- Mediant – A-flat minor
- Subdominant – B-double-flat major
- Dominant – C-flat major
- Submediant – D-flat minor
- Leading-tone – E-flat diminished

== Music in F-flat major ==
F-flat appears as a secondary key area in several works in flat keys. Part of Richard Strauss' Metamorphosen uses F-flat major, which one commentator has called "a bitter enharmonic parody" of the earlier manifestations of E major in the piece.

Beethoven also used F-flat major in his Piano Sonata No. 31, Op. 110. In the first movement's exposition, the transitional passage between the first and second subjects consists of arpeggiated figuration beginning in A-flat major and modulating to the dominant key of E-flat major. In the recapitulation, the key for this passage is changed to bring the second subject back in A-flat major: the transitional passage appears in a key that would theoretically be F-flat major, but which is notated in E major, presumably because Beethoven judged this easier to read – this key being a major third below the key of the earlier appearance of this passage. Likewise, the second movement (in A-flat major) of Beethoven's Piano Sonata No. 8 (Pathétique) contains six measures of what would theoretically be F-flat major, but notated as E major (keeping the 4-flat key signature of the movement, so every note in the passage has an accidental).

Another example of F-flat major being notated as E major can be found in the Adagio of Haydn's Trio No. 27 in A-flat major. The Finale of Bruckner's Symphony No. 4 employs enharmonic E for F-flat, but its coda employs F-flat directly, with a Phrygian cadence through F-flat onto the tonic.

An example of F-flat major being used directly is in Victor Ewald's Quintet No. 4 in A-flat major (Op. 8), where the entirety of the third movement is notated in this key.

The climax that occurs in the middle of Samuel Barber's Adagio for Strings resolves to F-flat major. The final cadence of John Rutter's setting of Robert Herrick's poem "What Sweeter Music" is in F-flat major.

== See also ==
- Major and minor
- Chord (music)
- Chord notation
- Key signature#Double flats and sharps

| No. | Flats | | Sharps | |
| No. | Major | minor | Major | minor |
|---|---|---|---|---|
| 0 | C | a | C | a |
| 1 | F | d | G | e |
| 2 | B♭ | g | D | b |
| 3 | E♭ | c | A | f♯ |
| 4 | A♭ | f | E | c♯ |
| 5 | D♭ | b♭ | B | g♯ |
| 6 | G♭ | e♭ | F♯ | d♯ |
| 7 | C♭ | a♭ | C♯ | a♯ |
| 8 | F♭ | d♭ | G♯ | e♯ |
