= Eric Baumann (musicologist) =

German musicologist and composer

Eric Baumann (born 1962) is a German musicologist. He is an authority on the work of Karl May. He is better known popularly for his humorous book Der Komponist Ferdinand Loh (The Composer Ferdinand Loh), which is about the anonymous children's piece Der Flohwalzer.

== Works ==
- Kleine Frühlingsmusik: für Flöte u. Klavier, Bärenreiter-Verl., 1988
- Der Komponist Ferdinand Loh und sein opus magnum, Der Flohwalzer, Atlantis, 1996, ISBN 978-3-254-00205-1
- Ein Ave Maria im Wilden Westen: Karl May als Komponist, Atlantis Musikbuch-Verlag, 2002, ISBN 978-3-254-08383-8
- Wie kam die Glace auf das Stängeli?: 150 Fragen aus der weiten Welt der Wirtschaft, Eric Baumann, Stefan Eiselin Cosmos-Verl., 2009, ISBN 978-3-305-00376-1
