= Trouble (Iggy Azalea song) =

Single by Iggy Azalea featuring Jennifer Hudson

from the album Reclassified
- Released: 24 February 2015
- Genre: Hip hop soul; doo-wop
- Length: 2:46
- Label: Def Jam; Virgin EMI
- Songwriters: Iggy Azalea; Judith Hill; Isabella Summers
- Producers: The Invisible Men; Salt Wives

Iggy Azalea singles chronology
"Beg for It" (2014)	"Trouble" (2015)	"Pretty Girls" (2015)

Jennifer Hudson singles chronology
"Go All Night" (2014)	"Trouble" (2015)	"I Still Love You" (2015)

Music video
- "Trouble" on YouTube

"Trouble" is a song by Australian rapper Iggy Azalea featuring American singer Jennifer Hudson, taken from Reclassified, the former's 2014 reissue of her debut studio album The New Classic. The song was produced by The Invisible Men and Salt Wives.

In December 2014, Azalea revealed the track would be the official second promotional track off the reissue, although no specific date for the single to be released digitally or serviced to radios was reported. It was then announced that the song would be impacting mainstream radio stations in the US on 24 February 2015, with an accompanying music video also shot earlier that month. The video premiered on 27 February 2015 on Vevo.

The song achieved commercial success, reaching the top ten in Australia and the UK, top twenty in Ireland, as well as charting in other major international territories including the US, Canada and Belgium. It was nominated for Song of the Year at the 2015 ARIA Music Awards.

== Background and release ==
On 4 September 2014, Azalea announced that she would be reissuing her debut studio album The New Classic. In October 2014, details of the reissue started to be revealed and that it would be officially released in November. During an interview with Radio.com backstage at the CBS Radio We Can Survive concert at the Hollywood Bowl on 24 October 2014, Azalea talked about her upcoming re-release Reclassified. With the expanded version of the album, Azalea got to team up with Jennifer Hudson for a second time, after being featured on Hudson's song "He Ain't Goin' Nowhere" off her third studio album JHUD, "It kind of has a doo-wop feel," Azalea said, also mentioning her desire to do something different from her musical style and being excited about performing it; "It's kind of something you'd picture Aretha Franklin singing."

In December 2014, Azalea shared through her Twitter account that she was preparing her next single, "Trouble", as the second promotional track off the reissue, while also announcing plans to shoot a music video for the previous single "Beg for It" had been scrapped. After being questioned by fans about the decision to make the track a single, Azalea answered by noting it was related to radio formats and audience testing explaining, "People need to realize they 'test' the songs with people and give them scores. That's how it works, they pick based on what scores."

On 5 February 2014, during American record producer and music industry executive Clive Davis' annual pre-Grammy Gala press day, Azalea detailed the track saying, "I think it's new for me ... because I usually do things that are so constructed and have so many stage props or choreography, but this is a really different record for me to be able to have me and [Jennifer] perform it and have that relaxed atmosphere." "It has a great, great live vibe to it," Hudson added, "It came to life for both of us when we were performing it together." "Seeing them in rehearsal today, you can see why magic is coming out of the song 'Trouble' that they'll be releasing together. I love to have these collaborations every year, in the past we had Alicia [Keys] with Aretha Franklin, Lou Reed with Rod Stewart, we've had Jennifer [Hudson] with Barry Manilow, we've had combinations that you just don't see. And I think that's why we get everybody coming back year after year," stated Davis while talking about the duo's chemistry.

Azalea claimed she knew right after collaborating for the first time with Hudson she wanted to work on another track with the singer, "I had plans, I don't know if Jennifer had plans," with Hudson responding, "I was ready when I got the call. But I think for us both [the song] took a life of its own especially when we performed it the other day [on Jimmy Fallon]. Something just happened, like a magic kicked off." "I don't think you can anticipate that with any record. It's just that magic of a song, what makes a hit, that no one can really explain, and you can't anticipate until you just perform it and it happens or it doesn't. It definitely has, we got something," both concluded. On 4 February 2015, during their late-night show performance on Jimmy Fallon, the single artwork — an illustration of Azalea and Hudson reminiscent of Grand Theft Auto video game covers — was also unveiled, with both artists sharing it with their fans on Instagram shortly after.

Hudson described being "surprised" on an interview with Billboard when she found out that Azalea wanted to collaborate on "Trouble", but saying "working with her was interesting because it was a different way to see an artist work," explaining, "She's so creative. She actually directed the video and wrote the treatments. I was like, 'hmm, maybe I need to do that'. I got to see another artist work up closely and see her creativity, which inspired my creativity as well. I don't think I've ever worked on a video with the artist being the director." During an interview with Ryan Seacrest on 24 February 2015, Azalea also revealed T.I. orchestrated her first collaboration with Hudson, "He heard that the Jennifer Hudson track, they were looking for a rapper and he was like, 'You should give Iggy a try'," referring to their team-up on the Pharrell Williams-produced "He Ain't Goin' Nowhere" off JHUD, "So I tried the verse not knowing if I would be accepted or not and she loved it and that's how I started working with Jennifer." The song was serviced to mainstream radio stations in the US on 24 February 2015 and an accompanying music video was also shot earlier that month, having premiered on 27 February 2015 through Azalea's Vevo channel.

== Critical reception ==
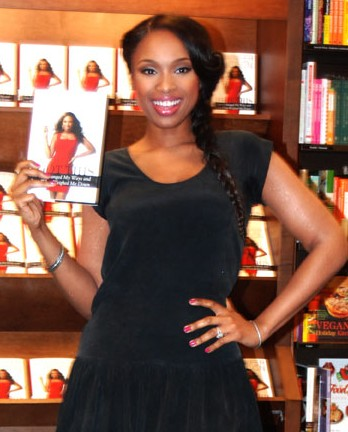
The guest appearance of Jennifer Hudson on "Trouble" was well received by critics.

"Trouble" received generally positive reviews from music critics. Jim Farber of the New York Daily News gave "Trouble" a positive mention, while reviewing Reclassified, stating that it "reaches back further", while comparing it to another album track that he describes as an "updated Giorgio Moroder-style '70s fusion-funk", "We in This Bitch", "to borrow the sprightly piano, exuberant hand claps and tart horn punctuations of a Motown '60s hit. A gutsy guest vocal from Jennifer Hudson adds to the attitude." Mark Beaumont of NME also praised Hudson's contribution pointing out that she "brings soulful sass to the piano-led song." NME named "Trouble" one of Azalea's ten best songs in a list published in 2015, writing that it "hits the sweet spot between craven soul-pop crossover and wind-the-windows-down anthem."

Rory Cashin of State was less impressed with "the piano driven throwback" commenting that it's "perfectly pleasant and jaunty – or in other words, totally forgettable." Jacques Peterson of Popdust noted the track "definitely has the potential to be bigger than "Beg for It" was; it follows the same formula as all of Iggy's hits by having a strong female vocalist serve as the hook singer, while the song's pop-soul production falls right in line with current Hot 100 chart-toppers like Meghan Trainor and Mark Ronson." A writer for Music Times also reviewed the track remarking "a throwback groove reminiscent of the Jackson 5's 'I Want You Back'," complimenting Hudson's appearance on the song as well, "The rapper delivers a firm flow throughout the performance, but the main draw is definitely Hudson. She's in prime vocal form, giving Azalea's track just the right amount of soul." Lewis Corner of Digital Spy gave it three out of five stars, calling it "inescapably catchy" with a "deliciously retro chorus that echoes the kind of classic soulful melody that could soundtrack Motown's finest."

== Commercial performance ==
"Trouble" debuted at number 75 on the Australian Singles Chart issued for 23 February 2015, moving up to number 15 the following week. It peaked at number 10 on 16 March 2015, becoming Azalea's third top ten single in Australia after "Fancy" and "Problem", and Hudson's first ever top ten entry. On 2 May 2015, "Trouble" was certified Platinum in that country.

In Canada, the song debuted at number 44 on the Hot Canadian Digital Songs dated for 13 December 2014, charting as an album track, before its single announcement the following year, due to strong digital sales during the debut week of Reclassified. It debuted at number 73 on the Canadian Hot 100 on 11 April 2015. In the United States, "Trouble" initially debuted at number 9 on Billboard's Bubbling Under R&B/Hip-Hop Singles, dated 14 March 2015. On the following week, and after the music video premiere, it appeared on the Bubbling Under Hot 100 Singles at number 14, and also at number 42 on the main Hot R&B/Hip-Hop Songs chart. Moreover, the track debuted at number 38 on the Mainstream Top 40. It debuted and peaked at number 67 on the US Billboard Hot 100, becoming Azalea's ninth charting title, also climbing to number 22 on the Hot R&B/Hip-Hop Songs and number 13 on the Hot Rap Songs charts for the week ending 11 April 2015. Digital sales of the track fueled the chart movement, logging 41,000 downloads, up 534 percent, landing a number twenty-five bow on Billboard's Digital Songs.

In the United Kingdom, "Trouble" debuted at number 185 on the UK Singles Chart issued for 8 March 2015, due to lack of streaming and despite being at number 85 on the sales-only based version of the chart. On the UK R&B Chart, the song debuted at number 35 on the same week, moving up to number 11 the following week, and number 8 for the chart issued 22 March 2015. For the chart issued 15 March 2015, the single moved up to number 81, appearing at number 52 on its singles sales version. On 22 March 2015, the track climbed to number 52, and number 32 on the UK Singles Sales Chart. The following week, it moved up yet again to number 43 on the main singles chart, after appearing at number 35 on the official midweek chart update for 1 April 2015. On 26 April 2015, the track placed at number 7 on the sales-only based chart, however due to lack of streaming and only placing at number 41 on the audio streams chart, it then placed at number 13 on the Official UK Singles Chart, becoming Azalea's seventh top 20 hit in that country. On 3 May 2015, the track set another record for Azalea, climbing to number 7 on the official chart and becoming her fifth top 10 UK single, as well as Hudson's first top 10 entry. The track also rose to number 23 on the Official Audio Streaming Chart and number 6 on the official sales-only based chart. It peaked at number two on the UK R&B Chart, spending twenty-seven weeks on the chart. On 22 May 2015, it was certified Silver by the British Phonographic Industry. "Trouble" debuted at number 76 on the weekly Irish Singles Chart for 19 March 2015, peaking at number 20 on its sixth week and spending eighteen weeks on the chart.

== Music video ==
On 20 January 2015, Azalea announced music video plans for "Trouble" and that she would be directing it with her stylist Alejandra Hernandez. Azalea and Hudson were then spotted shooting the video for the track in downtown Los Angeles during the first weekend of February 2015. In the '70s-inspired visuals seen on the candid images, Azalea, in a Farrah Fawcett-style hairdo and plunging crop top, had just smashed a red classic sports car (a 1971 Chevrolet Chevelle) into a fire hydrant as part of the cop-and-robber act, while Hudson could be seen dressed as a police officer handcuffing Azalea with both also eventually dancing together in the same street.

When asked about the concept of the video during an interview with Access Hollywood a few days later, Azalea mentioned being "very nervous" because it is her first time directing a music video, with Hudson chiming in saying Azalea's doing a "good job". Azalea continued, "It's a narrative storyline so I don't want to give too much away because I want to leave the surprise. But it's fairly evident that Jennifer is this badass sassy cop, strong boss lady, and my character is more naïve than one would think from the pictures, and I've kind of stumbled into this Bonnie and Clyde-type of situation that I'm in — thats all I'll say." During yet another interview with MTV News, Azalea also promised "a lot of car stuff," plus a beginning, middle and end similar to her previous video for the song "Black Widow". "Anytime there's a video with a strong narrative and you really get to play a character and perform that character and give the character its own quirks and things, you really get to have fun with it," she said. Hudson also hinted plans for a sequel adding, "Its definitely that type of video that you could see a part two coming about." On 7 February 2015, Azalea stated she had "just wrapped the Trouble video."

On 17 February 2015, an official lyric video premiered on Azalea's Vevo channel featuring pictures of the music video shoot.

On 27 February 2015, the official music video, with directing credits to Azalea and Director X, was released on her Vevo channel. As of January 2020, tt has received over 104 million views and 723 thousand likes on YouTube became Azalea's thirteen and Hudson's first music video to surpass 100 million views and the most-viewed from Reclassified album. In the opening scene, Azalea unknowingly assists her bad boy boyfriend in robbing a bank. However, Hudson arrests him. Once he is behind bars, Azalea devises a plan to help him escape. The lovers speed through the streets of L.A. in her getaway vehicle, while Hudson and other cops chase them. In the end, the getaway car hits a fire hydrant and Azalea is arrested by Hudson while the boyfriend is cuffed by male officers.

While talking about her experience shooting the video with Hudson, during an interview with 97.1 AMP Radio on 11 March 2015, Azalea said, "I finally met someone who can out 'sass' me. She's so sassy. I love her. We had so much fun shooting that video. It took us 3 days if you could believe. It was so good because I got to really have girl time with her. I enjoyed it. We were having such a good time together."

== Live performances and usage in media ==
On 4 February 2015, Azalea and Hudson performed the song for the first time by teaming up with The Roots on The Tonight Show Starring Jimmy Fallon. The performance received a positive reception, with an editor from The Boombox writing, "Despite it being their first live TV performance together, the onstage chemistry between the two was evident from start to finish with both vibing off of each other's movements and energy with ease. Backed by the show's in-house band, the Roots, Azalea and J-Hud owned the stage and looked stylish as ever while doing so." They performed it again at Clive Davis and The Recording Academy's annual pre-Grammy Gala at the Beverly Hilton in Beverly Hills, on 7 February 2015. On 28 March 2015, Azalea and Hudson performed "Trouble" at the 2015 Nickelodeon Kids' Choice Awards. For the performance, Azalea was dressed in a yellow jumpsuit that read "Trouble 060790," her birthdate, and emerged in handcuffs before Hudson, dressed as an officer, threw her in a yellow jail cell. Once behind bars, Iggy danced with her fellow inmates and held a poodle on a leash. Hudson taught her fellow officers a lesson on trouble before leading the rapper offstage in cuffs. They also opened the iHeartRadio Music Awards, on 29 March 2015, by performing the track: Azalea emerged from behind pink cell bars before being frisked by Officer Hudson, she then made a phone call on her pink payphone alongside male inmates and danced in her pink bathroom stall complete with an orange toilet; they capped it off by performing side by side. Azalea and Hudson performed "Trouble" again on the singing competition series American Idol on 8 April 2015.

On 26 March 2015, American actor Sean Hayes, best known for his role as Jack McFarland in the sitcom Will & Grace, and his husband, Scott Icenogle, posted a clip of them miming the song to the former's Facebook page. The lip sync clip immediately went viral, having garnered 31 million views through 1 April 2015. That, in turn, helped the track get its best digital sales week yet and debut on the Billboard Hot 100 chart the following week. On 13 April, Hudson also sang "Trouble" during a carpool karaoke skit on The Late Late Show with James Corden, with Azalea also doing her own take of the song later on the season of the same show on 18 June 2015.

== Formats and track listings ==
- Digital download – Remixes EP
1. "Trouble" (featuring Jennifer Hudson) [Kat Krazy Remix] – 3:35
2. "Trouble" (featuring Jennifer Hudson) [TC4 Remix] – 4:06
3. "Trouble" (featuring Jennifer Hudson) [Nicky Night Time Remix] – 5:25

== Credits and personnel ==
Credits adapted from Reclassified liner notes.

- Written by Iggy Azalea, Judith Hill, Isabella Summers, The Invisible Men, Saltwives, Jon Turner
- Produced by The Invisible Men and Saltwives
- All vocals by Iggy Azalea and Jennifer Hudson
- Horns by the 'Hot City Horns' - Mike Davis, Paul Burton, & Kenji Fenton
- Drums & Programming by Alex Oriet, David Phelan, Jon Shave, George Astasio
- Keyboards by Alex Oriet, David Phelan, Jon Shave, Jason Pebworth
- Guitar by Alex Oriet, David Phelan
- Vocals recorded by Daniel Zaidenstadt and Harvey Mason Jr.
- Assisted by Andrew Hey.

== Charts ==
=== Weekly charts ===
Chart (2015)	Peak position
Australia (ARIA)	10
Belgium (Ultratip Bubbling Under Flanders)	14
Belgium Urban (Ultratop Flanders)	26
Canada Hot 100 (Billboard)	73
Canada CHR/Top 40 (Billboard)	49
Euro Digital Songs (Billboard)	11
Hungary (Rádiós Top 40)	8
Hungary (Single Top 40)	39
Ireland (IRMA)	20
Scottish Singles Sales (Official Charts)	9
UK Singles (Official Charts)	7
UK Hip Hop/R&B (Official Charts)	2
US Billboard Hot 100	67
US Hot R&B/Hip-Hop Songs (Billboard)	22
US Hot Rap Songs (Billboard)	13
US Pop Airplay (Billboard)	34

=== Year-end charts ===
Chart (2015)	Position
Australia (ARIA)	84
Australian Artist Singles (ARIA)	8
Belgium Urban (Ultratop Flanders)	74
Hungary (Rádiós Top 40)	62
UK Singles (Official Charts Company)	84

== Certifications ==
Region	Certification	Certified units/sales
Australia (ARIA)	Platinum	70,000^{^}
New Zealand (RMNZ)	Gold	15,000^{‡}
United Kingdom (BPI)	Platinum	600,000^{‡}
United States (RIAA)	Gold	500,000^{‡}
^{^} Shipments figures based on certification alone.^{‡} Sales+streaming figures based on certification alone.

== Release history ==
Country	Date	Format	Label	Ref.
United States	24 February 2015	Contemporary hit radio	Def Jam	
Australia	19 April 2015	Digital download – Remixes EP	Def Jam	
United Kingdom	19 April 2015	Digital download – Remixes EP	Def Jam	
