= E-flat minor =

Minor scale based on E-flat

- Relative key: G-flat major
- Parallel key: E-flat major
- Dominant key: B-flat minor
- Subdominant key: A-flat minor
- Enharmonic key: D-sharp minor

Component pitches
- E♭, F, G♭, A♭, B♭, C♭, D♭

E-flat minor is a minor scale based on E♭, consisting of the pitches E♭, F, G♭, A♭, B♭, C♭, and D♭. Its key signature consists of six flats. Its relative key is G-flat major and its parallel key is E-flat major. Its enharmonic equivalent, D-sharp minor, contains the same number of sharps as the number of flats in E-flat minor.

The E-flat natural minor scale is:

Changes needed for the melodic and harmonic versions of the scale are written in with accidentals as necessary. The E-flat harmonic minor and melodic minor scales are:

== Scale degree chords ==
The scale degree chords of E-flat minor are:

- Tonic – E-flat minor
- Supertonic – F diminished
- Mediant – G-flat major
- Subdominant – A-flat minor
- Dominant – B-flat minor
- Submediant – C-flat major
- Subtonic – D-flat major

== Music in E-flat minor ==
In the 24 canonic keys, most of the composers preferred E-flat minor, while Johann Sebastian Bach, Sergei Lyapunov, and Manuel Ponce preferred D-sharp minor.

In Book 1 of The Well-Tempered Clavier by Bach, Prelude No. 8 is written in E-flat minor while the following fugue is written in D-sharp minor. In Book 2, both movements are in D-sharp minor.

Haydn's Piano Trio No. 41, H. XV.31 in two movements, composed in 1794/95, one of the "London Trios", is in E-flat minor.

Beethoven applied E-flat minor to the slow introduction in the sixth (last) movement of his Septet Op. 20 by adding accidentals while bearing the key signature of E-flat major (three flats). The "Introduction" to his oratorio Christ on the Mount of Olives is also in this key, but with the full six-flat signature.

The fifth of Schubert's 6 Grandes Marches, D. 819 is in this key.

The final piece in Brahms' Klavierstücke, Op. 118, No. 6, is in E-flat minor. The piece, like many pieces in this key, is dark and funereal, being based on the Dies irae chant. Schubert ended his Impromptus No. 2, D. 899, in E-flat minor, the parallel key to its opening E-flat major, and so did Brahms in his Rhapsody No. 4, Op. 119. Another impromptu by Schubert in this key is the first from D. 946. His march No. 5 from 6 Grandes marches, D. 819 is likewise in E-flat minor. Chopin wrote his Etude No.6, Op. 10, his Polonaise No. 2, Op. 26, and his Prelude No. 14, Op. 28 in E-flat minor.

Tchaikovsky's 1812 Overture is a sonata form in E-flat minor framed by an extended introduction and a long coda, both in E-flat major.

Janáček's Piano Sonata, 1. X. 1905, arguably his best-known work for the piano, is in E-flat minor.

Earlier piano sonatas in the key are the Grand Sonata, Op. 3/1 by George Pinto and the Piano Sonata by Paul Dukas.

Alkan composed the final movement for Symphony for Solo Piano in E-flat minor, as well as the final etude from his Trois morceaux dans le genre pathétique.

The slow movement from the Clarinet Sonata Op. 167 by Camille Saint-Saëns is in E-flat minor.

The Fourth Movement of Robert Schumann's 3rd Symphony is in E-flat minor.

Prokofiev's Symphony No. 6 opens in E-flat minor but does not return to this key. A few other less well-known composers also wrote symphonies in this key, such as Andrei Eshpai, Jānis Ivanovs (fourth symphony Sinfonia Atlantida, 1941), Ovchinnikov and Nikolai Myaskovsky. Aram Khachaturian wrote his Toccata in E-flat minor while studying under Myaskovsky.

E-flat minor is the key in which Shostakovich composed his fifteenth and final string quartet.

Ravel's Gaspard de la nuit, M.55, 'Le Gibet', the second movement, is in E-flat minor.

Rachmaninoff's Elegie, Op. 3, No. 1, from Cinq Morceaux de Fantaisie, is in E-flat minor, as is his Étude-Tableau, Op. 39, No. 5.

In Stravinsky's Firebird Suite, most of the Berceuse is in E-flat minor, except for the final measures that lead into the Finale.

The waltz "On the Hills of Manchuria" by Ilya Shatrov, about the loss of Russia in the Russo-Japanese War, is written in E-flat minor. As mentioned, E-flat minor is common in Russian pieces. "On the Hills of Manchuria" is perhaps the most notable example.

Guitarist Yngwie Malmsteen has composed a number of pieces in E-flat minor, including the Concerto Suite for Electric Guitar and Orchestra.

The jazz composition "Take Five" is also in this key.

== See also ==
- List of symphonies in E-flat minor

No.	Flats		Sharps	
No.	Major	minor	Major	minor
0	C	a	C	a
1	F	d	G	e
2	B♭	g	D	b
3	E♭	c	A	f♯
4	A♭	f	E	c♯
5	D♭	b♭	B	g♯
6	G♭	e♭	F♯	d♯
7	C♭	a♭	C♯	a♯
8	F♭	d♭	G♯	e♯
