= A-flat minor =

Minor scale based on A-flat

- Relative key: C-flat major
- Parallel key: A-flat major
- Dominant key: E-flat minor
- Subdominant key: D-flat minor →enharmonic: C-sharp minor
- Enharmonic key: G-sharp minor

Component pitches
- A-flat, B-flat, C-flat, D-flat, E-flat, F-flat, G-flat

A-flat minor is a minor scale based on A-flat, consisting of the pitches A-flat, B-flat, C-flat, D-flat, E-flat, F-flat, and G-flat. Its key signature has seven flats. Its relative major is C-flat major, its parallel major is A-flat major, and its enharmonic equivalent is G-sharp minor.

The A-flat natural minor scale is:

Changes needed for the melodic and harmonic versions of the scale are written in with accidentals as necessary. The A-flat harmonic minor and melodic minor scales are:

== Scale degree chords ==
The scale degree chords of A-flat minor are:

- Tonic – A-flat minor
- Supertonic – B-flat diminished
- Mediant – C-flat major
- Subdominant – D-flat minor
- Dominant – E-flat minor
- Submediant – F-flat major
- Subtonic – G-flat major

== Music in A-flat minor ==
Although A-flat minor occurs in modulation in works in other keys, it is only rarely used as the principal key of a piece of music. Some well-known uses of the key in classical and romantic music include:

- The Funeral March in Ludwig van Beethoven's Piano Sonata No. 12, Op. 26.
- An early section of the last movement of Beethoven's Piano Sonata No. 31, Op. 110 (although the key signature of this section uses only 6 flats, not 7).
- The second Trio in Franz Schubert's Klavierstücke in E-flat major for Piano, D946/2.
- Schubert's Impromptu in A-flat major actually begins in A-flat minor, though this is written as A-flat major with accidentals.
- The second movement of Ferdinand Ries' Concerto No. 2 for Piano and Orchestra in E-flat major, also written as A-flat major with accidentals.
- The first piece "Aime-moi" ("Love me") from Charles-Valentin Alkan's Trois morceaux dans le genre pathétique
- Max Bruch's Concerto for Two Pianos and Orchestra, Op. 88a, although the piece ends in A-flat major.
- The Evocación from Book I of Isaac Albéniz's Iberia.
- Isaac Albéniz's La Vega.
- Etude No.13 in Moritz Moszkowski's Études de Virtuosité, Op. 72, although it ends in A-flat major.
- Leoš Janáček uses it for his Violin Sonata and the organ solo of his Glagolitic Mass.
- The opening of Igor Stravinsky's The Firebird.
- Franz Liszt's original version of "La campanella" from Grandes études de Paganini, which was subsequently rewritten in G-sharp minor.
- In Gustav Mahler's Ninth Symphony, there is a particularly aggressive restatement of the introduction of the third movement in A-flat minor.
- The first movement of Charles Koechlin's Partita for Chamber Orchestra, Op. 205, is in A-flat minor, and the earlier A-flat-minor portion is written with a 7-flat key signature, but the later A-flat-minor portion is written without any key signature, and uses the necessary flats as accidentals.
- It is also used in Frederick Loewe's score to the 1956 musical play My Fair Lady; the Second Servants' Chorus is set in A-flat minor (the preceding and following choruses being a semitone lower and higher respectively).
- Antonín Dvořák's String Quartet No. 14, Op. 105, opens in A-flat minor.

More often, pieces in a minor mode that have A-flat's pitch as tonic are notated in the enharmonic key, G-sharp minor, because that key has just five sharps as opposed to the seven flats of A-flat minor. However, there may be cases where the A flat minor key with seven flats is preferred due to the frequent use of double sharps at the heads of notes when using the G sharp minor key with five sharps.

In some scores, the A-flat minor key signature in the bass clef is written with the flat for the F on the second line from the top. (Note: An example of this is the bass clef staff of the harp parts in the Jupiter movement of Gustav Holst's orchestral suite The Planets.)

== Notes ==
No.	Flats		Sharps	
No.	Major	minor	Major	minor
0	C	a	C	a
1	F	d	G	e
2	B♭	g	D	b
3	E♭	c	A	f♯
4	A♭	f	E	c♯
5	D♭	b♭	B	g♯
6	G♭	e♭	F♯	d♯
7	C♭	a♭	C♯	a♯
8	F♭	d♭	G♯	e♯
