= La Vega (Albéniz) =

1899 piano composition by Isaac Albéniz

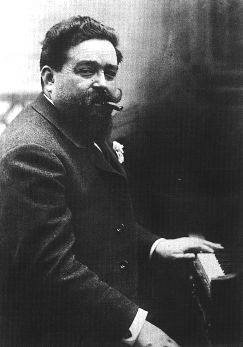
Isaac Albéniz in 1901

"La Vega" is a composition for solo piano by Isaac Albéniz. It was intended to be the second movement of a symphonic suite called Alhambra after the Arab palace in Granada, in the Andalusia region in Spain. The suite was drafted in Paris in December 1896, and consisted of six pieces:

1. Preludio
2. La Vega
3. Lindaraja
4. Generalife
5. Zambra
6. Alarme!

Albéniz completed only "La Vega" (on 26 January 1897) and the first 16 bars of "Generalife". The score was written in piano solo format, and "La Vega" was later orchestrated. The orchestral version of "La Vega" was never published however, but the composer decided to publish the piano solo version after discarding the last three pages and writing a new, more developed version of the entire piece, with a reprise of the opening "A" section taking the place of the three discarded pages. This new expanded version was completed on 14 February 1897 and published that year. The piece lasts approximately 14 minutes.

"La Vega" is an evocation of the Granada plains on the edge of the city, a "musical reflection", as the composer put it, contemplated from the Alhambra Palace. Claude Debussy, on hearing Albéniz play the piece, enthusiastically told him of his wish to immediately go and discover Granada.

A number of errors were introduced in the typesetting of the first edition of "La Vega", and it was not until 2003 that a corrected edition was published.
