= Flat (music) =

Symbol indicating one semitone lower

♭o

Flat (music)
- In Unicode: U+266D ♭ MUSIC FLAT SIGN (&flat;)

Different from
- Different from: U+0062 b LATIN SMALL LETTER B

Related
- See also: U+1D12B 𝄫 MUSICAL SYMBOL DOUBLE FLAT U+1D12C 𝄬 MUSICAL SYMBOL FLAT UP; U+1D12D 𝄭 MUSICAL SYMBOL FLAT DOWN U+1D133 𝄳 MUSICAL SYMBOL QUARTER TONE FLAT

In music, flat means lower in pitch. The flat symbol, ♭, indicates that the note to which it is applied is played one chromatic semitone lower. The opposite of flat is sharp, indicating a raising of pitch.

The flat symbol (♭) appears in key signatures to indicate which notes are flat throughout a section of music, and also in front of individual notes as an accidental, indicating that the note is flat until the next bar line.

== Pitch change ==
The symbol ♭ is a stylised lowercase b, derived from Italian be molle for "soft B" and German blatt for "planar, dull". It indicates that the note to which it is applied is played one chromatic semitone lower. In the standard modern tuning system, 12-tone equal temperament, this corresponds to 100 cents.

The difference in pitch indicated by a sharp or flat varies across different tuning systems. In tuning systems from the 16th and 17th century, and in modern microtonal tunings, the difference is normally smaller than a standard semitone. The change in pitch in the old quarter-comma meantone system would be 76.05 cents, in just intonation it would be 70.57 cents, and in Pythagorean tuning 113.7 cents. In well temperaments, the change in pitch indicated by a sharp or flat can vary.

Intricate systems of microtuning may replace the standard flat or sharp with different symbols for raising and lowering pitch. In 53 equal temperament tuning sharps and flats have two or three different sub-levels, and notation for flattening notes varies, but usually involves several different symbols; one of the sets of 53 tet flat symbols is ♭ (67.9 cents), (45.3 cents), and ↓ (22.6 cents), used both separately and in combinations.

== Related symbols ==
A double flat lowers a note by two chromatic semitones (a whole step in 12-tone equal temperament).

A quarter-tone flat, half flat or demiflat indicates the use of quarter tones; it may be marked with various symbols including a flat with a slash, a flat with a 4 (𝄳), or a reversed flat sign. A three-quarter-tone flat, flat and a half or sesquiflat is represented by a demiflat and a whole flat. The symbols -, ↓,, among others, represent comma flat or eighth-tone flat. (Note: The size of the lowering of pitch by a "comma" varies, depending on the tuning system; it is normally 21 1 / 2 cents but can vary between 20–25 cents.)

A triple flat is very rare. As expected, it lowers a note by three chromatic semitones (a whole tone and semitone in 12-tone equal temperament). (For example, B is enharmonic with A♭.)

While this system allows for higher multiples of flats, there are only a few examples of triple flats in the literature. However, quadruple flats or beyond may be required in some non-standard tuning systems such as 53 equal temperament. A quadruple flat would be indicated by the symbol.

== Flats in key signatures ==
Order of flats in key signatures
Number of flats	Major key	Flatted notes	Minor key
0	C major	— none —	A minor
1	F major	B♭	D minor
2	B♭ major	B♭, E♭	G minor
3	E♭ major	B♭, E♭, A♭	C minor
4	A♭ major	B♭, E♭, A♭, D♭	F minor
5	D♭ major	B♭, E♭, A♭, D♭, G♭	B♭ minor
6	G♭ major	B♭, E♭, A♭, D♭, G♭, C♭	E♭ minor
7	C♭ major^{†}	B♭, E♭, A♭, D♭, G♭, C♭, F♭	A♭ minor

^† In the standard tuning system (12 equal temperament), the key of C♭ major, with 7 flats, is enharmonically equivalent with B major, which only requires 5 sharps, so it is almost always notated as such.

The order of flats in key signatures (B♭, E♭, A♭, D♭, G♭, C♭, F♭) and the corresponding order of keys (F, B♭, E♭, A♭, D♭, G♭, C♭) both follow the circle of fifths sequence. Some keys (such as C♭ major with seven flats) may be written as an enharmonically equivalent key (B major with five sharps in this case). Flat keys can theoretically be extended further, requiring double flats (F♭ → B → E → A → D → G → C) but these are impractical and very rarely used. This principle applies similarly to the sharp keys.

The staff below shows a key signature with three flats (E♭ major or its relative minor C minor), followed by a note with a flat preceding it: The flat symbol placed on the note indicates that it is a D♭.

In standard 12 tone equal temperament tuning, lowering a note's pitch by a semitone results in a note that is enharmonically equivalent to the adjacent named note. In this system, B♭ and A♯ are considered to be equivalent. In other, non-standard tuning systems, however, this is not the case.

== Accidentals ==
Accidentals are placed to the left of the note head.

They apply to the note on which they are placed and to subsequent similar notes in the same measure and octave. In modern notation they do not apply to notes in other octaves, but this was not always the convention. To cancel an accidental later in the same measure and octave, another accidental such as a natural (♮) or a sharp (♯) may be used.

== Other notation and usage ==
- Historically, raising a double flat to a single flat could be notated using a natural sign and a flat sign (♮♭) or vice-versa (♭♮). Modern notation often simply uses a single flat. The combination ♮♭ can be used when changing a sharp to a flat.
- In environments where the symbol is not supported, or in specific text notation, a double flat can be written with two single flat signs (♭♭), two lower-case b's (bb), etc. Likewise, a triple flat can also be written as ♭♭♭, etc.
- In environments where the or 𝄳 symbol is not supported, or in specific text notation, a half flat can be written as a lower-case d. Likewise, a flat and a half can be written as d♭ or db.
- To allow extended just intonation, composer Ben Johnston uses a flat as an accidental to indicate a note is lowered 70.6 cents.

== Unicode ==
The Unicode character ♭ (U+266D) can be found in the block Miscellaneous Symbols; its HTML entity is &#9837;. Other assigned flat signs can be found in the Musical Symbols block and are as follows:

- U+1D12B 𝄫 MUSICAL SYMBOL DOUBLE FLAT
- U+1D12C 𝄬 MUSICAL SYMBOL FLAT UP
- U+1D12D 𝄭 MUSICAL SYMBOL FLAT DOWN
- U+1D133 𝄳 MUSICAL SYMBOL QUARTER TONE FLAT

== See also ==
- Electronic tuner – Device used to tune musical instruments
