= Iggy SZN =

Promotional single by Iggy Azalea

from the album Reclassified
- Released: 24 October 2014
- Studio: Sarm West Coast (London, England); British Grove Studios (London, England)
- Genre: Hip hop
- Length: 3:20
- Label: Virgin EMI
- Songwriters: Iggy Azalea; The Invisible Men; Jon Mills; Darryl Reid; Jon Turner
- Producers: The Invisible Men; The Arcade

"Iggy SZN" (also known as "Iggy Szn") is a song by Australian rapper Iggy Azalea, taken from her reissue for her debut studio album, Reclassified (2014). The song was produced by The Invisible Men and The Arcade, and was written by Azalea and the Invisible Men, alongside Jon Millis, Darryl Reid, and Jon Turner. The song was recorded at Sarm West Coast and British Grove Studios in London, England. "Iggy SZN" is a hip-hop song built on electro handclap based beats and synthesisers. On the 23rd of October, the song was made available for streaming. A day later, the track was available as an instant track upon pre-ordering the album via iTunes stores.

"Iggy SZN" would later be released on Reclassified on the 21st of November, 2014, through Virgin EMI Records, as the 9th track and sole promotional single from the album. The song gained mixed critical reception and peaked at number ninety-five and eleven on the Australian Singles Chart and the Australian Urban Chart respectively, the latter being the song's highest peak on any chart it reached. In the United States of America, the track charted at number forty-eight on the Hot R&B/Hip-Hop Songs chart, and in Canada, the song reached number sixty-three on the Billboard Hot Canadian Digital Singles chart.

== Background and composition ==
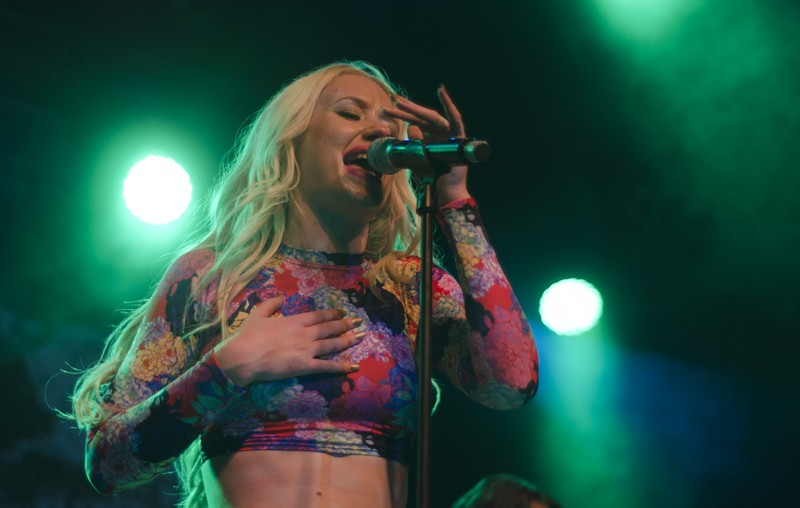
Azalea talks about her success in the song.

On 4 September 2014, Azalea announced that she would be reissuing her debut studio album The New Classic. On October 19, 2014, the track list of Reclassified was released, which also included "Iggy SZN" as 9th track. On 23 October 2014, the track was available for streaming. A day later, the track was made available as an instant digital download track upon pre-ordering Reclassified via iTunes Stores. "Iggy SZN" was written by Iggy Azalea, The Invisible Men, Jon Mills, Darryl Reid and Jon Turner. It was produced by The Invisible Men and The Arcade. Lasting for a duration of 3:20 (three minutes and twenty seconds), "Iggy SZN" is built on "club-ready" electro handclap-based beats and heavy synthesisers. Lyrically, Azalea talks about her success and goes after her "haters" on the song. At one point, she raps: "Haters gon' hate while critics critique, I pay them no mind whenever they speak / what they make a year I make in a week, I know you can't stand it, just get you a seat!" On the hook, she raps: "Everywhere I go they say it's Iggy SZN / Until l get what I want, I ain't leaving… Simmer down bitch / It's Iggy SZN."

== Reception ==
"Iggy SZN" received mixed reception from music critics. An editor from the website Music Times compared the minimal production on the track to that of Azalea's previous single "Fancy" featuring Charli XCX (2014), writing that "It's not quite as catchy as 'Fancy,' but it is still a lot of fun." Brennan Carley of Spin opined that the background on "Iggy SZN" was similar to works done by Diplo. He further shared that, "she'll need to do a little better than 'Iggy SZN' if she wants to keep anyone's interest." Jim Farber of the New York Daily News commented "the star doubles down on her love of 'fancy' (read: gimmicky) hooks, pitting a shrill beat, a lion's roar and a nagging synth against one another for attention." Rory Cashin of State added that the song is "built on hand claps and a deep electronic buzz, which will sound great in a high tempo Zumba class." David Jeffries of AllMusic also complimented "Iggy SZN" stating that it "is wonderful schoolyard silliness and helps to add some charm to Iggy's ice-queen persona".

The track entered and peaked on the Australian Singles Chart at number ninety-five. It additionally charted at number eleven on the ARIA Urban Charts. Following the premiere of the song in the United States, "Iggy SZN" debuted at number thirty-seven on the weekly Billboard Twitter Top Tracks chart. It also charted at number nineteen on the Rap Digital Songs chart and twenty-four on the R&B/Hip-Hop Digital Songs after the song being unlocked on the Reclassified album pre-order, resulting in a number forty-eight debut on the Hot R&B/Hip-Hop Songs chart dated 29 November 2014. Moreover, the track debuted at number sixty-three on the Hot Canadian Digital Songs.

== Live performances ==
On December 4, 2014, Azalea performed "Iggy SZN" at the Yahoo! On the Road concert. She also performed the song during the Jingle Ball Tour on December 8, 2014.

== Credits and personnel ==
Credits adapted from Reclassified liner notes.

Locations

- Recorded at: Sarm West Coast and Grove Studios, London
- Mixed at: The Mix Spot, Los Angeles

Personnel

- Songwriting – Iggy Azalea, The Invisible Men, Darryl Reid, Jon Turner
- Production – The Invisible Men, Darryl Reid
- Vocals – Iggy Azalea
- Drums and programming – Darryl Reid, Jon Shave, George Astasio
- Keyboards – Darryl Reid, Jon Shave, Jason Pebworth
- Mixing – Anthony Kilhoffer
- Mixing assistance – Kyle Ross and Matt Anthony

== Charts ==
Chart (2014)	Peak position
Australia (ARIA)	95
Australia Urban (ARIA)	11
Hot Canadian Digital Songs (Billboard)	63
US Hot R&B/Hip-Hop Songs (Billboard)	48
