= Ilya Shatrov =

Russian composer (1879 or 1885 – 1952)

Ilya Alekseevich Shatrov
- Илья (Илий) Алексеевич Шатров
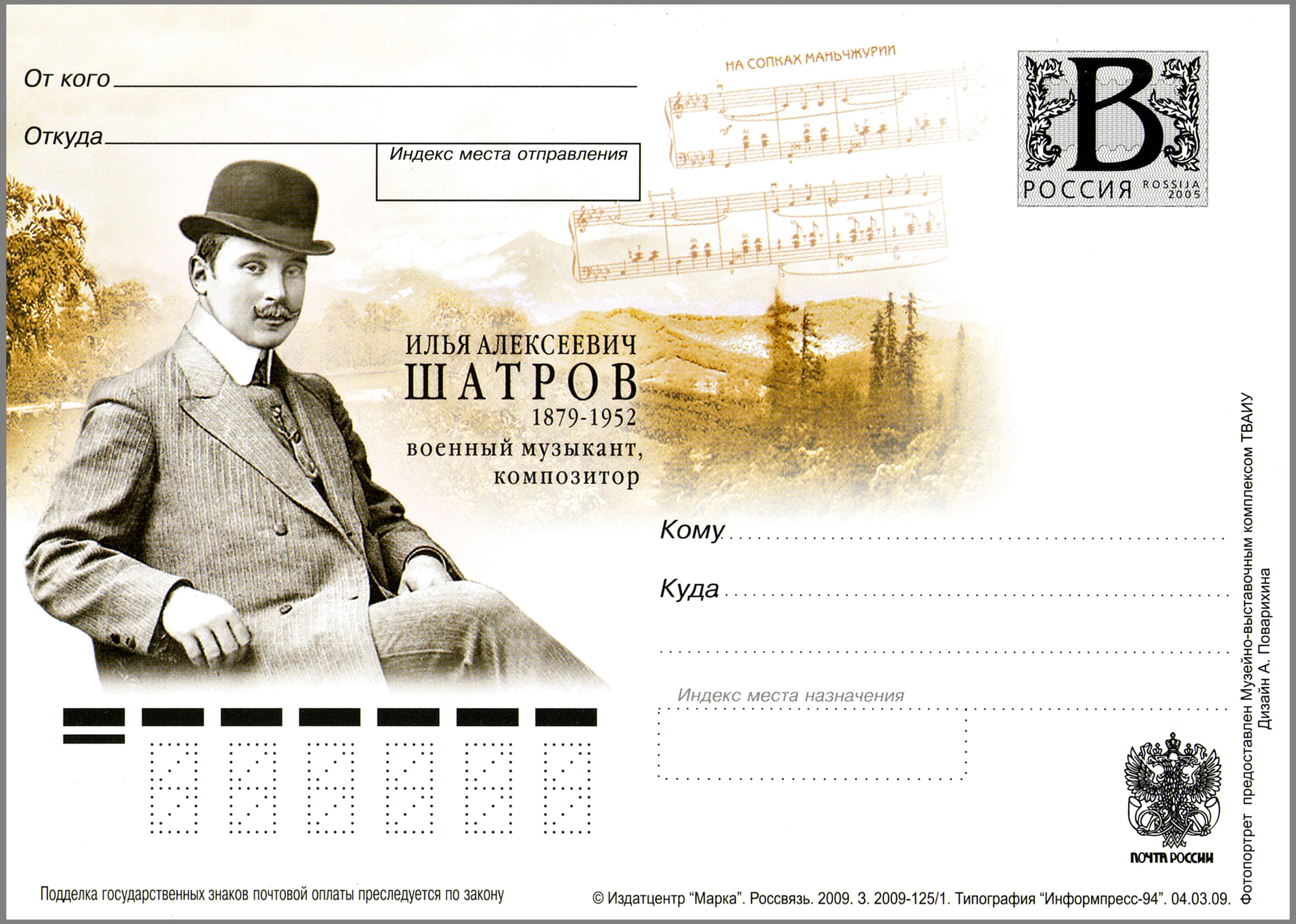
- Postcard issued for the 130th anniversary of Shatrov's birth
- Born: April 1, 1879 (or 1885); Zemlyansk, Semilukskiy, Voronezh Oblast, Russian Empire
- Died: May 2, 1952; Tambov, RSFSR, Soviet Union
- Burial place: Vozdvizhensky Cemetery
- Military career
- Allegiance: Russian Empire
- Branch: Russian Imperial Army
- Rank: Kapellmeister
- Unit: Mokshansky Regimental Orchestra (214th Reserve Mokshan Infantry Regiment)
- Conflicts: Russo-Japanese War; Battle of Liaoyang; Battle of Mukden
- Awards: Order of Saint Stanislaus (3rd class with swords); Order of St. George

Ilya Alekseevich Shatrov (Russian: Илья Алексеевич Шатров; April 1, 1879 (or 1885) – May 2, 1952) was a Russian military musician, conductor and composer. He is known for composing the waltz On the Hills of Manchuria in 1906. The waltz recounts his experiences at the Battle of Mukden during the Russo-Japanese War, and he dedicated it to one of his comrades who was killed in the battle.

== Biography ==
Shatrov was born in Zemlyansk, Semilukskiy, Voronezh Oblast, Russia, on 1 April 1879 to Aleksei Mikhailovich Shatrov, a retired non-commissioned officer of the Lithuanian Life Guards Regiment of the Russian Imperial Guard.

In 1905, Shatrov became the bandmaster of the Mokshansky Regimental Orchestra and served in the Russo-Japanese War. In February 1905, the 214th Reserve Mokshan Infantry Regiment took part in the Battle of Mukden and Liaoyang. In one of the battles the regiment was surrounded by the Japanese and was constantly attacked by the enemy. At a critical moment, when the ammunition was already spent, the regiment commander Colonel Pavel Pobyvanets gave the order: "The banner and the orchestra will go ahead!" Kapellmeister Shatrov led the orchestra to the parapet of the trenches, gave the order to play a battle march and led the orchestra ahead of the regiment's banner. Encouraged soldiers rushed into the bayonet attack. During the battle, the regiment, with the music of the orchestra, continuously attacked the Japanese and, in the end, broke through the encirclement. In the course of the battle the regiment commander perished, and of the original 4000 members of the regiment only 700 people, including 7 musicians of the orchestra, were left alive. For this feat, all the survivor musicians of the orchestra were awarded with crosses of St. George, Shatrov - an officer order of Saint Stanislav 3rd class with swords (the second such awarding of the conductors), and the orchestra was awarded silver pipes.

He died in Tambov on 2 May 1952.

== Works ==
- On the Hills of Manchuria
- It's Raining
