= G-flat major =

Major scale based on G♭

- Relative key: E-flat minor
- Parallel key: G-flat minor →enharmonic: F-sharp minor
- Dominant key: D-flat major
- Subdominant key: C-flat major
- Enharmonic key: F-sharp major

Component pitches
- G♭, A♭, B♭, C♭, D♭, E♭, F

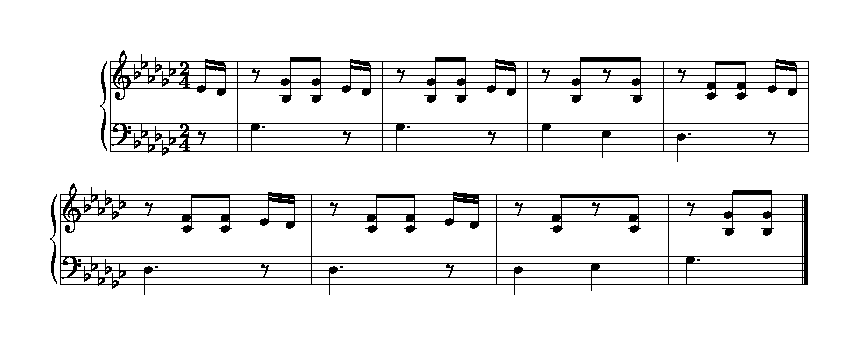
Flohwalzer in G Flat Major

G-flat major is a major scale based on G♭, consisting of the pitches G♭, A♭, B♭, C♭, D♭, E♭, and F. Its key signature has six flats.

Its relative minor is E-flat minor. Its parallel minor, G-flat minor, is usually rewritten as F-sharp minor, since G-flat minor's two double-flats make it generally impractical to use. Its enharmonic equivalent, F-sharp major, contains the same number of sharps as the number of flats in G-flat major.

The G-flat major scale is:

Changes needed for the melodic and harmonic versions of the scale are written in with accidentals as necessary. The G-flat harmonic major and melodic major scales are:

== Scale degree chords ==
The scale degree chords of G-flat major are:

- Tonic – G-flat major
- Supertonic – A-flat minor
- Mediant – B-flat minor
- Subdominant – C-flat major
- Dominant – D-flat major
- Submediant – E-flat minor
- Leading tone – F diminished

== Characteristics ==
Like F-sharp major, G-flat major is rarely chosen as the main key for orchestral works. It is more often used as a main key for piano works, such as the impromptus of Chopin and Schubert. It is the predominant key of Maurice Ravel's Introduction and Allegro for harp, flute, clarinet and string quartet, and is also used in the second movement "Le Gibet" of Ravel's famous Gaspard de la nuit.

A striking use of G-flat major can be found in the love duet "Tu l'as dit" that concludes the fourth act of Giacomo Meyerbeer's opera Les Huguenots.

When writing works in all 24 major and minor keys, Alkan, Rachmaninoff, Scriabin, Shchedrin and Winding used G-flat major over F-sharp major. Muzio Clementi chose F-sharp in his set for the prelude, but G-flat for the final "Grande Exercice" which modulates through all the keys.

Antonín Dvořák composed Humoresque No. 7 in G-flat major, while its middle section is in the parallel key (F-sharp minor, enharmonic equivalent to the theoretical G-flat minor).

Gustav Mahler was fond of using G-flat major in key passages of his symphonies. Examples include: the choral entry during the finale of his Second Symphony, during the first movement of his Third Symphony, the modulatory section of the Adagietto from his Fifth Symphony, and during the Rondo–Finale of his Seventh Symphony. Mahler's Tenth Symphony was composed in the enharmonic key of F-sharp major.

This key is more often found in piano music, as the use of all five black keys allows an easier conformity to the player's hands, despite the numerous flats. In particular, the black keys G♭, A♭, B♭, D♭, and E♭ correspond to the 5 notes of the G-flat pentatonic scale. Austrian composer Franz Schubert chose this key for his third impromptu from his first collection of impromptus (1827). Polish composer Frédéric Chopin wrote two études in the key of G-flat major: Étude Op. 10, No. 5 "Black Key" and Étude Op. 25, No. 9 "Butterfly" as well as a waltz in Op. 70. French composer Claude Debussy used this key for one of his most popular compositions, La fille aux cheveux de lin, the eighth prélude from his Préludes, Book I (1909–1910). The Flohwalzer can be played in G-flat major, or F-sharp major, for its easy fingering.

John Rutter has chosen G-flat major for a number of his compositions, including "Mary's Lullaby" and "What sweeter music". In a charity interview he explained several of the reasons that drew him to this key. In many soprano voices there is a break round about E (a tenth above middle C) with the result that it is not their best note, bypassed in the key of G-flat major. It is thus, he claims, a very vocal key. Additionally, writing for strings, there are no open strings in this key, so that vibrato can be used on any note, making it a warm and expressive key. He also cites its facility on a piano keyboard.

No.	Flats		Sharps	
No.	Major	minor	Major	minor
0	C	a	C	a
1	F	d	G	e
2	B♭	g	D	b
3	E♭	c	A	f♯
4	A♭	f	E	c♯
5	D♭	b♭	B	g♯
6	G♭	e♭	F♯	d♯
7	C♭	a♭	C♯	a♯
8	F♭	d♭	G♯	e♯
