= C-flat major =

Major scale based on C-flat

- Relative key: A-flat minor
- Parallel key: C-flat minor →enharmonic: B minor
- Dominant key: G-flat major
- Subdominant key: F-flat major →enharmonic: E major
- Enharmonic key: B major

Component pitches
- C♭, D♭, E♭, F♭, G♭, A♭, B♭

C-flat major is a major scale based on C♭, consisting of the pitches C♭, D♭, E♭, F♭, G♭, A♭, and B♭. Its key signature has seven flats. Its relative minor is A-flat minor (or enharmonically G-sharp minor). Its parallel minor, C-flat minor, is usually rewritten as B minor, since C-flat minor's three double-flats make it impractical to use. The direct enharmonic equivalent of C-flat major is B major, a key signature with five sharps.

The C-flat major scale is:

Changes needed for the melodic and harmonic versions of the scale are written in with accidentals as necessary. The C-flat harmonic major and melodic major scales are:

C-flat major is the only major or minor key, other than theoretical keys, which has "flat" or "sharp" in its name, but whose tonic note is the enharmonic equivalent of a natural note, B (a white key on a keyboard instrument).

== Scale degree chords ==
The scale degree chords of C-flat major are:

- Tonic – C-flat major
- Supertonic – D-flat minor
- Mediant – E-flat minor
- Subdominant – F-flat major
- Dominant – G-flat major
- Submediant – A-flat minor
- Leading-tone – B-flat diminished

== Use in harp music ==
C-flat major is the home key of the harp, with all its pedals in the top position, and it is considered the most resonant key for the instrument. Thus, in Richard Strauss's Ein Heldenleben, the first cue for the harps is written in C-flat major even though the rest of the orchestra, having previously played in E-flat major, retains a 3-flat key signature and is now playing in B major, marked with the necessary sharps and naturals as accidentals.

This use of C-flat major in harp parts when the rest of the orchestra is playing in B major is not exceptional: it is standard practice in orchestral music written in B major for harp parts to be notated in C-flat major. In Arnold Bax's symphonic poem Tintagel, the key is B major and again the harp part is always notated in C-flat major; but in this case the harp's key signature contains only 6 flats, and the necessary F♭s are notated with accidentals. In Claude Debussy's Sonata for Flute, Viola and Harp, the second movement has a middle section in B major, for which the harp part is notated in C-flat major with seven flats. In Reinhold Glière's Harp Concerto in E-flat major, the middle movement is a set of variations in C-flat major. Sometimes harp parts are also written in G-flat major when the rest of the orchestra is notated in F-sharp major. Harp parts can also be written in A-flat minor when the rest of the orchestra is notated in G-sharp minor.

== Music in C-flat major ==
Most composers prefer to use the enharmonic equivalent B major, since it only contains five sharps as opposed to C-flat major's seven flats. However, the middle section of Frédéric Chopin's Contredanse in G-flat major is written in C-flat major, as are the middle (Trio) sections of two of Ernesto Nazareth's Brazilian tangos for piano, "Chave de Ouro" and "Labirinto" (both with a home key of G-flat major), as well as the final half (last two themes) of William Bolcom's rag for piano, "Seabiscuits".

There is a brief passage in the first movement, "Evocación", of Iberia by Isaac Albéniz which suggests the key of C-flat minor by adding the necessary three double-flats as accidentals. The surrounding passages are in C-flat major, with a 7-flat key signature. The movement is in sonata form, in the key of A-flat minor, so this places the second theme in the orthodox relative major key (and in the also-orthodox tonic major key of A-flat major when it reappears near the end of the piece).

The slow movement of Ludwig van Beethoven's Piano Sonata No. 12 has a principal theme that modulates from A-flat minor to C-flat major, before moving to what would theoretically be C-flat minor, but is notated as B minor (every note in this passage requires an accidental, due to the key signature of seven flats). A few other works by Beethoven have significant passages in C-flat major, although they usually notate this with accidentals in some other key signature, because C-flat major's seven flats make it a difficult key to use; for example:

- Symphony No. 9 in D minor, Op. 125 (Choral), mvmt. III: the section containing a prominent horn solo before the final return of a variant of the first theme, back in B-flat major
- Piano Sonata No. 26 in E-flat major, Op. 81a (Les Adieux): several bars into the slow introduction to the first movement
- Piano Sonata No. 31 in A-flat major, Op. 110, mvmt. III: the first appearance of the Arioso section is in A-flat minor (despite being notated with only 6, not 7, flats), and this includes a significant modulation to its relative major key of C-flat major
- Piano Concerto No. 5 in E-flat major, Op. 73 (Emperor): one of the transitional themes in the first movement's exposition section, between the first and second subjects.

C-flat major is used for Benjamin Britten's Interlude in C-flat major for harp, several of Max Reger's Canons in All Major and Minor Keys (Book 1 Nos. 62 and 63, and Book 2 No. 48), and No. 29 from the Thirty Preludes in All Major and Minor Keys by Christian Heinrich Rinck.

In some scores, the C-flat major key signature in the bass clef is written with the flat for the F on the second line from the top. This can be seen, for example, in the Albéniz example given above: Iberia, 1st movement: "Evocación", about two-thirds of which is in 7 flats, and every bass-clef staff of which shows this variant. This is also seen in the second movement of the Beautiful Danube waltz in the Boosey & Hawkes concert band edition.

No.	Flats		Sharps	
No.	Major	minor	Major	minor
0	C	a	C	a
1	F	d	G	e
2	B♭	g	D	b
3	E♭	c	A	f♯
4	A♭	f	E	c♯
5	D♭	b♭	B	g♯
6	G♭	e♭	F♯	d♯
7	C♭	a♭	C♯	a♯
8	F♭	d♭	G♯	e♯
