= Kurtis McKenzie =

British record producer

- Also known as: The Arcade
- Born: United Kingdom
- Genres: Pop, hip hop
- Occupations: Record producer, songwriter
- Years active: 2011–present

Kurtis McKenzie, formally known as The Arcade, is a British record producer and songwriter based in Los Angeles. He co-produced and co-wrote Iggy Azalea's single "Fancy" featuring Charli XCX, which has sold 13 million copies worldwide, including 7 million in the U.S.

As a producer and songwriter, McKenzie has worked with various artists including Childish Gambino, Kendrick Lamar, Migos, Khalid, Maroon 5, Selena Gomez, Charli XCX, G-Eazy, Doja Cat, Snoh Aalegra, Mark Ronson, Jidenna and many more.

== Career ==
McKenzie began his career producing in his native England, working alongside a number of British artists. In 2011, he worked on the Taio Cruz single, Best Girl. The song was from the UK-singer's first album, which peaked at 14th position in the UK Album Charts. During the same year, McKenzie worked with Girls Aloud-member Nicola Roberts while she was working on her first solo album. Cinderella's Eyes was released in September 2011 and included the track, Take A Bite, which was produced and written by McKenzie. The album itself reached 17th position in the UK Album Charts.

In 2013, McKenzie worked on a number of tracks for Conor Maynard's debut album and was listed as one of the main producers for the album. Maynard's success began in 2012 when McKenzie wrote and produced Maynard's first single, Can't Say No. The song was an instant success and reached number 2 in the UK singles chart. It also received a silver certification. Maynard and McKenzie then collaborated on a second single together, Vegas Girl. The single was again successful, reaching number 4 in the singles chart in the UK. It also had success in other countries, making the top 10 in Belgium and peaking at 11th on the US Bubbling Under Hot 100 Singles chart. The first two singles were followed that up with the album Contrast, which McKenzie help produce. It went straight to number one in the UK Album Charts. The album also went onto receive a silver certification in the UK for the album sales. McKenzie wrote and produced another track on the album, Take Off. The third and final single for McKenzie produced and wrote from the album was Animal, which reached 6th position in the UK album chart.

McKenzie worked with a number of artists throughout 2014, including Rita Ora, Katy B and Iggy Azalea. He produced and wrote the Katy B track, Next Thing. The song appeared on her album Little Red, which reached number one in the UK album charts. McKenzie then teamed up with Australian recording artist, Iggy Azalea. Her debut album was released in 2014, after she had success with a number of singles. McKenzie produced and wrote six of the tracks from the album, while also receiving production and writing credits for the album itself, The New Classic. One of the six tracks written and produced by McKenzie was Fancy, which went onto become a huge global hit. It reached number 1 in four countries and throughout 2014 was one of the best selling songs of the year. It was number one on the US Hot Rap Songs end of year chart. The tracks success meant it received numerous accolades and awards, going platinum in eight countries. The New Classic also received a number of awards, winning both Favorite Rap/Hip-Hop Album at the American Music Awards and Breakthrough Artist Release at the ARIA Music Awards.

Later in 2014, he worked on Rita Ora's track for the film, Beyond the Lights. Ora's track was titled Grateful and appeared on the official soundtrack. Due to the film's success, the track received praise in the music and film industry and was nominated for three separate awards. It was nominated for Best Original Song Written Directly for a Film at the 15th World Soundtrack Awards, nominated for Best Original Song at the 87th Academy Awards and nominated for Best Original or Adapted Song at the 15th Black Reel Awards.

McKenzie teamed up with rappers Jidenna and Kendrick Lamar in 2015 to produce the track, "Classic Man". The song reached 2nd position on the US Rhythmic chart. During the same year, he also worked with Little Mix on their album, Get Weird and the track, "OMG". The album had huge commercial success in the United Kingdom, going double-platinum. McKenzie finished the year collaborating with G-Eazy on his album track, "Calm Down". When It's Dark Out reached number 1 on the US Top R&B/Hip-Hop Albums chart.

In 2016, McKenzie followed up his successes of the previous year by working on two notable tracks. The major release of the year was Maroon 5's "Don't Wanna Know", which featured Kendrick Lamar. The track was from Maroon 5's Red Pill Blues album and reached the top ten in 15 countries, including number six in the United States. Its global success meant that it went platinum in eight countries. McKenzie also produced and wrote on his first collaboration with Chris Brown on the track, What Would You Do. The track was unconnected to any of his albums as a standalone track, but was notably released 3 days after he was released following charges of gun possession.

McKenzie teamed up with a number of upcoming artists in 2017, while also working with established artists such as Khaled and Shakira. He also continued his relationship with Maroon 5, working on the production for their 2017 album, Red Pill Blues. McKenzie worked on a handful of singles for UK-based Bipolar Sunshine, the upcoming Swedish singer Léon and Snoh Aalegra. McKenzie also worked on two tracks for Kiiara, one of which was the track, Whippin. The track failed to receive any major chart success in the US, but reached 6th on the New Zealand chart and entered the top 20 in The Netherlands.

During 2017, he also teamed up with Shakira for her album, El Dorado. McKenzie worked on the songwriting and production for the album and also the track, When A Woman. The album was well received in the Billboard Top Latin Albums, reaching 1st position. It was also number one on a number of album charts including, Switzerland. It featured in the top 10 in thirteen countries in total. Its global success led the album to be nominated for a number of album awards. The album was nominated for seven awards at various music award ceremonies. It was nominated in two categories at the Latin American Music Awards, in the Album of the Year and Favorite Album Pop/Rock categories. At the Latin Grammy Awards it was nominated for Album of the Year and won its first award in the Best Contemporary Pop Vocal Album category. It was McKenzie's first award at the Latin Grammys.

In 2018, the awards and nominations continued for El Dorado. Shakira, McKenzie and the rest of the production team won Best Latin Pop Album at the Grammy Awards. The album has also been nominated for Top Latin Album of the Year and Latin Pop Album of the Year at the Latin Billboard Music Awards. McKenzie also worked on the Black Panther soundtrack, collaborating with Kendrick Lamar as a producer and writer on the track, Redemption. He also worked on the track for Migos, "Gang Gang", which appeared on Culture II.

== Discography ==
=== Singles/Albums ===
Year	Artist	Title	Album / EP	Songwriter	Producer
2011	Nicola Roberts	Take A Bite	Cinderella's Eyes	X	X
2011	Taio Cruz	Best Girl	Rokstarr	X	X
2013	Conor Maynard	Animal (feat Wiley)	Contrast	X	X
2013	Conor Maynard	Can't Say No	Contrast	X	X
2013	Conor Maynard	Take Off	Contrast	X	X
2013	Conor Maynard	Better Than You (feat. Rita Ora)	Contrast	X	X
2014	Rita Ora	Grateful	Beyond the Lights (soundtrack)		X
2014	Iggy Azalea	Beg for It (feat. MØ)	Reclassified	X	X
2014	Iggy Azalea	Fancy (feat. Charli XCX)	The New Classic	X	X
2014	Iggy Azalea	Impossible Is Nothing	The New Classic	X	X
2014	Iggy Azalea	Goddess	The New Classic	X	X
2014	Iggy Azalea	Walk The Line	The New Classic	X	X
2014	Iggy Azalea	Don't Need Y'all	The New Classic	X	X
2014	Iggy Azalea	Lady Patra	The New Classic	X	X
2014	Iggy Azalea	F Love	The New Classic	X	X
2014	Iggy Azalea	Rolex	The New Classic	X	X
2014	Katy B	Next Thing	Little Red	X	X
2015	G-Eazy	Calm Down	When It's Dark Out	X	X
2015	Little Mix	OMG	Get Weird	X	
2015	Jidenna	Classic Man (feat. Kendrick Lamar)	Wondaland Presents: The Eephus	X	
2016	Chris Brown	What Would You Do	Non-Album Single	X	X
2016	Maroon 5	Don't Wanna Know (feat. Kendrick Lamar)	Red Pill Blues	X	X
2017	Snoh Aalegra	You Got Me	Feels	X	X
2017	Shakira	When A Woman	El Dorado	X	X
2017	Léon	Surround Me	Surround Me EP	X	X
2017	Bipolar Sunshine	Major Love	Non-Album Single	X	X
2017	Bipolar Sunshine	Are You Happy	Non-Album Single	X	X
2017	Kiiara	Wishlist	Non-Album Single	X	X
2017	Kiiara	Whippin	Non-Album Single	X	X
2017	Khalid	Cold Blooded	American Teen	X	X
2017	Maroon 5	Don't Wanna Know	Red Pill Blues	X	X
2018	Kendrick Lamar	Redemption	Black Panther (soundtrack)	X	X
2018	Migos	Gang Gang	Culture II	X	X
2019	Doja Cat	Tia Tamera	Amala	X	X
2019	Doja Cat	Won't Bite Ft. Smino	Hot Pink	X	X
2019	Doja Cat	Talk Dirty	Hot Pink	X	X
2019	G-Eazy Ft. Ty Dolla Sign	All Facts	B-Sides	X	X
2019	GoldLink Ft. Pusha T	Cokewhite	Diaspora		X
2019	Khalid	Bad Luck	Free Spirit	X	X
2019	Wale (rapper)	Debbie	Wow... That's Crazy		X
2020	Selena Gomez	Feel Me	Rare (Vinyl Edition Bonus Track)	X	X
2020	Childish Gambino	Algorhythm	3.15.20	X	X
2020	Childish Gambino	12.38	3.15.20		X
2020	Childish Gambino	19.10	3.15.20	X	X
2020	Childish Gambino	32.22	3.15.20	X	X

=== Certifications ===
Year	Artist	Title	Album/Single	Certification
2013	Conor Maynard	Contrast	Album	Silver (United Kingdom)
2013	Conor Maynard	Can't Say No	Single	Silver (United Kingdom)
2015	Iggy Azalea	The New Classic	Album	Platinum (Brazil, Colombia, United States), Gold (Australia, Canada), Silver (United Kingdom)
2015	Iggy Azalea	Fancy	Single	7× Platinum (United States), 4× Platinum (Australia, Canada), Platinum x2 (Sweden), Platinum (Italy, New Zealand, United Kingdom), Gold (Spain)
2015	Jidenna feat. Kendrick Lamar	Classic Man	Single	Platinum (United States)
2016	Maroon 5 featuring Kendrick Lamar	Don't Wanna Know	Single	3× Platinum (Italy), 2× Platinum (United States, Brazil), Platinum (Australia, Denmark, New Zealand, Spain, United Kingdom), Gold (Belgium, France, Germany, Sweden)
2017	Maroon 5	Red Pill Blues	Album	Gold (Canada, United States, Sweden)
2017	Shakira	El Dorado	Album	Platinum (Colombia), Gold (France, Poland)

=== Awards ===
Year	Album/Single	Award	Category	Result
2014	Iggy Azalea – The New Classic (Album)	American Music Awards	Favorite Rap/Hip-Hop Album	Won
2014	Iggy Azalea – The New Classic (Album)	ARIA Music Awards	Breakthrough Artist Release	Won
2014	Iggy Azalea – The New Classic (Album)	ARIA Music Awards	Best Urban Album	Nominated
2015	Rita Ora – Grateful (Single)	87th Academy Awards	Best Original Song	Nominated
2015	Rita Ora – Grateful (Single)	15th Black Reel Awards	Best Original or Adapted Song	Nominated
2015	Rita Ora – Grateful (Single)	15th World Soundtrack Awards	Best Original Song Written Directly for a Film	Nominated
2015	Iggy Azalea – The New Classic (Album)	Grammy Awards	Best Rap Album	Nominated
2015	Iggy Azalea – The New Classic (Album)	Billboard Music Awards	Top Rap Album	Nominated
2017	Shakira – El Dorado (Album)	Latin American Music Awards	Album of the Year	Nominated
2017	Shakira – El Dorado (Album)	Latin American Music Awards	Favorite Album Pop/Rock	Nominated
2017	Shakira – El Dorado (Album)	Latin Grammys	Album of the Year	Nominated
2017	Shakira – El Dorado (Album)	Latin Grammys	Best Contemporary Pop Vocal Album	Won
2018	Shakira – El Dorado (Album)	Grammy Awards	Best Latin Pop Album	Won
2018	Shakira – El Dorado (Album)	Latin Billboard Music Awards	Top Latin Album of the Year	Pending
2018	Shakira – El Dorado (Album)	Latin Billboard Music Awards	Latin Pop Album of the Year	Pending
