= Whenever, Wherever =

2001 single by Shakira

"Whenever, Wherever" / "Suerte"

Single by Shakira

from the album Laundry Service
- Released: 27 August 2001
- Studio: Criteria (Miami); Compass Point (Nassau)
- Genre: Worldbeat; Latin pop; pop rock
- Length: 3:16
- Label: Epic
- Composers: Shakira; Tim Mitchell
- Lyricists: Shakira; Gloria Estefan (Note: English version only)
- Producer: Shakira

Shakira singles chronology
"Moscas en la Casa" (1999)	"Whenever, Wherever" / "Suerte" (2001)	"Te Dejo Madrid" (2002)

Music videos
- "Whenever, Wherever" on YouTube; "Suerte" on YouTube

"Whenever, Wherever" is a song recorded by Colombian singer-songwriter Shakira for her debut English-language studio album, Laundry Service (2001), her fifth overall. Shakira produced the track and wrote the lyrics to the original Spanish version, titled "Suerte" (English: "Good luck"), which Gloria Estefan later adapted to English. The music was co-written by the singer and Tim Mitchell, with additional production also handled by the latter. "Whenever, Wherever" was released as the lead single from Laundry Service, alongside "Suerte", on 27 August 2001, by Epic Records.

The song's lyrics are about how "lucky" the singer is to have found her romantic partner and the distance between the two she is willing to overcome, making multiple references to her native Colombia, the Andes and Argentina, her then partner Antonio de la Rúa's homeland. The song is a mix of Latin music and worldbeat that is heavily influenced by Andean music.

Upon its release, "Whenever, Wherever" received generally favorable reviews from music critics, who complimented its production. The song became her breakthrough hit in the United States, peaking at number six on the Billboard Hot 100. In doing so, it became her most successful single in the country, though it was eventually surpassed by "Hips Don't Lie" (featuring Wyclef Jean), which peaked at number one on the chart in 2006. The selection, additionally, topped charts in 22 countries, including her native Colombia and the majority of Latin America, Europe, The Middle East and Oceania. It is recognized as one of Shakira's signature songs, and was one of the most successful songs in the world in 2002. It is certified platinum or higher in seventeen countries including diamond in France.

== Background and release ==
After the 1998 release of her second major album, ¿Dónde Están los Ladrones?, achieved major success, Shakira released her first live album, MTV Unplugged: Shakira, in 2000. However, Shakira wanted a breakthrough in America and around the world with songs in English. Shakira explained:

Before assuming this big challenge of writing for the first time in English and making my first English album and presenting it to the world... of course I was feeling ready for it, a little bit scared... actually a lot scared. But I knew I could do it and my instincts always told me to go ahead and jump in the water.

Then, "Whenever, Wherever" was released as her debut English single on 27 September 2001. At the same time, she also released the selection's Spanish version, titled "Suerte", meaning "Good luck", for Spanish-speaking markets.

== Composition ==
"Whenever, Wherever" (2001)
The song is strongly influenced by Andean music and is one of the first songs to combine worldbeat with latin.

The lyrics to the song were originally written by Shakira in Spanish. Later on, Cuban-born American singer Gloria Estefan was credited as a co-lyricist for the English-language version. The song was produced by Shakira. It was arranged by the singer and Tim Mitchell, who also handled additional production. Sonically, the song is a mix of Latin music and worldbeat, with distinctive Andean instruments like the charango and the quena. "Whenever, Wherever" is composed in the key of C♯ minor. The song is heavily influenced by Andean music, and includes the charango and panpipes in its instrumentation.

Lyrically, "Whenever, Wherever" talks about fate and how it has played a major role in Shakira's romance. It starts with a guitar, similar to the 4-note riff from Pink Floyd's "Shine On, You Crazy Diamond," leading, beginning with baritone-range panpipes, to the explosive melody. Then, Shakira talks about how she would follow her boyfriend to the top of the highest mountain, risking life and limb to be intimate with him. In the chorus, she sings, "Whenever, wherever/We're meant to be together/I'll be there and you'll be near/And that's the deal my dear."

In the Spanish version, "Suerte", Shakira sings about how lucky she is to be who she is and where she is to have met this person. She calls him "my life" and says she wants to spend the rest of her days with him. Similar to the English version, she will climb mountains and she talks about her physical appearance with figurative language.

== Critical reception ==
"Whenever, Wherever" received mainly positive reviews from music critics. Alex Henderson of AllMusic picked the song as a highlight, writing that it's "infectious" and "it's to Shakira what 'Livin' la Vida Loca' was to Ricky Martin: the major hit that brought her to English-speaking audiences in a big way." Lisa Oliver of Yahoo! Music called it "the top track from the album by miles," writing that, "Despite such bemusement-inducing lyrics as 'lucky that my breasts are small and humble so you don't confuse them with mountains,' it still manages to make you sit up and fancy the synthetic-fiber trousers off her." The phrase was praised by The Guardian's Alexis Petridis, who called it "the most thought-provoking line of recent memory". The website Bland Is Out There also enjoyed the phrase, writing that "it's the most clever, self-confident couplet to hit radio in the long time." The review also wrote that the Spanish version, "Suerte", was far superior, explaining, "In English, Shakira's vocals are breathy and nasal. But in her native tongue, she's commanding and willowy." For David Browne of Entertainment Weekly, the song has a "shameless Latin-pop hook".

In 2020, Billboard included Whenever, Wherever among the 50 best Latin songs of all time, stating that "with its touches of South American folklore married to a rousing, unforgettable chorus and a danceable beat, "Whenever, Wherever" is still an anthem for love that knows no boundaries."

== Commercial performance ==
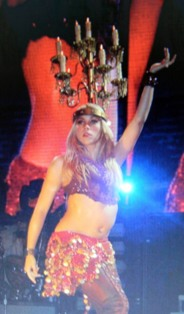
Shakira performing "Whenever, Wherever" during her Tour of the Mongoose in Rotterdam, 2003

"Whenever, Wherever" was Shakira's most successful single at the time, and it stayed that way until "Hips Don't Lie" (featuring Wyclef Jean) was released in five years. In the United States, "Whenever, Wherever" debuted at number 76 on the Billboard Hot 100 chart, while it peaked at number 6, the chart dated 29 December 2001. In doing so, it became her first top 10 single on the chart. Additionally, the track peaked at numbers 1, 3, and 4 respectively on the Billboard Hot Latin Tracks, Latin Pop Airplay, Hot Dance Club Play, and Top 40 Tracks component charts. In Canada, the song peaked at number 4. According to Sony Music Canada, the song has sold over 2 million copies in the United States. In Australia, the song debuted at number 1, on 10 February 2002, remaining at the top for six weeks. In New Zealand, the song debuted at number 39 on the RIANZ chart, on 20 January 2002, while it reached the number-1 spot in its fourth week. It spent 8 non-consecutive weeks at the top, becoming her highest-charting single.

In Europe, "Whenever, Wherever" became a major success, topping the charts of more than 15 countries, quickly establishing Shakira's presence in the European mainstream. In the United Kingdom, the song became Shakira's first top three hit on the UK Singles Chart, peaking at number two for two consecutive weeks, and eventually spent ten weeks in the top 10 of the chart, as well as 19 weeks in the top 75. The song currently stands as the seventh bestselling song by a female artist in the 21st century in the United Kingdom. It is also the 38th bestselling single of the 2000s decade in the UK. In Austria, the song remained at the top for seven weeks, while in France, it remained for four weeks. In Italy, the song debuted at number 1, staying at the top for one further week. Later, it fell to number 4, climbed to number 2 and reached the top again. Later, it fell to number 2 and attained the top once again. Later, the song fell to number 2 and climbed to number 1, where it remained for two further weeks, spending seven non-consecutive weeks at the top, and becoming the best-selling single of 2002. In Switzerland, the song debuted at number 9 on the singles chart, and the following week, it reached the number-one position, where it remained for a total of seventeen consecutive weeks, becoming the 22nd most successful song of the decade in that country. Topping the charts for 17 weeks, it also set a record in being the longest time on the number one spot in the country, until it was surpassed in 2017 by Luis Fonsi and Daddy Yankee's "Despacito", which spent 20 weeks atop. In February 2014 "Whenever, Wherever" entered the UK Singles Chart again at number 99.

The Spanish version of the song, "Suerte", also co-written by Shakira and Mitchell, was released as a single in Spain, Mexico as well as in several countries in South America. It too became a huge hit, peaking at number 1 on Billboard's Hot Latin Tracks chart for seven non-consecutive weeks and remained within the top 10 of the chart for over four months. It also topped the charts in almost all of the Spanish-speaking countries where it was released.

In 2020, Billboard revealed that "Suerte" was the 16th most successful Latin song of all time on the Hot Latin Songs. Rolling Stone named it the 8th greatest Spanish-language song of the 21st century in 2025.

=== Resurgence in 2020 ===
Following Shakira's 2020 Super Bowl LIV halftime show performance co-headlined with American singer Jennifer Lopez, "Whenever, Wherever" became the highest-selling song performed at the Super Bowl halftime show with 4,000 digital downloads on the first day up by 1,264%. The following week, the song became the highest-charting song performed at the Super Bowl halftime show on Billboard's Digital Song Sales chart, peaking at number 4. The same week the Spanish version of the song, "Suerte", topped Billboard's Latin Digital Songs chart.

== Music video ==
Shakira after she rises from the ocean in the music video for "Whenever, Wherever"

The music video was directed by Francis Lawrence. Its cinematography was handled by Pascal Lebègue. A blue screen was used, and features Shakira surrounded by Earth's natural wonders. It begins with her submerged in the ocean, the only part of the video that is not shot on a blue screen; the underwater part is real as her hair is flowing freely and she is blowing soft bubbles from her nose and mouth. She leaps out of the water onto the surrounding rocks and observing a landscape of mountains; a falcon flies down towards her.

Shakira then proceeds to walk barefoot into the desert while belly-dancing, where she is soon seen dancing amid a stampede of horses. The stampede suddenly stops, and she kneels into a shallow pool of mud, and begins crawling through it. As the video nears its conclusion, she is on top of a snowy mountain before jumping off, descending into water and submerging herself once more, as the video comes full circle. The video was shot twice, the other version being for "Suerte"/"Luck", with Lawrence directing both versions.

The music video achieved considerable success on music television. It became Shakira's first video to be retired from MTV's Total Request Live and reached number one for a week on the Canadian MuchMusic Countdown. At the 3rd Latin Grammy Awards in 2002, it won Best Short Form Music Video, and later that year "Suerte" received the inaugural MTV Video Music Award Latin America for Video of the Year. Two remix versions of the video were also produced, featuring the "Tracy Young Spin Cycle Mix" and the "Tracy Young Tribal Mix".

In 2018, Billboard included "Whenever, Wherever" among the 100 greatest music videos of the 21st century, stating that it "introduced Shakira's swiveling hips to the world", and that its "minimalist production, which memorably featured Shakira dancing alone without props, musicians or other dancers, was enough to catapult her to international stardom."

== Other versions and live performances ==
Shakira recorded a studio recording of the live version of "Whenever, Wherever", which was used for television performances, for both the English and Spanish versions of the song. It was called the "TV Edit". She sang the original CD version only once, on the 2001 Radio Music Awards, where she performed the song live for the first time. A remix of the song was included on the re-release of Laundry Service, Laundry Service: Washed & Dried. This was titled the "Sahara Mix", and was completely transformed from the original version, instead being given a heavy Middle Eastern feel. For her world tour, the Tour of the Mongoose, Shakira took the drums that begin the "Sahara Mix" and incorporated them into an intro for the original version of "Whenever, Wherever/Suerte", which extended the amount of time Shakira had to interact with the audience. She also included the same intro for "Whenever, Wherever/Suerte" for her second world tour, the Oral Fixation Tour. However, for this tour, she danced to the drums with a rope, as opposed to dancing with a candelabra on her head as she did during the Tour of the Mongoose. To promote the DVD Live & off the Record, Shakira used the song as a second single, editing the original live version to a radio edit version and video edit version, which was included in the "Poem to a Horse" promo. During The Sun Comes Out World Tour, Shakira gave the song a more rock-oriented sound, mixed it with a cover of the English band EMF's "Unbelievable", and brought select men and women from the audience on stage for a short dance lesson.

Shakira performed "Whenever, Wherever" in the United States at The Rosie O'Donnell Show and The Tonight Show with Jay Leno on 13 and 15 November respectively. She also made an appearance as musical guest on MTV’s Total Request Live (TRL) in 9 November, on NBC’s Saturday Night Live (SNL) in 1 December, and at Live with Regis and Kelly in 7 December.

The song was performed by Shakira during the Super Bowl LIV halftime show. Following that performance, the song went number one on the iTunes singles chart.

== Track listings ==
- Japanese single (EICP 53)
1. "Whenever, Wherever" – 3:17
2. "Objection (Tango)" – 3:43
- European single (671913 3)
1. "Whenever, Wherever" – 3:16
2. "Suerte" – 3:14
- "Suerte" European single (671913 9)
1. "Suerte (Whenever, Wherever)" – 3:14
2. "Whenever, Wherever" – 3:16
- Australia (672196 2)
1. "Whenever, Wherever" – 3:16
2. "Suerte (Whenever, Whenever)" – 3:14
3. "Whenever, Wherever" (TV edit) – 3:39
4. "Inevitable" – 3:13
- Europe (671913 8)
1. "Whenever, Wherever" (album version) – 3:16
2. "Whenever, Wherever" (TV edit) – 3:39
3. "Suerte" (album version) – 3:14
4. "Suerte" (TV edit) – 3:38
- European CD maxi-single (EPC 671913 2)
1. "Whenever, Wherever" – 3:16
2. "Suerte" – 3:14
3. "Estoy Aquí" – 3:55
4. "Tú" – 3:36
- European 4-track WW (672426 2)
1. "Whenever, Wherever" – 3:16
2. "Suerte (Whenever, Wherever)" – 3:14
3. "Whenever, Wherever" (Tracy Young's Spin Cycle Mix) – 7:03
4. "Whenever, Wherever" (video)
- WW/"Suerte" Europe (671913 7)
1. "Whenever, Wherever" (TV edit) – 3:39
2. "Suerte (Whenever, Wherever)" – 3:14
3. "Estoy Aquí" – 3:52
4. "Tú" – 3:36
5. "Whenever, Wherever" (Tracy Young's Spin Cycle Mix) – 7:03
6. "Whenever, Wherever" (Dark Side of the Moon Mix) – 7:45
- Australian (CD-R acetate)
1. "Whenever, Wherever" (Tracy Young's Spin Cycle Mix) – 7:02
2. "Whenever, Wherever" (Acapella 121 BPM) – 3:36
3. "Whenever, Wherever" (Tee's Blue Dub – New Version) – 7:37
4. "Whenever, Wherever" (The Dark Side of the Moon Mix) – 8:14
- European 12-inch vinyl (671913 6)
1. "Whenever, Wherever" – 3:16
2. "Whenever, Wherever" (Tracy Young's Spin Cycle Mix) – 7:03
3. "Whenever, Wherever" (A Cappella 121 BPM) – 3:37
4. "Whenever, Wherever" (Tee's Blue Dub New Version) – 7:37
5. "Whenever, Wherever" (The Dark Side of the Moon Mix) – 7:45
- US 7-inch (ZSS79642B) (34–79642)
1. "Whenever, Wherever"
2. "Suerte (Whenever, Whenever)"
- WW Europe 12-inch (SAMPMS 12235-0122356000)
1. "Whenever, Wherever" (Sahara Mix) – 3:56
2. "Whenever, Wherever" (Hammad Belly Dance Mix) – 3:45
- US 4-track 12-inch (EAS-16691-S1)
1. "Whenever, Wherever" (Tracy Young's Spin Cycle Mix)
2. "Whenever, Wherever" (A Cappella 121 BPM)
3. "Whenever, Wherever" (Tee's Blue Dub)
4. "Whenever, Wherever" (The Dark Side of the Moon Mix)
- Cassette (672426 4)
1. "Whenever, Wherever" (Album version) – 3:16
2. "Suerte" (Album version) – 3:14
3. "Whenever, Wherever" (The Dark Side of the Moon Mix) – 7:45

== Charts ==
=== "Whenever, Wherever" ===
==== Weekly charts ====
2001–2002 weekly chart performance for "Whenever, Wherever"
Chart (2001–2002)	Peak position
Australia (ARIA)	1
Austria (Ö3 Austria Top 40)	1
Belgium (Ultratop 50 Flanders)	1
Belgium (Ultratop 50 Wallonia)	1
Canada (Nielsen SoundScan)	4
Canada CHR (Nielsen BDS)	2
Denmark (Tracklisten)	1
Europe (Eurochart Hot 100)	1
Finland (Suomen virallinen lista)	1
France (SNEP)	1
Germany (GfK)	1
Greece (IFPI)	1
Hungary (Rádiós Top 40)	1
Hungary (Single Top 40)	1
Ireland (IRMA)	1
Italy (FIMI)	1
Netherlands (Dutch Top 40)	1
Netherlands (Single Top 100)	1
New Zealand (Recorded Music NZ)	1
Norway (VG-lista)	1
Poland Airplay (Music & Media)	1
Portugal (AFP)	1
Romania (Romanian Top 100)	2
Russia Airplay (Music & Media)	1
Scottish Singles Sales (Official Charts)	2
Sweden (Sverigetopplistan)	1
Switzerland (Schweizer Hitparade)	1
UK Singles (Official Charts)	2
US Billboard Hot 100	6
US Adult Pop Airplay (Billboard)	32
US Dance Club Songs (Billboard)	3
US Pop Airplay (Billboard)	4
US Rhythmic Airplay (Billboard)	27
US Top 40 Tracks (Billboard)	4

2014–2025 weekly chart performance for "Whenever, Wherever"
Chart (2014–2025)	Peak position
Canadian Digital Song Sales (Billboard)	13
Czech Republic Singles Digital (ČNS IFPI)	82
Kazakhstan Airplay (TopHit)	58
Romania Airplay (TopHit)	88
Scottish Singles Sales (Official Charts)	71
UK Singles (Official Charts)	99
UK Singles Downloads (Official Charts)	65
UK Singles Sales (OCC)	69
US Digital Song Sales (Billboard)	4

==== Monthly charts ====
Monthly chart performance for "Whenever, Wherever"
Chart (2024)	Peak position
Kazakhstan Airplay (TopHit)	92

==== Year-end charts ====
2001 year-end chart performance for "Whenever, Wherever"
Chart (2001)	Position
Brazil (Crowley)	44

2002 year-end chart performance for "Whenever, Wherever"
Chart (2002)	Position
Australia (ARIA)	2
Austria (Ö3 Austria Top 40)	1
Belgium (Ultratop 50 Flanders)	3
Belgium (Ultratop 50 Wallonia)	3
Brazil (Crowley)	30
Canada (Nielsen SoundScan)	69
Canada Radio (Nielsen BDS)	36
Europe (Eurochart Hot 100)	2
Finland (Suomen virallinen lista)	8
France (SNEP)	3
Germany (Media Control)	2
Ireland (IRMA)	4
Italy (FIMI)	2
Netherlands (Dutch Top 40)	2
Netherlands (Single Top 100)	2
New Zealand (RIANZ)	5
Sweden (Hitlistan)	2
Switzerland (Schweizer Hitparade)	2
Taiwan (Yearly Singles Top 100)	41
UK Singles (OCC)	7
UK Airplay (Music Week)	12
US Billboard Hot 100	28
US Mainstream Top 40 (Billboard)	20
US Rhythmic Top 40 (Billboard)	94
US Top 40 Tracks (Billboard)	20

2004 year-end chart performance for "Whenever, Wherever"
Chart (2004)	Position
Hungary (Rádiós Top 40)	99

2013 year-end chart performance for "Whenever, Wherever"
Chart (2013)	Position
US Latin Digital Song Sales (Billboard)	14

2014 year-end chart performance for "Whenever, Wherever"
Chart (2014)	Position
US Latin Digital Song Sales (Billboard)	17

2015 year-end chart performance for "Whenever, Wherever"
Chart (2015)	Position
US Latin Digital Song Sales (Billboard)	31

2016 year-end chart performance for "Whenever, Wherever"
Chart (2016)	Position
US Latin Digital Song Sales (Billboard)	27

2020 year-end chart performance for "Whenever, Wherever"
Chart (2020)	Position
US Latin Digital Song Sales (Billboard)	5

2024 year-end chart performance for "Whenever, Wherever"
Chart (2024)	Position
Kazakhstan Airplay (TopHit)	158

==== Decade-end charts ====
Decade-end chart performance for "Whenever, Wherever"
Chart (2000–2009)	Position
Australia (ARIA)	21
Austria (Ö3 Austria Top 40)	15
Germany (Media Control GfK)	11
Netherlands (Single Top 100)	6
UK Singles (OCC)	38

==== All-time charts ====
All-timechart performance for "Whenever, Wherever"
Chart	Position
UK Singles (21st century)	83

=== "Suerte" ===
==== Weekly charts ====
2001–2002 weekly chart performance for "Suerte"
Chart (2001–2002)	Peak position
Honduras (Notimex)	2
Spain (Promusicae)	1
US Hot Latin Songs (Billboard)	1
US Latin Pop Airplay (Billboard)	1
US Tropical Airplay (Billboard)	2

2020 weekly chart performance for "Suerte"
Chart (2020)	Peak position
US Latin Digital Song Sales (Billboard)	1

==== Year-end charts ====
2001 year-end chart performance for "Suerte"
Chart (2001)	Position
Spain (AFYVE)	5

2002 year-end chart performance for "Suerte"
Chart (2002)	Position
US Hot Latin Tracks (Billboard)	3
US Latin Pop Airplay (Billboard)	2
US Tropical/Salsa Airplay (Billboard)	15

==== All-time charts ====
All-time chart performance for "Suerte"
Chart	Position
US Hot Latin Songs (Billboard)	15

== Certifications and sales ==
=== "Whenever Wherever" ===
Certifications and sales for "Whenever, Wherever"
Region	Certification	Certified units/sales
Australia (ARIA)	4× Platinum	280,000^{‡}
Austria (IFPI Austria)	Platinum	40,000^{*}
Belgium (BRMA)	2× Platinum	100,000^{*}
Brazil (Pro-Música Brasil)	Platinum	60,000^{‡}
Canada (Music Canada)	4× Platinum	320,000^{‡}
Denmark (IFPI Danmark)	Platinum	90,000^{‡}
Finland (Musiikkituottajat)	Gold	5,477
France (SNEP)	Diamond	1,000,000
Germany (BVMI)	3× Gold	750,000^{^}
Greece (IFPI Greece)	Platinum	20,000^{^}
Italy (FIMI)	Gold	25,000^{*}
Mexico (AMPROFON)	3× Platinum+Gold	210,000^{‡}
Netherlands (NVPI)	Platinum	60,000^{^}
New Zealand (RMNZ)	2× Platinum	60,000^{‡}
Norway (IFPI Norway)	3× Platinum	
Norway (IFPI Norway) reissue	Platinum	60,000^{‡}
Spain (Promusicae)	Gold	30,000^{‡}
Sweden (GLF)	2× Platinum	60,000^{^}
Switzerland (IFPI Switzerland)	2× Platinum	80,000^{^}
United Kingdom (BPI)	3× Platinum	1,800,000^{‡}
United States (RIAA)	2× Platinum	2,000,000^{‡}
^{‡} Sales+streaming figures based on certification alone.

=== "Suerte" ===
Certifications and sales for "Suerte"
Region	Certification	Certified units/sales
Mexico (AMPROFON)	Diamond+Platinum	360,000^{‡}
Spain (Promusicae)	Platinum	60,000^{‡}
^{*} Sales figures based on certification alone.^{^} Shipments figures based on certification alone.^{‡} Sales+streaming figures based on certification alone.

== Release history ==
Release dates and formats for "Whenever, Wherever" and "Suerte"
Region	Date	Format(s)	Label(s)	Ref.
Colombia	27 August 2001	Radio airplay	Sony Music	
United States	27 August 2001	Radio airplay	Epic	
Latin America	30 August 2001	Radio airplay	Sony Music	
United States	2 October 2001	Contemporary hit radio; rhythmic contemporary radio	Epic	
Germany	21 January 2002	CD; maxi CD	Sony Music	
Australia	28 January 2002	Maxi CD	Sony Music	
New Zealand	28 January 2002	Maxi CD	Sony Music	
Japan	20 February 2002	CD	Sony Music Japan	
United Kingdom	25 February 2002	Cassette; maxi CD	Epic	
France	4 March 2002	CD	Epic	
France	25 March 2002	Maxi CD	Epic	

== Covers and samples ==
- "Whenever", by Kris Kross Amsterdam and the Boy Next Door and featuring vocals by Conor Maynard, was released in 2018. It is an adaptation and rearrangement of the Shakira song with new lyrics and new musical compositions. The refrain samples Shakira's version.
- "Whatever", by Kygo and Ava Max from the album Kygo, was released in 2024 and interpolates "Whenever, Wherever"'s chorus.

== See also ==
- List of best-selling singles of the 2000s in Australia
- List of best-selling singles of the 2000s (decade) in the United Kingdom
- French Top 100 singles of the 2000s
- List of best-selling singles in France
- List of best-selling singles by year (Germany)
