= Animal (Conor Maynard song) =

Single by Conor Maynard featuring Wiley

from the album Contrast
- Released: 20 January 2013
- Recorded: 2012
- Genre: Dance-pop
- Length: 3:16 (album version); 3:25 (feat. Wiley)
- Label: Parlophone
- Songwriter(s): Conor Maynard; George Astasio; Jason Pebworth; Jon Shave; Sophie Stern; Kurtis McKenzie; Joey Dyer; Jon Mills
- Producer(s): The Invisible Men; The Arcade

Conor Maynard singles chronology
"Turn Around" (2012)	"Animal" (2013)	"R U Crazy" (2013)

Wiley singles chronology
"Banger" (2013)	"Animal" (2013)	"Reload" (2013)

"Animal" is a song by British singer Conor Maynard from his debut studio album, Contrast. It was released as the album's fourth single as a digital download on 20 January 2013, featuring vocals from English rapper, MC, songwriter, record producer and recording artist Wiley (also known as "The Godfather of Grime"). The song was written by Conor Maynard, The Invisible Men, Sophie Stern, Kurtis McKenzie, Joey Dyer, Jon Mills and produced by The Invisible Men, The Arcade. The song entered the UK Singles Chart at number 34 on 20 January 2013, climbing twenty-eight places the following week to number 6, becoming Maynard's third highest-charting single.

== Music video ==
A music video to accompany the release of "Animal" was first released onto YouTube on 11 December 2012 at a total length of three minutes and twenty-eight seconds.

== Critical reception ==
Lewis Corner of Digital Spy gave the song a positive review, praising its "militant beats and wall-bouncing synths", and saying:

Despite his sex-charged pleas to "mess me up" being at odds with his boyish charm, 12 months on we're still standing by our judgement that Conor is one of pop's most exciting new stars..

== Track listing ==
Album version
No.	Title	Length
1.	"Animal"	3:16

Digital download
No.	Title	Length
1.	"Animal" (feat. Wiley)	3:25
2.	"Animal" (Wideboys Remix)	3:48
3.	"Animal"	3:16
4.	"Diamonds" (Live)	3:21
5.	"Don't You Worry Child" (Acoustic)	3:05

== Credits and personnel ==
- Lead vocals – Conor Maynard, Wiley
- Producers – The Invisible Men, The Arcade
- Lyrics – Conor Maynard, The Invisible Men, Sophie Stern, Kurtis McKenzie, Joey Dyer, Jon Mills
- Label: Parlophone

== Chart performance ==
=== Weekly charts ===
Chart (2013)	Peak position
Belgium (Ultratip Bubbling Under Flanders)	47
Czech Republic (Rádio – Top 100)	74
Ireland (IRMA)	27
Scotland (OCC)	6
Slovakia (Rádio Top 100)	34
UK Singles (OCC)	6

=== Year-end charts ===
Chart (2013)	Peak position
UK Singles (Official Charts Company)	147

== Certifications ==
Region	Certification	Certified units/sales
United Kingdom (BPI)	Silver	200,000^{‡}
^{‡} Sales+streaming figures based on certification alone.

== Release history ==
Region	Date	Format	Label
United Kingdom	20 January 2013	Digital Download	Parlophone
