= Whenever =

Whenever may refer to:

== Music ==
=== Albums ===
- Whenever, a 2004 album by When
- Whenever (Atmosphere album), 2019
- Whenever, a 2017 album by Sbfive

=== Songs ===
- "Whenever" (song), 2018 song by Kris Kross Amsterdam and The Boy Next Door featuring Conor Maynard
- "Whenever", a song by Beth Orton from the 1996 album Trailer Park
- "Whenever", a song by Black Eyed Peas from the 2010 album The Beginning
- "Whenever", a song by Jacques Greene from the 2019 album Dawn Chorus

== Other uses ==
- Whenever (play), a 2000 children's musical play with words by Alan Ayckbourn and music by Denis King
