= Kris Kross Amsterdam =

Dutch DJ trio

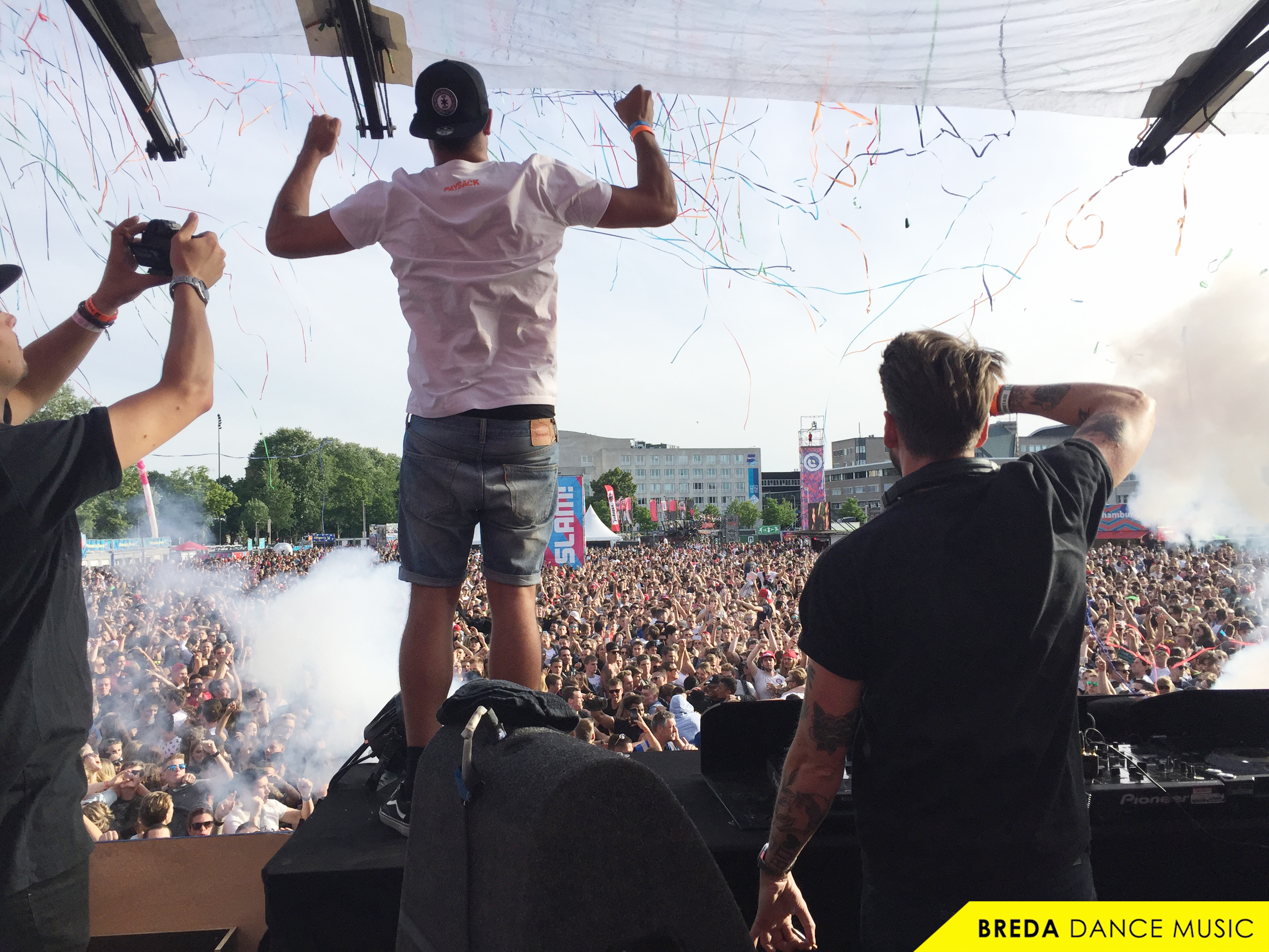
- Kris Kross Amsterdam performing in Breda, 2017

Background information
- Origin: Amsterdam, Netherlands
- Genres: EDM; house; trap; hip hop; R&B; funk; dancehall
- Years active: 2011–present
- Label: Spinnin' Records
- Members: Jordy Huisman; Sander Huisman; Yuki Kempees
- Website: kriskross.amsterdam

Kris Kross Amsterdam is a Dutch DJ and record producer trio formed by brothers Jordy and Sander Huisman and Yuki Kempees. Their music is a mix of various music styles including R&B, hip hop, funk, soul, pop and house.

The name is a nod to the famous rap duo Kris Kross from the early 1990s, known for their hit single "Jump".

== Career ==
Kris Kross Amsterdam was started by two brothers in 2011 in Amsterdam. With their name paying homage to the American hip hop duo Kris Kross, they started hosting parties in Amsterdam where they began to play a mix of R&B, hip hop, twerk, trap and house. In 2014, MC Yuki Kempees joined them.

In June 2015, Kris Kross Amsterdam signed a deal with dance record label Spinnin' Records and released their debut single "Until the Morning" with MC CHOCO.

In February 2016, KKA dropped multiple releases on the label, catching worldwide attention. Amongst those releases are the international hit single "Sex" with American electronic music trio Cheat Codes, which samples the chorus from "Let's Talk About Sex"., Are You Sure?, a collaboration with British pop star Conor Maynard and American hip hop artist Ty Dolla $ign, and the most recent release with Conor and The Boy Next Door, "Whenever". This track originated from Shakira's "Whenever, Wherever". The song got over a million streams each day and charted on the Billboard Dance Chart.

Next to making singles, they do shows worldwide. They hosted several stages and highlighted sets at Mysteryland (NL), Tomorrowland (BE), Parookaville (GE), Ultra Music Festival (US).

On 12 May 2023, KKA released the single "How You Samba" alongside British rapper Tinie Tempah and Mexican singer Sofía Reyes.

== Discography ==
=== Singles ===
List of singles, with selected chart positions and certifications
Title	Year	Peak chart positions										Certifications
Title	Year	NLD	AUS	AUT	BEL (Fl)	FRA	GER	IRL	SWI	UK	US Elec.	Certifications
"Until the Morning" (with Choco)	2015	—	—	—	—	—	—	—	—	—	—	
"Sex" (with Cheat Codes)	2016	2	17	19	25	124	14	9	27	9	10	ARIA: 2× Platinum; BPI: Gold; BVMI: Platinum; RIAA: Gold
"Are You Sure?" (with Conor Maynard featuring Ty Dolla Sign)	2016	15	—	—	—	—	—	—	—	—	37	
"Gone Is the Night" (featuring Jorge Blanco)	2017	—	—	—	—	—	—	—	—	—	—	
"Whenever" (with the Boy Next Door featuring Conor Maynard)	2018	3	—	56	25	120	46	34	68	95	18	BEA: Gold
"Vámonos" (with Ally Brooke x Messiah)	2018	—	—	—	32	—	—	—	—	—	—	
"Hij Is van mij" (with Maan, Tabitha featuring Bizzey)	2018	1	—	—	72	—	—	—	—	—	—	NVPI: 4× Platinum
"Moment" (with Kraantje Pappie and Tabitha)	2019	5	—	—	—	—	—	—	—	—	—	NVPI: 4× Platinum
"Ik sta jou beter" (with Nielson)	2019	23	—	—	53	—	—	—	—	—	—	
"Ooh Girl" (with Conor Maynard featuring A Boogie wit da Hoodie)	2019	—	—	—	76	—	—	—	—	—	—	
"Loop niet weg" (with Tino Martin and Emma Heesters)	2020	3	—	—	—	—	—	—	—	—	—	NVPI: 2× Platinum
"Donderdag" (with Bilal Wahib and Emma Heesters)	2020	3	—	—	—	—	—	—	—	—	—	NVPI: Gold; NVPI: Gold (solo)
"Tranen" (with Kraantje Pappie and Pommelien Thijs)	2021	73	—	—	14	—	—	—	—	—	—	
"Early in the Morning" (with Shaggy and Conor Maynard)	2021	3	—	—	11	—	—	—	—	—	—	
"Increíble" (with Rolf Sanchez)	2021	63	—	—	—	—	—	—	—	—	—	
"You Can Call Me Al" (with Zikai)	2021	—	—	—	—	—	—	—	—	—	—	
"Vluchtstrook" (with Antoon and Sigourney K)	2021	1	—	—	2	—	—	—	—	—	—	NVPI: 3× Platinum (as Kriss Kross Amsterdam); NVPI: Platinum (as Kris Kross Amsterdam)
"Vanavond (Uit m'n bol)" (with Donnie and Tino Martin)	2022	2	—	—	—	—	—	—	—	—	—	NVPI: Platinum
"Adrenaline" (with Ronnie Flex and Zoë Tauran)	2022	6	—	—	8	—	—	—	—	—	—	NVPI: Gold
"Der af (Oya Lélé)" (with Donnie and Roxeanne Hazes)	2023	29	—	—	—	—	—	—	—	—	—	
"How You Samba" (with Sofía Reyes and Tinie Tempah)	2023	4	—	—	17	—	—	—	—	—	—	
"Stay (Never Leave)" (with Sera and Conor Maynard)	2023	17	—	—	24	—	—	—	—	—	—	
"Zomer in m'n bol" (with Donnie and Tino Martin featuring André Hazas)	2024	61	—	—	—	—	—	—	—	—	—	
"Queen of My Castle" (with Inna)	2024	32	—	—	—	189	—	—	—	—	—	
"Vleugels" (with Antoon and Zoë Tauran)	2024	36	—	—	—	—	—	—	—	—	—	
"Ze komt uit Amsterdam" (with André Hazes and Tabitha)	2025	15	—	—	—	—	—	—	—	—	—	
"Zij hoort bij mij" (with Frans Bauer vs. Jan Smit)	2026	26	—	—	—	—	—	—	—	—	—	
"My Oh My" (featuring Lúisa Sonza and Willy William)	2026	—	—	—	18	—	—	—	—	—	—	
"—" denotes a recording that did not chart or was not released in that territory.

=== Remixes ===
- 2016: Dvbbs and Shaun Frank featuring Delaney Jane - "La La Land" (Kris Kross Amsterdam Remix)
- 2016: David Guetta featuring Zara Larsson - "This One's for You" (Kris Kross Amsterdam Remix)
- 2016: Britney Spears featuring G-Eazy - "Make Me..." (Kris Kross Amsterdam Remix)
