= Can't Say No =

2012 single by Conor Maynard

Single by Conor Maynard

from the album Contrast
- Released: 2 March 2012
- Recorded: 2011
- Genre: urban pop
- Length: 3:14
- Label: Parlophone
- Songwriter(s): Conor Maynard; The Invisible Men; Sophie Stern; Jon Mills; Joe Dyer; Kurtis McKenzie
- Producer(s): The Invisible Men; The Arcade

Conor Maynard singles chronology
"Can't Say No" (2012)	"Vegas Girl" (2012)

"Can't Say No" is the debut single by British singer Conor Maynard. It was first released on 2 March 2012 in Belgium, then in the United Kingdom on 29 April 2012. The song is the lead single of his debut album Contrast The song was written and produced by the Invisible Men with additional production from the Arcade and was also written by Sophie Stern, Jon Mills, Joe Dyer, Kurtis McKenzie and Maynard.

== Music video ==
A music video to accompany the release of "Can't Say No" was first released onto YouTube on 1 March 2012 at a total length of three minutes and fifteen seconds. The video follows Maynard as he meets his friends as they all go to a party. It was directed by Rohan Blair-Mangat

== Critical reception ==
Lewis Corner of Digital Spy gave the song a positive review stating:

'He croons over buzzing bass and crisp beats, before things tumble into an ear-grabbing chorus bouncier than an inflatable castle. In fact, the final result is much the same; it's playful, fun and immediately leaves you wanting another go..

== Track listing ==
Digital download
No.	Title	Length
1.	"Can't Say No"	3:14

Digital EP and Signed CD Single (Limited to 500 Copies)
No.	Title	Length
1.	"Can't Say No"	3:14
2.	"Can't Say No" (Lazy J Radio Edit)	2:59
3.	"Can't Say No" (Document One Remix)	3:59
4.	"Can't Say No" (Drums of London Remix)	3:54
5.	"Can't Say No" (Acoustic)	3:03
6.	"Crew Love"	2:40

== Chart performance ==
=== Weekly charts ===
Chart (2012)	Peak position
Australia (ARIA)	38
Belgium (Ultratop 50 Flanders)	35
Belgium (Ultratip Bubbling Under Wallonia)	17
Canada (Canadian Hot 100)	75
Germany (GfK)	63
Ireland (IRMA)	13
New Zealand (Recorded Music NZ)	21
Scotland (OCC)	3
UK Singles (OCC)	2
UK Official Streaming Chart Top 100	16

=== Year-end charts ===
Chart (2012)	Position
UK Singles Chart	93

== Certifications ==
Region	Certification	Certified units/sales
Australia (ARIA)	Gold	35,000^{^}
United Kingdom (BPI)	Silver	200,000^{*}
^{*} Sales figures based on certification alone.^{^} Shipments figures based on certification alone.

== Release history ==
Region	Date	Format
Belgium	2 March 2012	Digital download & signed CD single (UK)
United Kingdom	15 April 2012	Digital download & signed CD single (UK)
United States	24 April 2012	Digital download
