= The Invisible Men =

Songwriting and music production duo

- Genres: Pop; hip hop; trap; R&B
- Occupations: Songwriters; record producers
- Members: Jason Pebworth; George Astasio
- Past members: Jon Shave

The Invisible Men is a song writing and music production trio consisting of Jason Pebworth, George Astasio and (former member) Jon Shave. Songs written by The Invisible Men have so far achieved over 7 billion Spotify streams, 30 million record sales worldwide and the duo has frequently ranked among Music Week's Top Songwriters. The duo's song writing and production catalogue includes Becky Hill & Sigala's "Heaven On My Mind", Sigala's "Say You Do" and "Just Got Paid" (with Ella Eyre and Meghan Trainor), DJ Fresh's "Hot Right Now" and "Dibby Dibby Sound" (with Jay Fay), Conor Maynard's "Can't Say No" and "Vegas Girl", Jessie J's hits "Do It Like A Dude", "LaserLight", and "Who's Laughing Now?", and the Noisettes' "Don't Upset the Rhythm (Go Baby Go)" and "Never Forget You".

== Career ==
Prior to forming The Invisible Men, Jason Pebworth and George Astasio were members of the band Orson, which was considered commercially successful.

Jon Shave was a member of Xenomania.

They co-produced and co-composed Iggy Azalea's "Fancy" (featuring Charli XCX). The Duo also collaborated with Azalea on her US debut single, "Work", and a vast portion of Azalea's debut album The New Classic.

== IIVI ==
The Invisible Men also produce music under the name "IIVI". IIVI co-produced six of the seven tracks on Lil Peep's 2017 album "Come Over When You're Sober Pt. 1", as well as the majority of its follow-up "Pt. 2", alongside other stand-alone tracks including "Falling Down" (with XXXTentacion), I've Been Waiting (with iLoveMakonnen) and When I Lie (Remix) (with Ty Dolla Sign).

Pitchfork described their sound as "the 808s and rumbling basslines of trap music [combined] with the guitars of early 00s emo music to create an atmosphere that is at once hard-hitting yet bleak", mixing "emotive riffs with the slap of rap drums".

== Discography ==
Productions and co-writes:

Year	Artist	Song	Album	Notes
2023	Lil Peep	IDGAF 2, Sidelines, Hocus Pocus, Cry Baby 2	Diamonds	as IIVI
2023	Flowerovlove	Love You, Coffee Shop		
2022	Flowerovlove	Get With You		
2022	Kamille	Weight Loss		
2022	Flowerovlove	Hannah Montana		
2022	Sigala ft. Talia Mar	Stay The Night		
2022	Dopamine	Delete It		
2022	Charli XCX	Used To Know Me	CRASH	
2021	Dopamine X Ali Story	Deep		
2021	Billy Porter	Children		
2021	Kara Marni	Over You, Motive		
2021	Mufasa & Hypeman X Dopamine	Weekend		
2021	Diane Warren, Rita Ora, Sofia Reyes, Reik	Seaside	Diane Warren: The Cave Sessions, Vol. 1	
2021	Finn Askew	Adidas		
2021	Kara Marni	Second Nature	State of Mine EP	
2021	Jacob Sartorious	For Real, Trapped In The Car		
2021	Hugel	Back To Life		
2021	Kara Marni	Twisted Fantasy		
2021	Riton X Nightcrawlers featuring Mufasa and Hypeman	Friday (Dopamine Re-Edit)		
2021	Kara Marni	Trippin	State of Mine EP	
2020	Little Mix	Breathe	Confetti	UK (BPI) Gold
2020	Becky Hill, Sigala	Heaven On My Mind		UK (BPI) Gold
2020	Example	Ain't One Thing	Some Nights Last For Days	
2020	Monsta X	Misbehave	All About Luv	
2020	Tommy Down	Mrs Blue		
2020	Bexey	Go Mode, Witchcraft Girls	Blood, Magic & Diamonds	
2020	Cailin Russo	Declaration, Sicko	The Drama	
2019	Lil Peep	I've Been Waiting (Original Version) (ft. iLoveMakonnen), walk away as the door slams (acoustic) (ft. Lil Tracy)	Everybody's Everything	as IIVI
2019	Miley Cyrus / Ashley O	On A Roll, Right Where I Belong	On A Roll (Single)	Music written for Black Mirror episode "Rachel, Jack and Ashley Too"
2019	Kara Marni	All Night pt.1, All Night pt. 2		
2019	Lil Peep, Ty Dolla $ign	When I Lie (Remix)	For The Throne (Music Inspired by the HBO Series Game of Thrones)	as IIVI
2019	Cheryl	Let You		
2019	Bexey	Hot Steppa, Tru Colours		as IIVI
2019	Rak-Su	Yours or Mine		
2019	Kara Marni	Lose My Love		
2018	Clean Bandit	Playboy Style (ft. Charli XCX & Bhad Bhabie)	What Is Love?	
2018	Lil Peep	Broken Smile (My All), Cry Alone, Leanin', 16 Lines, Life Is Beautiful, Hate Me, IDGAF, White Girl	Come Over When You're Sober, Pt. 2	as IIVI
2018	Madison Beer ft. Offset	Hurts Like Hell		
2018	Cheryl	Love Made Me Do It		
2018	Lil Peep, XXXTentacion	Falling Down		as IIVI
2018	Bexey	Take A Shot, Hell Bound, Come Alive, Spooky Electrick, Prince of the Lost and Broken, Bloody Hell	Spooky Electrick	as IIVI
2018	Sigala	What You Waiting For (feat. Kylie Minogue)	Brighter Days	
2018	Kara Marni	Move		
2018	Sigala, Ella Eyre, Meghan Trainor	Just Got Paid ft. French Montana	Brighter Days	
2018	Charli XCX	No Angel	Focus/No Angel	
2018	Mako	Murder		
2018	Charli XCX	5 In The Morning		
2018	Russo	Lonely, Ghost, Loudmouth, Joyride	House With A Pool EP	
2018	Kara Marni	Love Just Ain't Enough, Golden, Curve, All Or Nothing, Gullible, L Word	Love Just Ain't Enough EP	
2017	Lil Peep	Save That Shit, Awful Things (feat. Lil Tracy), U Said, Better Off (Dying), The Brightside, Problems	Come Over When You're Sober, Pt. 1	as IIVI
2017	Anne-Marie	Heavy	Speak Your Mind	
2017	Kara Marni	Golden		
2017	Bebe Rexha	Gateway Drug	All Your Fault pt. 1	
2016	Jonas Blue ft. Raye	By Your Side		200m+ streams #15 (UK) Silver
2016	Liam Bailey	Love My Neighbour		
2016	Charles Hamilton	Oh Well, Clowns, Everyone, Correct, Be With You, Make Yourself Over, MVP, Only Christina Knows, Real Life, Ugly Supermodel	Hamilton, Charles	
2016	Bebe Rexha ft. Nicki Minaj	No Broken Hearts		290m+ streams & YouTube views #30 (US Mainstream Top 40) (Billboard)
2016	Zayn	Mind of Mine (Intro), Wrong (ft. Kehlani), Fool For You, Truth, Lucozade, Like I Would, She Don't Love Me, Golden (as XYZ)	Mind of Mine	#1 Argentine Albums (CAPIF) #1 Australian Albums (ARIA) #1 Canadian Albums (Billboard) #1 Czech Albums (ČNS IFPI) #1 French Albums (SNEP) #1 Hungarian Albums (Mahasz) #1 Italian Albums (FIMI) #1 Mexican Albums (AMPROFON) #1 New Zealand Albums (RMNZ) #1 Portuguese Albums (AFP) #1 Spanish Albums (PROMUSICAE) #1 Swedish Albums (Sverigetopplistan) #1 Swiss Albums (Schweizer Hitparade) #1 Taiwanese Albums (Five Music) #1 UK Albums (OCC) #1 UK R&B Albums (OCC) #1 US Billboard 200
2016	Zayn	Like I Would		150m+ streams Gold (Canada) Gold (Australia) Gold (Sweden) Silver (UK)
2016	All Saints	Fear	Red Flag	#3 (UK)
2016	Sigala ft. Imani and DJ Fresh	Say You Do		#5 (UK) Gold
2016	Travis Mills	Hangover	While You Wait EP	
2015	Britney Spears & Iggy Azalea	Pretty Girls		#1 (US Billboard Hot Dance Club Songs) #5 (Spain PROMUSICAE) #5 (Sweden Digital Songs DigiListan) #6 (Greece Digital Songs (Billboard)) #11 (Hungary Association of Hungarian Record Companies) #16 (Canada Hot 100) #16 (UK) #16 (Finland The Official Finnish Charts) #25 (France SNEP) #29 (US Billboard Hot 100)
2015	Charles Hamilton	Face The Music, Crayola, Lessons (ft. Sam Bruno)	Black Box EP	
2015	Charles Hamilton	New York Raining (ft. Rita Ora)		#29 (UK)
2015	Liam Bailey	Stun Me, Battle Hymn of Central London	Definitely Now	
2015	Iggy Azalea	Trouble (feat. Jennifer Hudson)		#7 (UK) Gold #10 Australia (ARIA) Platinum #34 US Mainstream Top 40 (Billboard) Gold #67 (US Billboard Hot 100)
2014	Iggy Azalea	Beg for It (feat. MØ)		#3 (US Billboard Hot Dance Club Songs) #11 US Mainstream Top 40 (Billboard) #27 (US Billboard Hot 100) Platinum #29 (Australia)
2014	Iggy Azalea	Fancy (feat. Charli XCX)		#1 (US Billboard Hot 100) 7× Platinum #1 (New Zealand) 2× Platinum #1 (Canada) 4× Platinum #5 (UK) Platinum #5 (Australia) 4× Platinum
2014	Iggy Azalea	Work, Fancy (ft. Charli XCX), Impossible Is Nothing, Goddess, Walk The Line, New Chick, Don't Need Y'all, Lady Patra, F Love, Rolex, Just Asking, We In This Bitch, Beg For It (featuring Charli XCX/MØ), Trouble (featuring Jennifer Hudson), Iggy Szn, Heavy Crown (featuring Ellie Goulding)	The New Classic / Reclassified	#1 US Billboard (Top R&B/Hip-Hop Albums) #1 US Billboard (Top Rap Albums) #3 US (Billboard 200) Platinum #2 (Australia ARIA Charts) Gold #2 (Canadian Albums Chart) Gold #3 NZ (Official New Zealand Music Chart) #5 (UK)
2014	Cheryl Cole	It's About Time	Only Human	#7 (UK)
2014	Lower Than Atlantis	Emily, Words Don't Come So Easily, Just What You Need	Lower Than Atlantis	#16 (UK)
2014	Bright Light Bright Light	I Believe, In Your Care, Too Much, Happiness	Life is Easy	#19 UK Indie Chart
2014	Dominique Young Unique	Throw It Down		
2014	Katy B	Next Thing	Little Red (album)	#1 (UK)
2014	Dan Croll	Wanna Know	Sweet Disarray	#26 (UK)
2014	DJ Fresh vs. Jay Fay	Dibby Dibby Sound (feat. Ms. Dynamite)		#3 (UK)
2013	Iggy Azalea	Work		#5 (US Billboard Hot Dance Club Songs) #54 (US Billboard Hot 100) Platinum #17 (UK) Silver #87 (Canada) Gold #79 (Australia) Gold
2013	Ellie Goulding	Flashlight	Halcyon Days	#1 (UK) 2× Platinum
2013	Conor Maynard	Animal (feat. Wiley)		#6 (UK)
2012	DJ Fresh	Hot Right Now (feat. Rita Ora)		#1 (UK) Platinum
2012	DJ Fresh	The Feeling		#13 (UK)
2012	DJ Fresh	The Power (feat. Dizzee Rascal)		#6 (UK)
2012	DJ Fresh	Hot Right Now, The Power, The Feeling, Skyhighatrist, Forever More, Don't Tell Me, Fire Over Water	Nextlevelism	#14 (UK)
2012	Conor Maynard	Can't Say No		#2 (UK) Silver
2012	Conor Maynard	Can't Say No, Vegas Girl, Animal, Take Off, Mary Go Round, Headphones, Better Than You	Contrast	#1 (UK) Silver
2012	Conor Maynard	Vegas Girl		#4 (UK)
2012	Coldplay	Princess of China (feat. Rihanna) (Invisible Men Remix)		
2012	Bright Light Bright Light	Feel It, Waiting for the Feeling, Moves	Make Me Believe in Hope	
2012	Girls Aloud	On the Metro	Ten	#9 (UK) Gold
2012	Jessie J	LaserLight (feat. David Guetta)		#5 (UK) Silver
2011	David Guetta	Repeat feat. Jessie J	Nothing but the Beat	Platinum (Australia) 2× Platinum (Austria) Platinum (Belgium) 2× Platinum (Canada) Diamond (France) Platinum (Ireland) Platinum (Mexico) Platinum (Spain) 2× Platinum (UK) Platinum (Europe) (IFPI)
2011	Jessie J	Who's Laughing Now		#16 (UK) Silver
2011	Jessie J	Do It Like A Dude		#2 (UK) Platinum
2011	Jessie J	Do It Like A Dude, Who's Laughing Now, LaserLight, My Shadow	Who You Are	#2 (UK) 4× Platinum
2011	Pixie Lott	Birthday	Young Foolish Happy	#18 (UK) Gold
2011	Nicola Roberts	Say It Out Loud, Take a Bite	Cinderella's Eyes	#17 (UK)
2010	Gabriella Cilmi	On A Mission		#9 (UK)
2010	Gabriella Cilmi	On a Mission, What If You Knew, Love Me Cos You Want To, Defender, Robots, Invisible Girl, Let Me Know, Sucker For Love	Ten	
2010	I Blame Coco	Quicker	The Constant	
2010	Olly Murs	Love Shine Down, This One's For The Girls, Sophie	Olly Murs	#2 (UK) 2× Platinum
2009	Noisettes	Every Now And Then		
2009	Noisettes	Never Forget You		#20 (UK)
2009	Noisettes	Don't Upset The Rhythm		#2 (UK)
2009	Noisettes	Never Forget You, Don't Upset The Rhythm, Saturday Night, Every Now And Then, 24 Hours	Wild Young Hearts	#7 (UK) Gold
2009	V V Brown	Game Over		
2009	V V Brown	Bottles	Travelling Like the Light	#30 (UK)
2008	Sugababes	No Can Do		#23 (UK)
2008	Sugababes	No Can Do, Nothing's As Good As You, Hanging On A Star	Catfights and Spotlights	#8 (UK) Silver
2008	Sugababes	Denial		#15 (UK)
2008	Gabriella Cilmi	Round & Round	Lessons to Be Learned: Deluxe Edition	#8 (UK)
2007	Orson	Ain't No Party		#21 (UK)
2007	Sugababes	Denial, Undignified	Change	#1 (UK) Platinum
2006	Sugababes	Easy, Good To Be Gone		#3 (UK) Platinum
2005	Orson	Happiness		#27 (UK)
2005	Orson	Bright Idea		#11 (UK)
2005	Orson	No Tomorrow		#1 (UK) Silver
2004	Girls Aloud	The Show	What Will The Neighbours Say?	#2 (UK)
