= Marcus Butler =

English YouTuber and model (born 1991)

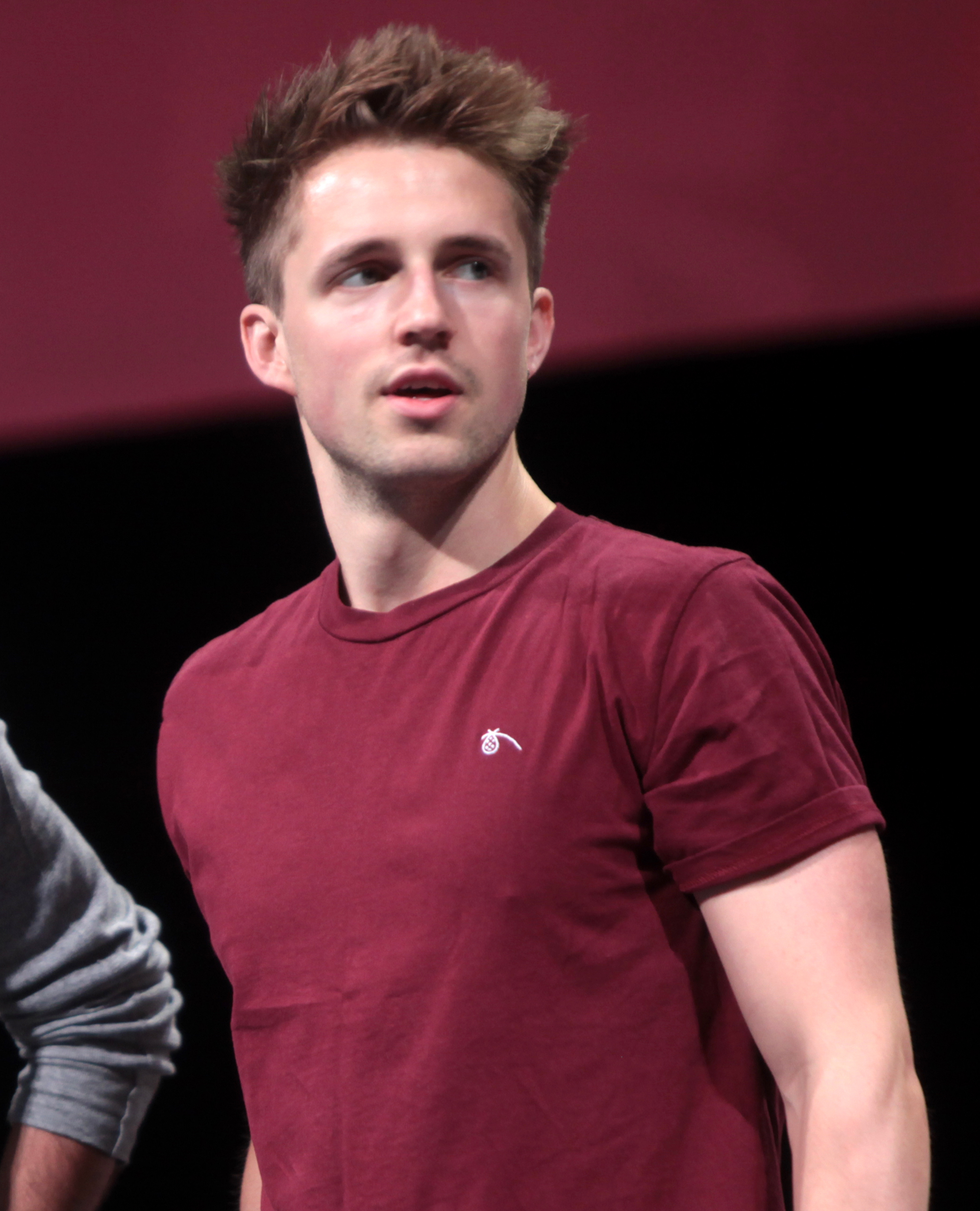
- Butler in 2014
- Born: Marcus Lloyd Butler; 18 December 1991 (age 34); Shoreham-by-Sea, England
- Occupations: YouTuber; model

YouTube information
- Channel: MarcusButlerTV
- Years active: 2010–2018
- Genres: Vlogging; comedy; lifestyle
- Subscribers: 3.76 million
- Views: 269 million
- Last updated: 2 January 2026

Marcus Lloyd Butler (born 18 December 1991) is an English model and former YouTuber, whose channels have reached over 5.4 million subscribers. In 2015, he released an autobiographical book, titled Hello Life!. Butler co-hosted a radio show with fellow YouTuber Alfie Deyes on BBC Radio 1.

== Career ==
Butler was educated at the independent Shoreham College. Butler began his career on YouTube creating music and video mixes and edited sports footage while in college.

In 2010, he created his YouTube channel, Marcus Butler TV, at viewer request. Butler has been involved in a number of collaborations with other YouTubers, including: Jim Chapman, Alfie Deyes, Caspar Lee, Tyler Oakley, Joe Sugg, Zoe Sugg, Connor Franta, Lilly Singh, Troye Sivan, Joey Graceffa, Louise Pentland, Conor Maynard and many others.

Butler's book, Hello Life, which is part autobiography and part self-help book, was published on 28 July 2015 in the UK and in the US on 10 November 2015.

As of February 2019, Butler's main YouTube channel has over 4.3 million subscribers and over 209 million video views. His second channel "Just Marcus" has 1.9 million subscribers and over 180 million video views.

Butler was mentioned by The Telegraph as one of "Britain's most influential Tweeters" in 2013. As of February 2019, Butler has over 3.3 million followers on Twitter and over 3.4 million on Instagram.

=== Television ===
Alongside fellow YouTubers Joe Sugg and Alfie Deyes, Butler starred in an episode of the British television show Release the Hounds. Their episode aired on 2 March 2017. He also starred in many episodes of Saturday Night Takeaway alongside Deyes. Also in 2016, Butler was a contestant on Celebrity MasterChef, but got eliminated in the quarterfinals. In 2017, Butler appeared on Good Morning Britain alongside fellow YouTuber Louise Pentland, giving tips on how to become a successful YouTuber.

== Other ventures ==
In 2022, Butler signed up to content subscription service OnlyFans. As of 2025, Butler has been living in Berlin for years, where he operates his own clothing brand Ante with two friends.

== Music ==
Butler was part of a "YouTube Boyband", a group involving Jim Chapman, Alfie Deyes, Joe Sugg, and Caspar Lee that raised money and awareness for Comic Relief. On 22 January 2016, Butler released a song with Conor Maynard called "I'm Famous". It entered the UK Singles Chart on 29 January 2016 at number 85.

=== Singles ===
Title	Year	Peak chart positions
Title	Year	UK
"I'm Famous" (featuring Conor Maynard)	2016	85
