= R U Crazy =

Single by Conor Maynard
- Released: 4 October 2013
- Recorded: 2013
- Genre: Pop; electronic; synth-pop
- Length: 4:13
- Label: Parlophone
- Songwriter(s): Conor Maynard; Timothy McKenzie; Ashton Foster; Ray Djan
- Producer(s): Labrinth

Conor Maynard singles chronology
"Animal" (2013)	"R U Crazy" (2013)	"Talking About" (2015)

"R U Crazy" a single by English singer-songwriter Conor Maynard. It was released on 4 October 2013. The song was written by Maynard, Eagle Eye, and Labrinth, who also produced the song. Labrinth also provided a remix of the song, which premiered on the BBC Radio 1 Review Show on 17 September 2013.

== Background ==
The song was premiered on radio on 26 August, with the accompanying music video being released later that day. Maynard has said that he's "grown up a bit since the first album" and that "the music is going to be slightly different." The music video is for an older viewer compared to his past videos.

== Track listings ==
Digital download - single
No.	Title	Length
1.	"R U Crazy" (Radio Edit)	3:27

Digital download - EP
No.	Title	Length
1.	"R U Crazy"	4:13
2.	"R U Crazy" (Raf Riley Remix)	3:47
3.	"R U Crazy" (DJ Joachim Remix)	4:30
4.	"R U Crazy" (Horror Stories Remix)	3:07
5.	"R U Crazy" (Jason Julian Remix)	3:59

R U Crazy (Lab's Swing Version)
No.	Title	Length
1.	"R U Crazy" (Lab's Swing Version)	2:53

Digital download - acoustic
No.	Title	Length
1.	"R U Crazy" (Acoustic live version)	2:42

== Charts ==
=== Weekly charts ===
Chart (2013)	Peak position
Ireland (IRMA)	18
Scotland (OCC)	5
UK Singles (OCC)	4

=== Year-end charts ===
Chart (2013)	Position
UK Singles (OCC)	107

== Certifications ==
Region	Certification	Certified units/sales
United Kingdom (BPI)	Gold	400,000^{‡}
^{‡} Sales+streaming figures based on certification alone.

== Release history ==
Region	Date	Format	Label
Ireland	4 October 2013	Digital download	Parlophone
United Kingdom	6 October 2013	Digital download	Parlophone
