= Are You Sure? (Kris Kross Amsterdam song) =

Single by Kris Kross Amsterdam and Conor Maynard featuring Ty Dolla Sign
- Released: 23 December 2016
- Recorded: 2016
- Genre: Dance-pop; tropical house
- Length: 3:14
- Label: Spinnin' Records; Parlophone
- Songwriter(s): Jordy Huisman, Sander Huisman, Diederik Van Elsas, Parrish Warrington, Kimberley Anne, Joren Van Der Voort, Tyrone Griffin Jr
- Producer(s): Kris Kross Amsterdam, Trackside, Joren Van Der Voort

Kris Kross Amsterdam singles chronology
"Sex" (2016)	"Are You Sure?" (2016)

Conor Maynard singles chronology
"Catch Me Here" (2016)	"Are You Sure?" (2016)	"Understand Me" (2017)

Ty Dolla Sign singles chronology
"What You Like" (2016)	"Are You Sure?" (2016)	"I Think She Like Me" (2017)

"Are You Sure?" is a song by Dutch DJ and record producer trio Kris Kross Amsterdam and English singer-songwriter Conor Maynard, featuring vocals from American singer, rapper, songwriter and record producer Ty Dolla Sign. The song samples "Who Do You Love" by American musician Bernard Wright. The song was released as a digital download on 23 December 2016 through Spinnin' Records and Parlophone.

== Track listing ==
Digital download
No.	Title	Length
1.	"Are You Sure?" (featuring Ty Dolla $ign)	3:14

== Charts ==
=== Weekly charts ===
Chart (2017)	Peak position
Belgium Dance (Ultratop Flanders)	23
Belgium Dance (Ultratop Wallonia)	42
Netherlands (Dutch Top 40)	15
Netherlands (Single Top 100)	25
Hungary (Rádiós Top 40)	25
Scotland (OCC)	99
UK Download (Official Charts Company)	94
US Hot Dance/Electronic Songs (Billboard)	37

=== Year-end charts ===
Chart (2017)	Position
Netherlands (Dutch Top 40)	86

== Release history ==
Region	Date	Format	Label
United Kingdom	23 December 2016	Digital download	Spinnin' Records; Parlophone
