= Talking About =

2015 song by Conor Maynard

Single by Conor Maynard
- Released: 2 March 2015
- Genre: House
- Length: 3:17
- Label: Parlophone
- Songwriter(s): David, Coffer, McDowell, Ibrahim, Omer, Murray

Conor Maynard singles chronology
"R U Crazy" (2013)	"Talking About" (2015)	"Royalty" (2015)

"Talking About" is a song by English singer-songwriter Conor Maynard. The song was released in the United Kingdom as a digital download on 2 March 2015 through Parlophone. The song has peaked at number 44 on the UK Singles Chart.

== Music video ==
A music video to accompany the release of "Talking About" was first released onto YouTube on 1 March 2015 at a total length of three minutes and twenty-two seconds.

== Track listing ==
Digital download - Single
No.	Title	Length
1.	"Talking About"	3:17

Digital download - EP
No.	Title	Length
1.	"Talking About"	3:17
2.	"Talking About" (Architechs Remix)	4:20
3.	"Talking About" (Kokiri Remix)	6:33
4.	"Talking About" (DE$iGNATED Remix)	4:49
5.	"Talking About" (LiTek Remix)	4:42

Digital download
No.	Title	Length
1.	"Talking About" (Acoustic Version)	2:17

== Chart performance ==
=== Weekly charts ===
Chart (2015)	Peak position
Scotland (OCC)	33
UK Singles (OCC)	44

== Release history ==
Region	Date	Format	Label
United Kingdom	2 March 2015	Digital download	Parlophone
