= I'm Famous =

Single by Marcus Butler featuring Conor Maynard
- Released: 22 January 2016
- Genre: Pop; hip hop
- Length: 3:26
- Label: Self-released
- Songwriter(s): Marcus Butler; Brett McLaughlin

Marcus Butler singles chronology
"I'm a Rapper" (2013)	"I'm Famous" (2016)

Conor Maynard singles chronology
"Royalty" (2015)	"I'm Famous" (2016)	"Dancing in the Headlights" (2016)

"I'm Famous" is a song by British YouTuber Marcus Butler and British singer Conor Maynard. It was released in the United Kingdom as a digital download on 22 January 2016. on 22 January 2016. The single was a minor success on the UK Singles Chart reaching number 85 for one week. The music video of the song has been released onto Marcus Butler's YouTube channel. The music video for the song has nearly 5 million views.

== Composition ==
"I'm Famous" was written by Marcus himself and Brett McLaughlin, who wrote and sang chorus part of Marcus's previous song "I'm a Rapper". This song features British singer Conor Maynard, who has number 1 album and 5 Top 10 songs in the UK during 2012 and 2013.

== Credits and Personnel ==
- Marcus Butler – songwriting, vocals
- Brett McLaughlin – songwriting
- Conor Maynard – vocals

== Chart performance ==
=== Weekly charts ===
Chart (2016)	Peak position
UK Singles (OCC)	85

== Release history ==
Region	Date	Format	Label
United Kingdom	22 January 2016	Digital download	Self-released
United Kingdom	22 January 2016	Streaming	Self-released
