= Sex (Cheat Codes and Kris Kross Amsterdam song) =

Single by Cheat Codes and Kris Kross Amsterdam
- Released: February 19, 2016
- Recorded: January 2016
- Genre: Tropical house
- Length: 3:48
- Label: Spinnin'; Casablanca
- Songwriters: Hurby Azor; Bearclvw; Trevor Dahl; Matthew Russell; Jordy Huisman; Sander Huisman; Kevin Pederson; Cimo Fränkel; Rik Annema
- Producers: Cheat Codes; Kris Kross Amsterdam; BEARCLVW

Cheat Codes singles chronology
"Say Goodbye" (2016)	"Sex" (2016)	"Fed Up" (2016)

Kris Kross Amsterdam singles chronology
"Until the Morning" (2015)	"Sex" (2016)	"Are You Sure?" (2016)

"Sex" is a song by American DJ trio Cheat Codes and Dutch DJ trio Kris Kross Amsterdam. The song was released by Spinnin' Records on February 19, 2016, and has since achieved international success.

== Composition and release ==
The song re-uses the chorus from the 1991 single "Let's Talk About Sex" by hip hop trio Salt-N-Pepa. It is set in the key of A minor and has a tempo of 105 beats per minute.

The song was first released by Spinnin' Records on February 19, 2016. This was followed by a release as a digital download to Beatport on April 8, 2016, and a release to the iTunes Store by Casablanca Records on May 26, 2016.

== Music video ==
The song's music video was released to the Spinnin' Records YouTube channel on February 19, 2016. Directed by Chris Campbell, it features Cheat Codes and Kris Kross Amsterdam in a sex education class. As of January 2024, the video has received over 210 million views.

== Track listing ==
Digital download
No.	Title	Length
1.	"Sex"	3:48
2.	"Sex" (Extended Mix)	5:15

Remixes EP
No.	Title	Length
1.	"Sex" (Hasse de Moor Remix)	3:00
2.	"Sex" (TV Noise Remix)	3:44
3.	"Sex" (TWRK and Doobious Remix)	3:26
4.	"Sex" (Gregor Salto Remix)	4:20
5.	"Sex" (Kwint Remix)	3:58
6.	"Sex" (Carta Remix)	4:25
7.	"Sex" (Jasper Dietze Remix)	3:49
8.	"Sex" (Drianu Remix)	3:43

== Charts ==
=== Weekly charts ===
Chart (2016)	Peak position
Australia (ARIA)	17
Austria (Ö3 Austria Top 40)	19
Belgium (Ultratop 50 Flanders)	25
Belgium (Ultratop 50 Wallonia)	30
Denmark (Tracklisten)	3
Finland (Suomen virallinen lista)	3
France (SNEP)	124
Germany (GfK)	14
Hungary (Stream Top 40)	15
Ireland (IRMA)	9
Italy (FIMI)	37
Latvia (Latvijas Top 40)	3
Netherlands (Dutch Top 40)	2
Netherlands (Single Top 100)	2
New Zealand (Recorded Music NZ)	24
Norway (VG-lista)	2
Portugal (AFP)	24
Slovakia Airplay (ČNS IFPI)	91
Spain (Promusicae)	53
Sweden (Sverigetopplistan)	2
Switzerland (Schweizer Hitparade)	27
UK Singles (OCC)	9
US Bubbling Under Hot 100 (Billboard)	15
US Hot Dance/Electronic Songs (Billboard)	10

=== Year-end charts ===
Chart (2016)	Position
Australia (ARIA)	84
Austria (Ö3 Austria Top 40)	59
Belgium (Ultratop Flanders)	81
Denmark (Tracklisten)	17
France (SNEP)	123
Germany (Official German Charts)	45
Netherlands (Dutch Top 40)	29
Netherlands (Single Top 100)	15
Sweden (Sverigetopplistan)	14
Switzerland (Schweizer Hitparade)	76
UK Singles (Official Charts Company)	52
US Hot Dance/Electronic Songs (Billboard)	28

== Certifications ==
Region	Certification	Certified units/sales
Australia (ARIA)	2× Platinum	140,000^{‡}
Belgium (BRMA)	Gold	10,000^{‡}
Brazil (Pro-Música Brasil)	Platinum	60,000^{‡}
Denmark (IFPI Danmark)	2× Platinum	180,000^{‡}
France (SNEP)	Platinum	133,333^{‡}
Germany (BVMI)	3× Gold	600,000^{‡}
Italy (FIMI)	Platinum	50,000^{‡}
New Zealand (RMNZ)	Platinum	30,000^{‡}
Norway (IFPI Norway)	3× Platinum	120,000^{‡}
Spain (Promusicae)	Gold	20,000^{‡}
Sweden (GLF)	4× Platinum	160,000^{‡}
United Kingdom (BPI)	Platinum	600,000^{‡}
United States (RIAA)	Gold	500,000^{‡}
^{‡} Sales+streaming figures based on certification alone.
