= Turn Around (Conor Maynard song) =

2012 single by Conor Maynard

Single by Conor Maynard featuring Ne-Yo

from the album Contrast
- Released: 11 October 2012
- Recorded: 2012
- Genre: Synth-pop; dance-pop
- Length: 3:52
- Label: Parlophone
- Songwriters: Shaffer Smith; Benjamin Levin; Mikkel S. Eriksen; Tor Erik Hermansen
- Producers: Stargate; Benny Blanco

Conor Maynard singles chronology
"Vegas Girl" (2012)	"Turn Around" (2012)	"Animal" (2013)

Ne-Yo singles chronology
"Let Me Love You (Until You Learn to Love Yourself)" (2012)	"Turn Around" (2012)	"Don't Make Em Like You" (2012)

"Turn Around" is a song by British singer Conor Maynard from his debut studio album, Contrast. The song features vocals from American singer Ne-Yo. It was released as the album's third single as a digital download on 11 October 2012. The song was produced by Stargate and Benny Blanco, who also co-wrote it with Ne-Yo. This is another collaboration between StarGate and Benny Blanco, following such songs as Wiz Khalifa's "Work Hard, Play Hard" and Rihanna's "Diamonds".

== Music video ==
A music video to accompany the release of "Turn Around" was first released onto YouTube on 9 September 2012 at a total length of four minutes and three seconds and Britt Nilsson appear in the clip. It was filmed in Los Angeles, California, and was directed by Colin Tilley.

== Critical reception ==
Lewis Corner of Digital Spy gave the song a positive review stating:

"Turn around, open your eyes/ Look at me now/ Turn around, girl I've got you/ We won't fall down," he promises his (hopefully more appreciative) new beau over a mix of euphoric Italo piano riffs and pacing house beats, all worthy of the air-grabbing displayed in the accompanying music video. With mentor and pal Ne-Yo joining him on the track and another pop hit to add to his blossoming collection, we're sure being ditched over the internet will safely remain in Conor's past..

== Track listing ==
Digital download
No.	Title	Length
1.	"Turn Around"	3:53

Digital Remixes EP
No.	Title	Length
1.	"Turn Around"	3:53
2.	"Turn Around (DADA Edit)"	3:52
3.	"Turn Around (Dave Aude Radio)"	4:05
4.	"Turn Around (Marc MacRowland Remix)"	5:02
5.	"Turn Around (The Arcade Remix)"	3:59
6.	"Starships (BBC Live Version)"	3:22

== Credits and personnel ==
- Lead vocals – Conor Maynard, NeYo
- Producers – Stargate, Benny Blanco, Plan J
- Lyrics – Mikkel S. Eriksen, Tor Erik Hermansen, Benjamin Levin, Shaffer Smith
- Label: Parlophone

== Chart performance ==
=== Weekly charts ===
Chart (2012–13)	Peak position
Australia (ARIA)	43
Belgium (Ultratop 50 Flanders)	26
Belgium (Ultratip Bubbling Under Wallonia)	18
Denmark (Tracklisten)	33
France (SNEP)	52
Germany (GfK)	76
Hungary (Rádiós Top 40)	1
Ireland (IRMA)	14
Japan (Billboard Japan Hot 100)	17
Netherlands (Dutch Top 40)	15
Netherlands (Single Top 100)	20
New Zealand (Recorded Music NZ)	28
Scotland Singles (OCC)	9
Slovakia (Rádio Top 100)	23
Spain (Spanish Airplay Chart)	18
UK Singles (OCC)	8
US Bubbling Under Hot 100 (Billboard)	10
US Dance Club Songs (Billboard)	7
US Pop Airplay (Billboard)	32

=== Year-end charts ===
Chart (2012)	Position
Netherlands (Dutch Top 40)	95
UK Singles (Official Charts Company)	99
Chart (2013)	Position
Hungary (Rádiós Top 40)	23
Netherlands (Dutch Top 40)	147

== Certifications ==
Region	Certification	Certified units/sales
Australia (ARIA)	Gold	35,000^{^}
New Zealand (RMNZ)	Gold	7,500^{*}
United Kingdom (BPI)	Gold	400,000^{‡}
Streaming
Denmark (IFPI Danmark)	Gold	900,000^{†}
^{*} Sales figures based on certification alone.^{^} Shipments figures based on certification alone.^{‡} Sales+streaming figures based on certification alone.^{†} Streaming-only figures based on certification alone.

== Release history ==
Region	Date	Format	Label
United Kingdom	11 October 2012	Digital download	Parlophone
United States	30 October 2012	Top 40 radio	Capitol Records
