= Vegas Girl =

2012 single by Conor Maynard

Single by Conor Maynard

from the album Contrast
- Released: 22 July 2012
- Recorded: 2011
- Genre: Synthpop
- Length: 2:49
- Label: Parlophone
- Songwriters: Conor Maynard; The Invisible Men; Parker & James; Dion Wardle; Scott Thomas
- Producers: The Invisible Men; Parker & James

Conor Maynard singles chronology
"Can't Say No" (2012)	"Vegas Girl" (2012)	"Turn Around" (2012)

"Vegas Girl" is a song by British singer Conor Maynard from his debut studio album, Contrast. It was released as the album's second single as a digital download on 22 July 2012. The song was written and produced by The Invisible Men with additional production from Parker & James and was also written by Conor Maynard, Dion Wardle and Scott Thomas. It was also viewed on MTV Push.

== Music video ==
A music video to accompany the release of "Vegas Girl" was first released onto YouTube on 24 June 2012 at a total length of three minutes and forty seconds. Filmed in New York, the video was directed by Travis Kopach.

It begins with Maynard meeting a girl who is wearing a T-shirt that reads "Vegas Girl" he takes a picture of her and tweets it asking his followers if they have seen her throughout the videos various females wearing the same T-shirt are shown.

The song also features a sampling of A.R. Rahman’s track ‘Urvasi Urvasi’ from the 1994 hit Tamil movie ‘Kadhalan’.

== Critical reception ==
Robert Copsey of Digital Spy gave the song a positive review stating:

"I'll knock you down like you're Keri/ Forget your name like Rihanna," he insists over slick urban-light beats with a voice that will undoubtedly draw comparisons to Justin Timberlake. The obvious clichés are all present and correct ("Roll the dice, I've got your number/ Hit the jackpot underneath the cover"), but he gets away with it, if only for his homage halfway through to Tequila, Tequila Tequila....

== Track listing ==
Digital download
No.	Title	Length
1.	"Vegas Girl"	2:51
2.	"Vegas Girl" (Wideboys Edit)	3:54
3.	"Vegas Girl" (Tortuga Remix)	4:07
4.	"Marvins Room"	3:32

== Chart performance ==
=== Weekly charts ===
Chart (2012–13)	Peak position
Australia (ARIA)	75
Belgium (Ultratip Bubbling Under Flanders)	7
Germany (GfK)	63
Ireland (IRMA)	22
Japan (Billboard Japan Hot 100)	17
Netherlands (Single Top 100)	55
Scotland Singles (OCC)	5
UK Singles (OCC)	4
US Bubbling Under Hot 100 (Billboard)	1
US Pop Airplay (Billboard)	27

=== Year-end charts ===
Chart (2012)	Position
UK Singles (OCC)	199

== Release history ==
Region	Date	Format	Label
United Kingdom	22 July 2012	Digital Download	Parlophone
United States	24 July 2012	Mainstream airplay	Capitol
