= Whenever (song) =

2018 song by Kris Kross Amsterdam and the Boy Next Door

Single by Kris Kross Amsterdam and the Boy Next Door featuring Conor Maynard
- Released: 22 June 2018
- Genre: Tropical house
- Length: 2:43
- Label: Virgin; Spinnin'
- Songwriters: Conor Maynard; Joren van der Voort; Robin P. Francesco; Bas van Daalen; Jordy Huisman; Sander Huisman; Lex van Berkel; Shakira; Tim Mitchell; Gloria Estefan

Kris Kross Amsterdam singles chronology
"Gone Is the Night" (2017)	"Whenever" (2018)	"Vámonos" (2018)

The Boy Next Door singles chronology
"La Colegiala" (2017)	"Whenever" (2018)

Conor Maynard singles chronology
"All My Love" (2017)	"Whenever" (2018)	"Hold on Tight" (2018)

"Whenever" is a song by Dutch DJs Kris Kross Amsterdam and the Boy Next Door released in 2018 featuring vocals by English singer Conor Maynard. The song, released by Virgin Records and Spinnin' Records, was a hit throughout Europe. It is an adaptation and rearrangement of the Shakira song "Whenever, Wherever" with new lyrics and new musical compositions. The refrain samples Shakira's release.

== Charts ==
=== Weekly charts ===
Chart (2018)	Peak position
Austria (Ö3 Austria Top 40)	56
Belgium (Ultratop 50 Flanders)	25
Belgium (Ultratip Bubbling Under Wallonia)	2
Denmark (Tracklisten)	22
Finland (Suomen virallinen lista)	15
France (SNEP)	120
Germany (GfK)	46
Netherlands (Dutch Top 40)	3
Netherlands (Single Top 100)	4
Norway (VG-lista)	19
Poland Airplay (ZPAV)	11
Poland (Video Chart)	1
Sweden (Sverigetopplistan)	8
Switzerland (Schweizer Hitparade)	68
UK Singles (Official Charts)	95
US Hot Dance/Electronic Songs (Billboard)	18

=== Year-end charts ===
Chart (2018)	Position
Netherlands (Dutch Top 40)	23
Netherlands (Single Top 100)	46
Sweden (Sverigetopplistan)	100
US Hot Dance/Electronic Songs (Billboard)	64

== Certifications ==
Region	Certification	Certified units/sales
Belgium (BRMA)	Gold	20,000^{‡}
Denmark (IFPI Danmark)	Platinum	90,000^{‡}
Germany (BVMI)	Gold	200,000^{‡}
Italy (FIMI)	Gold	35,000^{‡}
New Zealand (RMNZ)	Gold	15,000^{‡}
Poland (ZPAV)	Gold	25,000^{‡}
^{‡} Sales+streaming figures based on certification alone.
