= Contrast (Conor Maynard album) =

Studio album by Conor Maynard
- Released: 30 July 2012
- Recorded: 2011–2012
- Studios: Ealing Music Studio (West London, England)
- Genres: R&B; teen pop
- Length: 41:25
- Label: Parlophone
- Producers: Pharrell Williams; Stargate; Benny Blanco; The Invisible Men; Midi Mafia; Crada; Lucas Secon; Quiz & Larossi; Eagle Eye; The Arcade; Parker & James; DetoNate; Rami Afuni

Conor Maynard chronology
Contrast (2012)	Covers (2016)

Singles from Contrast
- 1. "Can't Say No" Released: 2 March 2012; 2. "Vegas Girl" Released: 22 July 2012; 3. "Turn Around" Released: 11 October 2012; 4. "Animal" Released: 20 January 2013

Contrast is the debut album by British pop singer Conor Maynard. It was released on 30 July 2012 in the United Kingdom through Parlophone and across Europe between August and October. Contrast mainly includes production from the Invisible Men, who produced seven of the fourteen songs available on the album, along with production from Pharrell Williams, Stargate, Benny Blanco, Midi Mafia, Crada, Lucas Secon, Quiz & Larossi, and Eagle Eye, among others, and features guest appearances from American recording artists Ne-Yo and Pharrell Williams, as well as British singer Rita Ora.

Contrast was recorded between 2011 and 2012 and its album's music consists of pop and R&B. The album's lead single "Can't Say No" entered the UK Singles Chart at number 2. The second single "Vegas Girl" was released the same day as Contrast, entering at number 4. Another two singles were released after the album release. The album peaked at number 1 on the UK Albums Chart, and charted in Austria, Belgium, Denmark, Germany, Ireland, the Netherlands, Switzerland, Italy and United States.

== Background ==
On 20 May 2006, Maynard signed up to online video-sharing website YouTube and in 2008 uploaded his very first video of him singing "Breathe" by fellow British musician Lee Carr. Throughout 2009–present, Maynard uploaded cover versions of songs with rapper and close friend, Anthony "Anth" Melo who resides in Virginia. Together they have covered a variety of songs, including: Chris Brown ("Crawl"), Taio Cruz ("Dynamite"), Rihanna ("Only Girl (In the World)"). Maynard was brought to label attention when American singer/songwriter Ne-Yo watched a cover version of his track "Beautiful Monster" – who contacted the musician soon afterwards, and Ne-Yo became Maynard's mentor.

In November 2011, Maynard received a nomination for MTV's Brand New for 2012 award, competing alongside Delilah, Michael Kiwanuka, Lana Del Rey and Lianne La Havas. It was announced on 31 January 2012 that Maynard had been crowned winner of the award, having received approximately 48% of the public vote.

Maynard had signed to Parlophone in 2010. He released the music video for his debut single "Can't Say No" on 1 March 2012, which by September 2012 had already surpassed fourteen million views. The single was met with positive reviews, with Lewis Corner (of Digital Spy) describing it as "playful, fun and immediately leaves you wanting another go", whilst others compared Maynard to Canadian singer Justin Bieber; both vocally and career-wise. However, Conor disputes this claim, saying "I'm not like Justin Bieber", and although insisting his music has a more mature R&B flavour to it than Bieber's, acknowledged that they both gained popularity from being young and from being found through YouTube.

== Singles ==
"Can't Say No" was released on 2 March 2012 as the first single from the album. It was produced by the Invisible Men and the Arcade, and written by the Invisible Men, Sophie Stern, Jon Mills, Joe Dyer, Kurtis McKenzie and Maynard. "Vegas Girl" was released on 20 July 2012 as the second single from the album. "Turn Around" was confirmed as the third single to be released from the album. The music video premiered on 10 September 2012 and was released on 8 October 2012.

"Animal" was confirmed to be the fourth single from the album. The music video was released on 10 December 2012 and was released to radio on 21 January 2013.

== Critical reception ==
Professional ratings
Aggregate scores
Source	Rating
Metacritic	67/100
Review scores
Source	Rating
AllMusic	3.5/5 stars
BBC Music	(Positive)
Digital Spy	3/5 stars
Drowned in Sound	7/10
The Guardian	3/5 stars
The Independent	3/5 stars
London Evening Standard	(Positive)
NME	7/10
Rolling Stone	3/5 stars
The Scotsman	(Positive)

Contrast received generally positive reviews from music critics. At Metacritic, which assigns a weighted mean rating out of 100 to reviews from mainstream critics, the album received an average score of 67 based on 11 reviews. Lewis Corner of Digital Spy criticized Maynard's lyrics for being "mismatch with his boy-next-door persona", ultimately stating the songs feel "like a by-product of his mentors rather than an expression of his teenage self." Corner also commented that the album's sound is more like Justin Timberlake as opposed to Justin Bieber, a common comparison for Maynard, specifically referring to the tracks "Can't Say No" and "Animal".

The Guardian, however, noted that the "British Justin Bieber" label fits Maynard as the album "follows the Bieber template of fitting a breathy teenage voice to cleancut urban pop." Nick Levine of BBC Music felt the album has "class" and complimented it for being a "credible collection of electronic RnB tracks." Levine also states Justin Timberlake's influence on Maynard, specifically referring to the song "Glass Girl" as being an "attempt to rewrite JT's Cry Me a River for the dubstep generation."

== Track listing ==
Contrast track listing
No.	Title	Writer(s)	Producer(s)	Length
1.	"Animal"	Conor Maynard; The Invisible Men; Sophie Stern; Kurtis McKenzie; Joey Dyer; Jon Mills	The Invisible Men; The Arcade	3:16
2.	"Turn Around" (featuring Ne-Yo)	Shaffer Smith; Benjamin Levin; Mikkel S. Eriksen; Tor Erik Hermansen	Stargate; Benny Blanco; Plan J	3:52
3.	"Vegas Girl"	Maynard; The Invisible Men; Scott Thomas; Peter Ighile; Kyle Abrahams; Dion Wardle	The Invisible Men; Parker & James	2:49
4.	"Can't Say No"	Maynard; The Invisible Men; Stern; McKenzie; Dyer; Mills	The Invisible Men	3:14
5.	"Lift Off" (featuring Pharrell Williams)	Maynard; Pharrell Williams	Pharrell Williams	2:59
6.	"Mary Go Round"	Maynard; The Invisible Men; Stern; Nathaniel Ledwidge	The Invisible Men; DetoNate	3:09
7.	"Take Off"	Maynard; The Invisible Men; Stern; McKenzie; Dyer; Mills	The Invisible Men; The Arcade	3:36
8.	"Better than You" (featuring Rita Ora)	Maynard; Rita Ora; The Invisible Men; Kurtis McKenzie; Dyer; Mills; Tony Nilsson; John Buchanan	The Invisible Men; The Arcade	3:13
9.	"Another One"	Maynard; Lucas Secon; Daniel Craddock; Quiz & Larossi; Josef Larossi; Andreas Romdhane	Quiz & Larossi; Lucas Secon	3:12
10.	"Pictures"	Kevin Risto; Waynne Nugent; Christopher Breaux	Midi Mafia	4:09
11.	"Glass Girl"	Maynard; Williams	Pharrell Williams	4:31
12.	"Just in Case"	Maynard; Ashton Foster; Ray Djan; Celetia Martin	Eagle Eye	3:17
Total length:				41:25

Japanese bonus tracks
No.	Title	Writer(s)	Producer(s)	Length
13.	"Headphones" (featuring Anth)	Maynard; Abrahams; Astasio; Shave; Nilsson; Rami Afuni; Anthony Melo	The Invisible Men; Rami Afuni	3:19
14.	"Drowning"	Christian Kalla; Christopher Jackson	Crada	3:18

iTunes bonus tracks
No.	Title	Writer(s)	Producer(s)	Length
13.	"Headphones" (featuring Anth)	Conor Maynard; Abrahams; Astasio; Shave; Nilsson; Afuni; Anthony Melo	The Invisible Men; Afuni	3:19
14.	"Drowning"	Christian Kalla; Jackson	Crada	3:18
15.	"Can't Say No" (music video)			3:14
16.	"Vegas Girl" (music video)			3:39
17.	"Conorcles: The Journey So Far" (video)			7:23

Target bonus tracks
No.	Title	Writer(s)	Producer(s)	Length
13.	"Headphones" (featuring Anth)	Maynard; Abrahams; Astasio; Shave; Nilsson; Afuni; Anthony Melo	The Invisible Men; Afuni	3:19
14.	"Drowning"	Christian Kalla; Jackson	Crada	3:18
15.	"Vegas Girl" (Wideboys Remix)	Maynard; The Invisible Men; Scott Thomas; Peter Ighile; Abrahams; Dion Wardle	The Invisible Men; Parker & James; Wideboys (add.)	3:54
16.	"Turn Around" (featuring Ne-Yo) (Dave Audé Mix)	Shaffer Smith; Benjamin Levin; Mikkel S. Eriksen; Erik Hermansen	Stargate; Benny Blanco; Plan J; Dave Audé (add.)	4:05
17.	"Can't Say No" (Lazy J Radio Edit)	Maynard; The Invisible Men; Stern; McKenzie; Dyer; Mills	The Invisible Men; Lazy J (add.)	2:59
18.	"Animal" (Wideboys Remix)	Maynard; The Invisible Men; Stern; McKenzie; Dyer; Mills	The Invisible Men; The Arcade; Wideboys (add.)	3:48
19.	"Animal" (featuring Wiley)	Maynard; The Invisible Men; Stern; McKenzie; Dyer; Mills	The Invisible Men; The Arcade	3:25

== Charts ==
Chart performance for Contrast
Chart (2012–2013)	Peak position
Australian Albums Chart	48
Austrian Albums Chart	72
Belgian Albums Chart (Flanders)	34
Belgian Albums Chart (Wallonia)	173
Canadian Albums Chart	10
Danish Albums Chart	37
Dutch Albums Chart	73
German Albums Chart	69
Irish Albums Chart	10
Italian Albums Chart	15
Japanese Albums Chart	130
New Zealand Albums Chart	27
Scottish Albums Chart	3
Swiss Albums Chart	40
UK Albums Chart	1
UK Album Downloads (Official Charts)	3
US Billboard 200	34

== Release history ==
Release history and formats for Contrast
Country	Release date	Format	Label
Germany	27 July 2012	CD, Digital download	EMI
Poland	30 July 2012	CD, Digital download	EMI
United Kingdom	30 July 2012	CD, Digital download	Parlophone
Philippines	3 August 2012	CD, Digital download	PolyEast (EMI)
Italy	18 September 2012	CD, Digital download	Capitol
Australia	21 September 2012	CD, Digital download	EMI
Brazil	10 October 2012	CD, Digital download	EMI
Japan	24 October 2012	CD, Digital download	EMI/SoundTown
United States	8 January 2013	CD, Digital download	Capitol

== See also ==
- List of 2012 albums
- List of UK Albums Chart number ones of the 2010s
