= The Boy Next Door (DJ) =

Dutch DJ and music producer

Lex van Berkel (born in Tilburg, the Netherlands), better known as The Boy Next Door also known as TBND, is a Dutch DJ and music producer. He gained fame through "La Colegiala" with Fresh Coast featuring vocals of Jody Bernal, a remake of the Walter León Aguilar hit. Also in 2017, he was featured as one of the promising DJs in the Dutch reality show The Next Icons. "La Colegiala" charted in the Netherlands and Sweden, shortly after which he signed a record deal with Spinnin' Records. His remake of Shakira's "Whenever, Wherever" titled "Whenever" with Kris Kross Amsterdam featuring the vocals of British singer Conor Maynard charted internationally and was certified platinum in the Netherlands.

== Discography ==
=== Singles ===
Title	Year	Peak positions											Album
Title	Year	NLD Dutch Top 40	NLD Single Top 100	BEL (Wa)	DEN	FRA	GER	NOR	SWE	SWI	UK	US Dance/El Songs	Album
"La Colegiala"	2017	5	26	Tip	—	—	—	—	75	—	—	—	
"Whenever"	2018	3	4	25	22	120	46	19	8	68	95	18	
