= Conor Maynard =

British singer (born 1992)

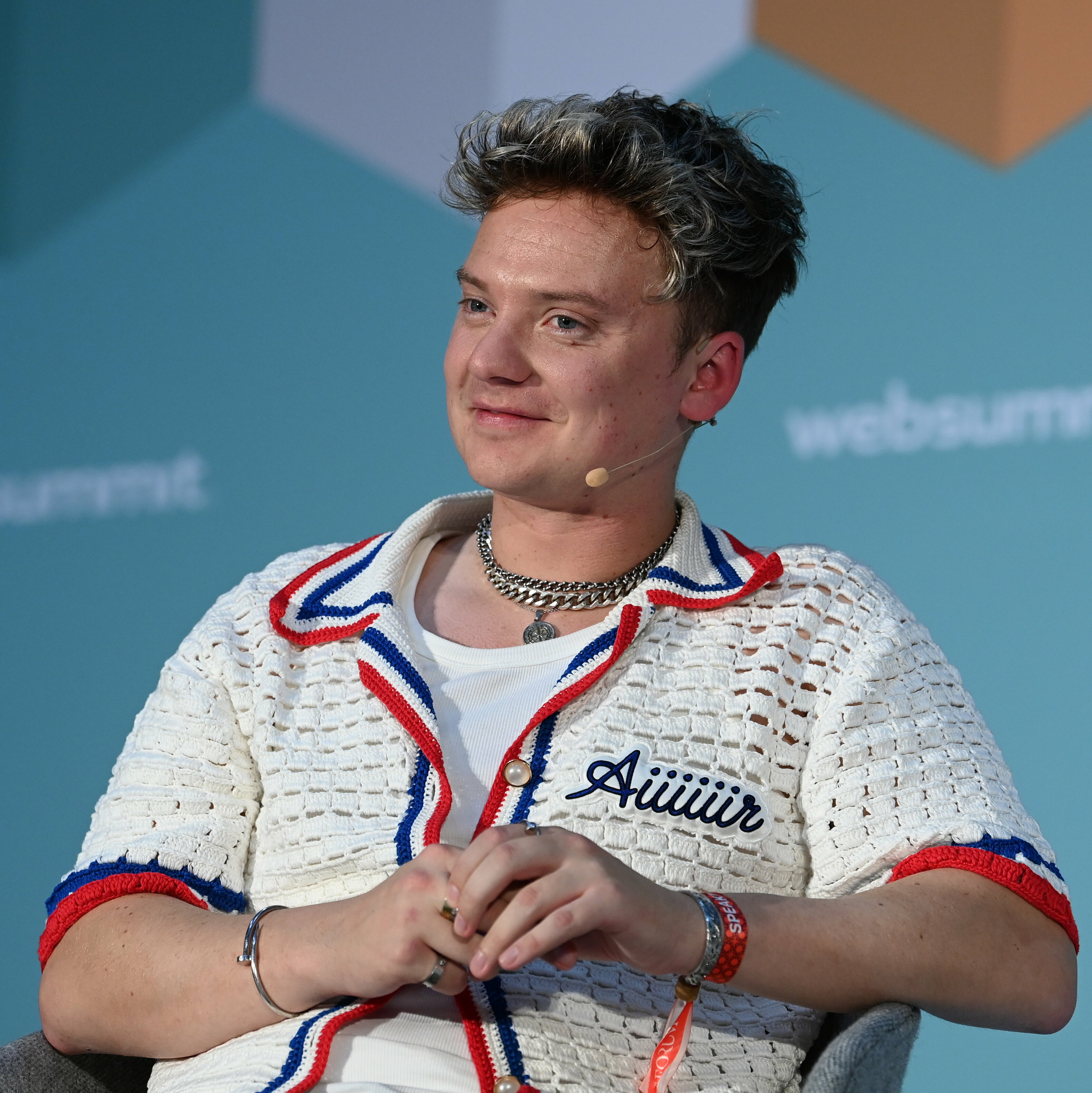
- Conor Maynard in 2022

Background information
- Born: Conor Paul Maynard; 21 November 1992 (age 33); Brighton, East Sussex, England
- Genres: R&B; pop; electropop
- Occupations: Singer; actor; YouTuber
- Instruments: Vocals; piano; keyboards
- Years active: 2006–present
- Labels: Parlophone; EMI; Capitol; Stmpd Rcrds; Spinnin'
- Spouse: Kitty Maynard (m. 2026)
- Website: conor-maynard.com

Conor Paul Maynard (born 21 November 1992) is an English singer. Born and raised in Brighton, he signed a recording contract with Warner Music Group in 2011. Maynard rose to fame in 2012 when he was nominated for, and subsequently won, MTV's Brand New for 2012 award. His debut album, Contrast, was released in July 2012 and produced the successful single "Can't Say No". Maynard released his second and third albums, Covers and +11 Hours, in 2016 and 2023, respectively.

== Early life ==
Conor Paul Maynard was born in Brighton, England to Gary and Helen Maynard, a builder and office worker, respectively. He has a younger brother, Jack who is a YouTuber. His younger sister Anna who is also a YouTuber has appeared in some of his covers on YouTube, including "Run" and "If I Were A Boy" and she was the host of Got What It Takes?. He attended Cardinal Newman Catholic School in Hove, East Sussex. On 19 May 2006, he signed up to the online video-sharing website YouTube and in December 2008 uploaded his very first video of him singing "Breathe", by fellow British musician Lee Carr. In 2006, Maynard starred as a young Casper Rose in the Sky 1 television series Dream Team.

== Career ==
=== 2010–2012: Debut ===
Maynard signed to Parlophone in late 2010. He released the music video for his debut single "Can't Say No" on 1 March 2012, which by September 2012 had already surpassed fourteen million views. The single was met with positive reviews, with Lewis Corner (of Digital Spy) describing it as "playful, fun and immediately leaves you wanting another go", while others compared Maynard to singer Justin Bieber. Maynard largely disputed this comparison, stating "I'm not like Justin Bieber", but allowed that both gained popularity from being young and from being found through YouTube.

Maynard's debut single, "Can't Say No", was released in the United Kingdom on 15 April 2012 – debuting at number two on the UK Singles Chart for the week ending 28 April with 74,792 copies sold. The track also saw chart success in Ireland, where it peaked at number thirteen. On 1 May, Maynard released the album track "Drowning" as a free download for any fans who pre-ordered the upcoming studio album Contrast. On 5 May, he performed "Can't Say No" at the 7th annual edition of the TRL Awards in Italy. On 9 June 2012, Maynard performed "Can't Say No" at the Capital Summertime Ball in front of an 80,000 strong crowd.

Maynard released his second single, "Vegas Girl", on 21 July 2012 in the UK – it debuted and peaked at number 4 on the UK Singles Chart. On 30 July, he released Contrast, which debuted at number 1 on the UK Album Chart on 11 August 2012. The album sold only 17,000 copies in its debut week. He released the third single from the album "Turn Around", featuring Ne-Yo. It peaked at number 8 on the UK singles chart. In November 2011, Maynard received a nomination for MTV's Brand New for 2012 award, competing alongside Delilah, Michael Kiwanuka, Lana Del Rey, and Lianne La Havas. It was announced on 31 January 2012 that Maynard had been crowned winner of the award, having received approximately 48% of the public vote.

=== 2013–2017: Take Off and Covers ===
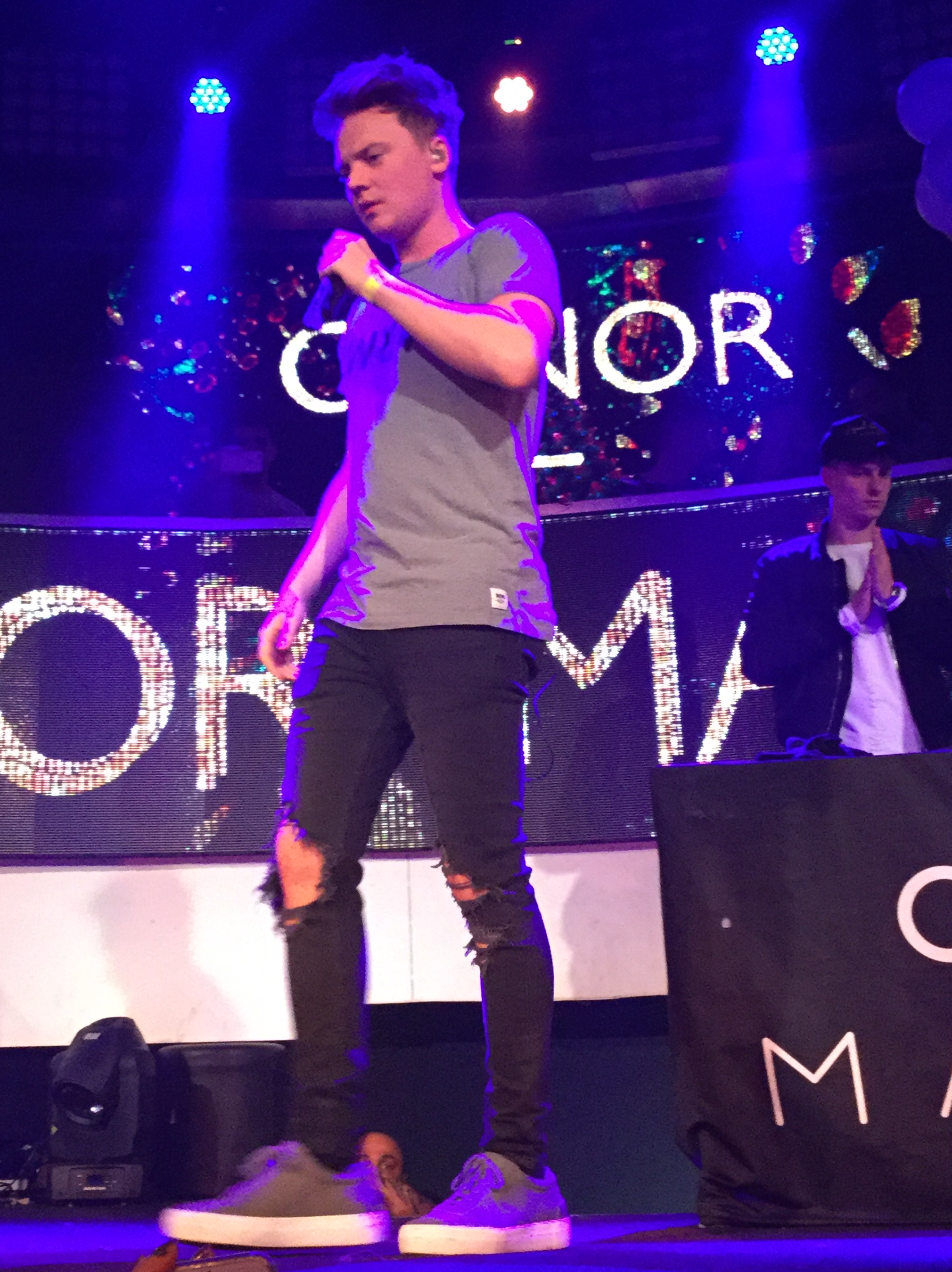
Maynard performing on 25 March 2017 in Rotterdam

It was revealed in June 2013 that Maynard would release a book offering fans an insight into his rise to fame, entitled Take Off; it was released in October 2013. He promised a new sound for the album and confirmed that he worked with Labrinth and Travie McCoy on the album.

On 23 August, Maynard confirmed that his new single would be called "R U Crazy", which was produced by Labrinth. The song premiered on radio on 25 August, as well as the music video appearing on 27 August.

In March 2014, Maynard took part in recording England's 2014 World Cup song. He collaborated with the likes of fellow pop stars Melanie C, Eliza Doolittle, Emma Bunton, Katy B, Kimberley Walsh, and Pixie Lott, on "Greatest Day", a track originally performed by a British band, Take That. The track was produced by Gary Barlow and recorded at Sarm Studios in London. The track also featured past footballers such as Gary Lineker, Michael Owen, Geoff Hurst, David Seaman, Peter Shilton, Glenn Hoddle, and Dion Dublin on backing vocals.

On 1 March 2015, Conor released his new single "Talking About", the second single from the upcoming album. The single debuted at number 44 on the UK Singles Chart, becoming not only Maynard's first single to miss the top-ten, but also his first to miss the top-forty altogether. Within a month Conor released his third single, "Royalty".

On 22 January 2016, the single "I'm Famous" by Marcus Butler was released featuring Maynard. It peaked at number 85 on the UK Singles Chart top 100, failing to reach the top 40. The single spent only one week on the chart. Maynard was also featured alongside Butler in the music video for the same song.

Conor performed at the Hertfordshire Summer Ball on 13 May 2016, along with other acts such as Becky Hill.

In July 2016, due to the success of his covers on YouTube, Conor announced he would be releasing an album of covers with one original track. A few of the covers included "Pillowtalk", "One Dance", "Hello" and "Stitches". The original was called "This Is My Version" and was written about a relationship he had previously been in. The album, Covers was released on 5 August 2016.

Maynard featured on a dance track called "Dancing in the Headlights" by DJ Antoine. Maynard also featured on a track called "Catch Me Here" by Drumsound and Bassline Smith which Conor had already written for 2 years. On 23 December 2016 he released the single "Are You Sure?" with Kris Kross Amsterdam featuring vocals from Ty Dolla Sign.

=== 2018–present: Broadway and +11 Hours ===
In November 2018, Maynard began starring in the Broadway production of Kinky Boots at the Al Hirschfeld Theatre in the lead role of Charlie Price and gave his final performance on 10 January 2019.

On 12 November 2021, Maynard released the single "What I Put You Through", which he co-wrote, adding it was the "most personal song [he'd] ever released". On 19 November 2021, the single charted at number 40 on the UK Singles Sales Chart but failed to chart on the UK Top 100. In April 2023, Maynard announced the upcoming release of his third studio album, +11 Hours, which would be his first album of original music in over a decade. On 9 June 2023, +11 Hours was released. The album was preceded by the singles "If I Ever", "By Your Side" and "Storage".

On 24 May 2024, Swedish singer Darin released the single "Moonlight"; Maynard is credited as a co-writer of the song.

On 4 September 2026, Maynard released a new EP entitled "my sister got a haircut".

== Personal life ==
In 2024, Charlotte Chilton, a contestant on the second series of The Traitors claimed that Maynard is the father of her child. Maynard subsequently took a paternity test confirming that he was not the father.

== Discography ==
=== Albums ===
Title	Details	Peak chart positions										Certifications
Title	Details	UK	AUS	BEL (Fl)	CAN	DEN	IRE	NL	NZ	SWI	US	Certifications
Contrast	Released: 30 July 2012; Label: Parlophone; Formats: Digital download, CD	1	48	34	10	37	10	73	27	40	34	BPI: Silver
Covers	Released: 5 August 2016; Label: Parlophone; Formats: Digital download	—	—	—	—	—	79	54	—	—	—	
+11 Hours	Released: 9 June 2023; Label: Avex Trax; Formats: Digital download	— (Note: "+11 Hours" did not enter the UK Top 100 Albums Chart, but debuted and peaked at number 84 on the UK Album Downloads Chart Top 100 on 16 June 2023.)	—	—	—	—	—	—	—	—	—	
"—" denotes an album that did not chart or was not released in that territory.

=== Singles ===
==== As lead artist ====
Title	Year	Peak chart positions										Certifications	Album
Title	Year	UK	AUS	BEL (Fl)	CAN	GER	IRE	NL	NZ	US Bub.	US Pop	Certifications	Album
"Can't Say No"	2012	2	38	35	75	63	13	—	21	—	—	BPI: Silver	Contrast
"Vegas Girl"	2012	4	75	— (Note: "Vegas Girl" did not enter the Flanders Ultratop 50, but peaked at number seven on the Ultratip chart.)	—	63	22	52	—	1	27		Contrast
"Turn Around" (featuring Ne-Yo)	2012	8	43	26	—	76	14	15	28	10	32	BPI: Gold	Contrast
"Animal" (featuring Wiley)	2013	6	—	— (Note: "Animal" did not enter the Flanders Ultratop 50, but peaked at number ten on the Ultratip chart.)	—	—	27	44	—	—	—		Contrast
"R U Crazy"	2013	4	—	— (Note: "R U Crazy" did not enter the Flanders Ultratop 50, but peaked at number 49 on the Ultratip chart.)	—	—	18	—	—	—	—	BPI: Gold	Non-album singles
"Talking About"	2015	44	—	—	—	—	—	—	—	—	—		Non-album singles
"Royalty"	2015	—	—	—	—	—	—	—	—	—	—		Non-album singles
"Are You Sure?" (with Kris Kross Amsterdam featuring Ty Dolla Sign)	2016	— (Note: "Are You Sure?" did not enter the Official UK Singles chart, but peaked at number 94 on the UK Downloads chart.)	—	—	—	—	—	15	—	—	—		Non-album singles
"Understand Me" (with CMC$)	2017	—	—	—	—	—	—	— (Note: "Understand Me" did not enter the Single Top 100, but peaked at number 30 on the Dutch Single Tip chart.)	—	—	—		Non-album singles
"Hold on Tight" (with R3hab)	2018	—	—	—	—	—	—	—	—	—	—		The Wave
"Hate How Much I Love You"	2019	—	—	—	—	—	—	—	—	—	—		Non-album singles
"Not Over You"	2019	—	—	—	—	—	—	—	—	—	—		Non-album singles
"Ooh Girl" (with Kris Kross Amsterdam featuring A Boogie wit da Hoodie)	2019	—	—	—	—	—	—	—	—	—	—		Non-album singles
"Waste Your Time"	2019	—	—	—	—	—	—	—	—	—	—		Non-album singles
"Nothing but You"	2020	—	—	—	—	—	—	—	—	—	—		Non-album singles
"For the Night"	2020	—	—	—	—	—	—	—	—	—	—		Non-album singles
"You Broke Me First"	2020	—	—	—	—	—	—	—	—	—	—		Non-album singles
"Crowded Room"	2021	—	—	—	—	—	—	—	—	—	—		Non-album singles
"Early in the Morning" (with Kris Kross Amsterdam featuring Shaggy)	2021	—	—	—	—	—	—	3	—	—	—		Non-album singles
"Believers" (with Alan Walker)	2021	—	—	—	—	—	—	—	—	—	—		Non-album singles
"Ain't Got No Friends"	2021	—	—	—	—	—	—	—	—	—	—		Non-album singles
"What I Put You Through"	2021	— (Note: "What I Put You Through" did not enter the Official UK Singles chart, but peaked at number 40 on the UK Sales chart.)	—	—	—	—	—	—	—	—	—		Non-album singles
"If I Ever"	2023	—	—	—	—	—	—	—	—	—	—		+11 Hours
"By Your Side"	2023	—	—	—	—	—	—	—	—	—	—		+11 Hours
"Storage"	2023	—	—	—	—	—	—	—	—	—	—		+11 Hours
"Unwanted" (with Martin Jensen and Sam Feldt)	2023	—	—	—	—	—	—	—	—	—	—		Non-album single
"Something to Me"	2024	—	—	—	—	—	—	—	—	—	—		
"Masterpiece"	2024	—	—	—	—	—	—	—	—	—	—		
"She's So High" (with Jaxomy)	2025	—	—	—	—	—	—	—	—	—	—		
"Runaway Man"	2025	—	—	—	—	—	—	—	—	—	—		
"In Pieces Again" (with Sam Feldt)	2026	—	—	—	—	—	—	—	—	—	—		Non-album singles
"—" denotes a recording that did not chart or was not released in that territory.

==== As featured artist ====
Title	Year	Peak chart positions								Album
Title	Year	NLD	AUT	BEL (Fl)	GER	IRL	SWI	UK	US Elec.	Album
"I'm Famous" (Marcus Butler featuring Conor Maynard)	2016	—	—	—	—	—	—	85	—	Non-album singles
"Dancing in the Headlights" (DJ Antoine featuring Conor Maynard)	2016	—	—	—	—	—	—	—	—	Non-album singles
"Catch Me Here" (Drumsound & Bassline Smith featuring Conor Maynard)	2016	—	—	—	—	—	—	—	—	Non-album singles
"All My Love" (Cash Cash featuring Conor Maynard)	2017	—	—	—	—	—	—	—	—	Say It Like You Feel It
"Whenever" (Kris Kross Amsterdam and The Boy Next Door featuring Conor Maynard)	2018	3	56	25	46	34	68	95	18	Non-album single
"How You Love Me" (Hardwell featuring Conor Maynard and Snoop Dogg)	2018	—	—	—	—	—	—	—	—	TBA
"Pray" (Alok featuring Conor Maynard)	2019	—	—	—	—	—	—	—	—	Non-album singles
Medicine" (Anth featuring Conor Maynard)	2019	—	—	—	—	—	—	—	—	Non-album singles
"If U" (Breathe Carolina and Robert Falcon featuring Conor Maynard)	2020	—	—	—	—	—	—	—	—	Non-album singles
"Don't Wanna Stop" (Alphalove featuring Conor Maynard)	2021	—	—	—	—	—	—	—	—	Non-album singles
"—" denotes a recording that did not chart or was not released in that territory.

=== Other charted songs ===
Title	Year	Peak chart positions	Album
Title	Year	UK	Album
"Better than You" (featuring Rita Ora)	2012	105	Contrast

=== Promotional singles ===
Title	Year	Album
"Drowning"	2012	Contrast
"Pictures"	2013	Contrast

=== Production credits ===
Title	Year	Artist	Role
"Remedy"	2018	Alesso	Uncredited vocalist

=== Songwriting credits ===
List of credited songwriting contributions with other performing artists, showing year released and originating album name
Title	Year	Artist	Album
"Answer: Love Myself"	2018	BTS	Love Yourself: Answer
"Face to Face" (面对面)	2020	WayV	Take Over the Moon
"Don't Worry Baby" (With Celina Sharma)	2022	Stan Walker	All In
"Moonlight"	2024	Darin	Non-album single
