= List of songs recorded by Iggy Azalea =

Songs recorded by Iggy Azalea
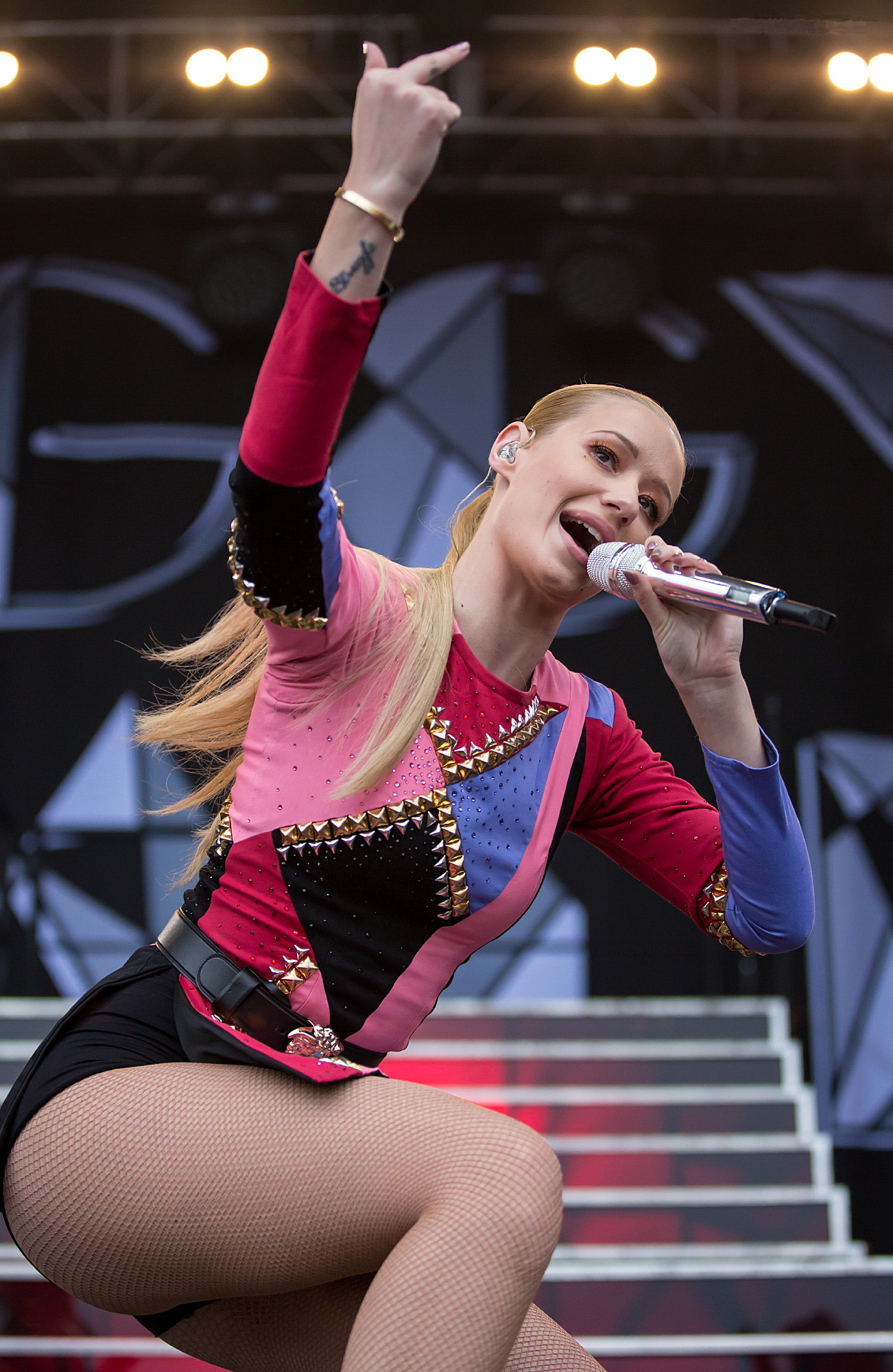
- Azalea performing at the ACL Music Festival in October 2014
- Released songs: 139

Australian rapper Iggy Azalea has recorded songs for three studio albums, one reissue, one extended play (EP), and three mixtapes; some of which were collaborations with other artist among other releases. Azalea's first mixtape Ignorant Art, her debut music release, and the project generally credited as her career breakthrough, was released in September 2011; it was recorded in Los Angeles where Azalea had been residing since the previous year after migrating from Australia to the United States in 2006 when she was age 16 to pursue a rap career. Prior to the release of the mixtape, Azalea had shared several home videos on her YouTube channel as an underground rapper. She then aligned herself with Southern rapper T.I., eventually signing with his Grand Hustle imprint in 2012. With plans to release her debut studio album that year, she ended up putting out a free six-song EP titled Glory in July; it includes material slated for the album and recorded during her time in Atlanta. In May 2012, Azalea was featured on Steve Aoki and Angger Dimas' collaborative electronic track "Beat Down". Azalea then announced that she would be releasing her second mixtape in October 2012, TrapGold, produced by Diplo and FKi.

In early 2013, Azalea signed a record deal with Virgin EMI in the United Kingdom, and Def Jam in the United States, both owned by the Universal Music Group. Meanwhile, she was working on her upcoming singles including "Work", "Bounce", and "Change Your Life", featuring T.I. In April 2014, Azalea released her debut studio album, The New Classic, including the songs "Fancy" featuring Charli XCX and "Black Widow" featuring Rita Ora. During that period, Azalea made guest appearances in singles by other artists such as Ariana Grande's "Problem", T.I.'s "No Mediocre" and Jennifer Lopez's "Booty". Later that year, she re-released The New Classic as Reclassified, which featured songs from the original album and five newly recorded tracks, including "Beg for It" featuring MØ and "Trouble" featuring Jennifer Hudson. In 2015, Azalea released "Pretty Girls", a duet with Britney Spears; it appeared on the soundtrack for Furious 7, after making a cameo in the action film Furious 7. Azalea has released "Team", "Mo Bounce", and "Switch" as singles from her second album Digital Distortion. On 7 November 2017, Azalea stated that she is not allowed to release music until January 2018, as she signed with a new label. She also announced the new title of her second album, Surviving the Summer, and put four new tracks for free download via WeTransfer. The media has dubbed the songs as a four-track mixtape or EP called 4 My Ratz. In January 2018, Azalea announced the title of the lead single from Surviving the Summer, "Savior" featuring Quavo, which was released on 2 February 2018. On 5 July, Azalea released two tracks from the EP "Tokyo Snow Trip" and "Kream"; the latter featuring Tyga. Survive the Summer was released on 3 August 2018. On 27 February, Azalea announced that "Sally Walker" would be the first single off the album. On 3 May 2019, Azalea released the album's official second single, "Started". On 24 June 2019, Azalea announced via Twitter that her album In My Defense would be released on 19 July 2019. On 27 September 2019, Azalea announced that she would be releasing a new extended play. In an interview with Entertainment Weekly, Azalea stated that she was not sure if she would tour to promote the record but she plans to begin recording new material in September with hopes of putting it out next year. She later announced on her Twitter that she planned on releasing a new extended play on 15 November 2019 entitled Wicked Lips following the release of its lead single, "Lola"

== Songs ==
Key
†	Indicates single release
‡	Indicates promotional single release
*	Indicates an unreleased song

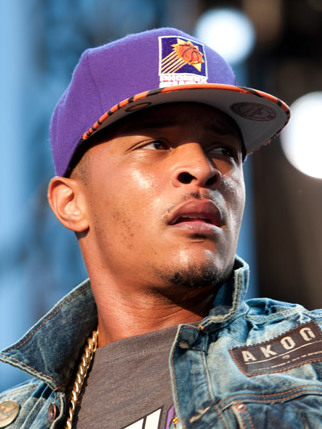
T.I. (pictured) has collaborated with Azalea in multiple songs since they aligned in 2012, most notable songs include: "Change Your Life", "No Mediocre" and "Murda Biznees"

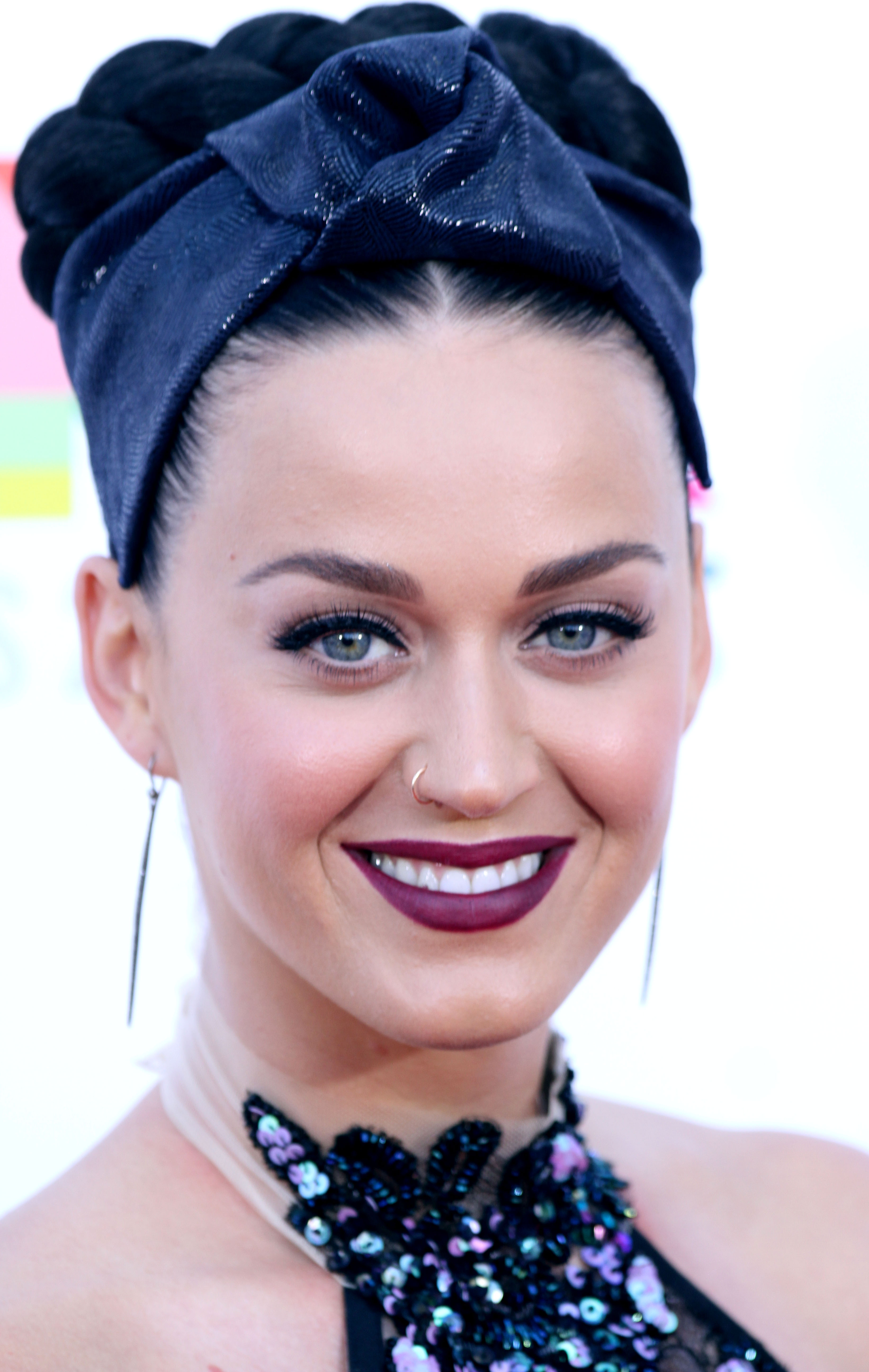
Katy Perry (pictured) co-wrote the hook of Azalea's 2014 single "Black Widow".

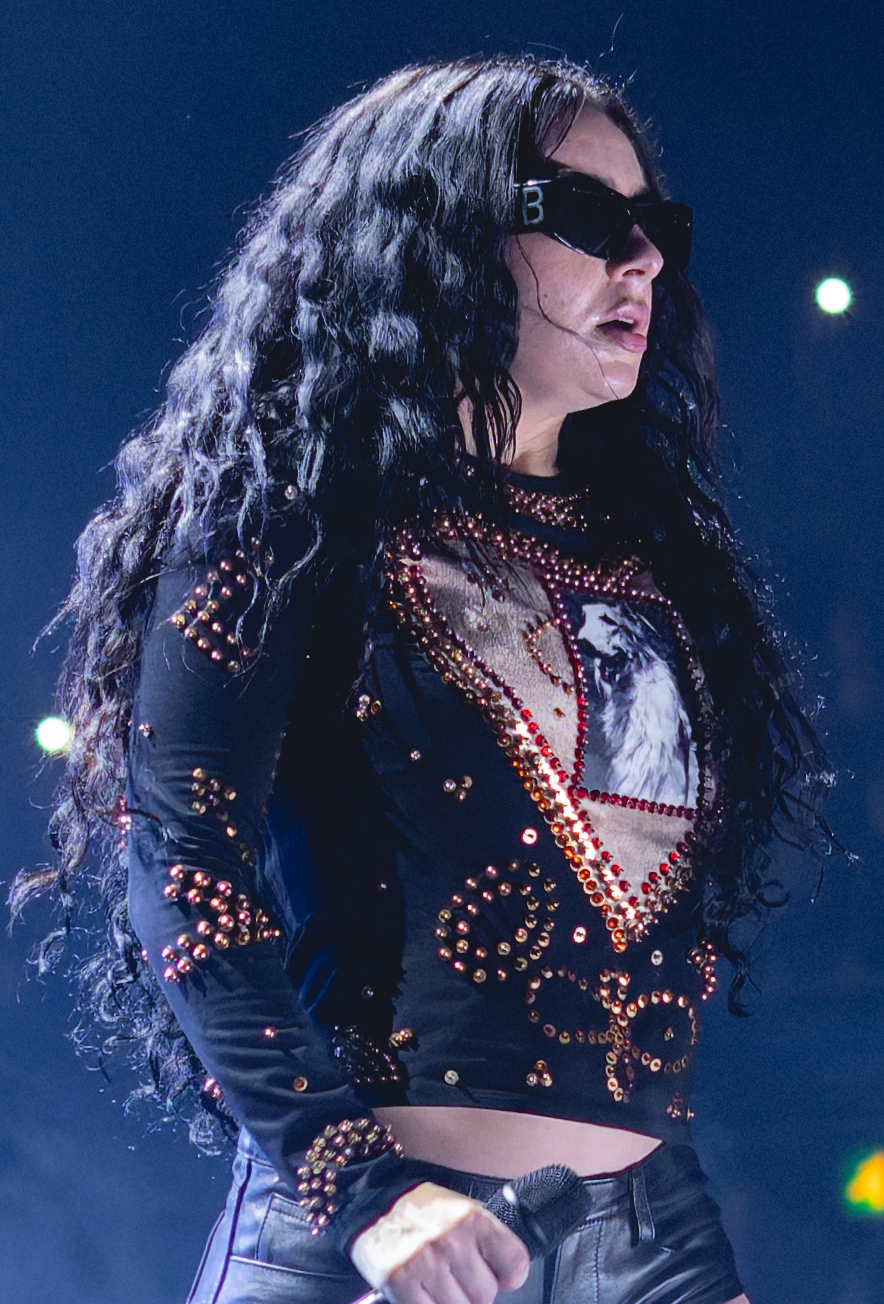
Charli XCX (pictured) is featured on Azalea's 2014 single "Fancy" which peaked at number one on the US Hot 100.

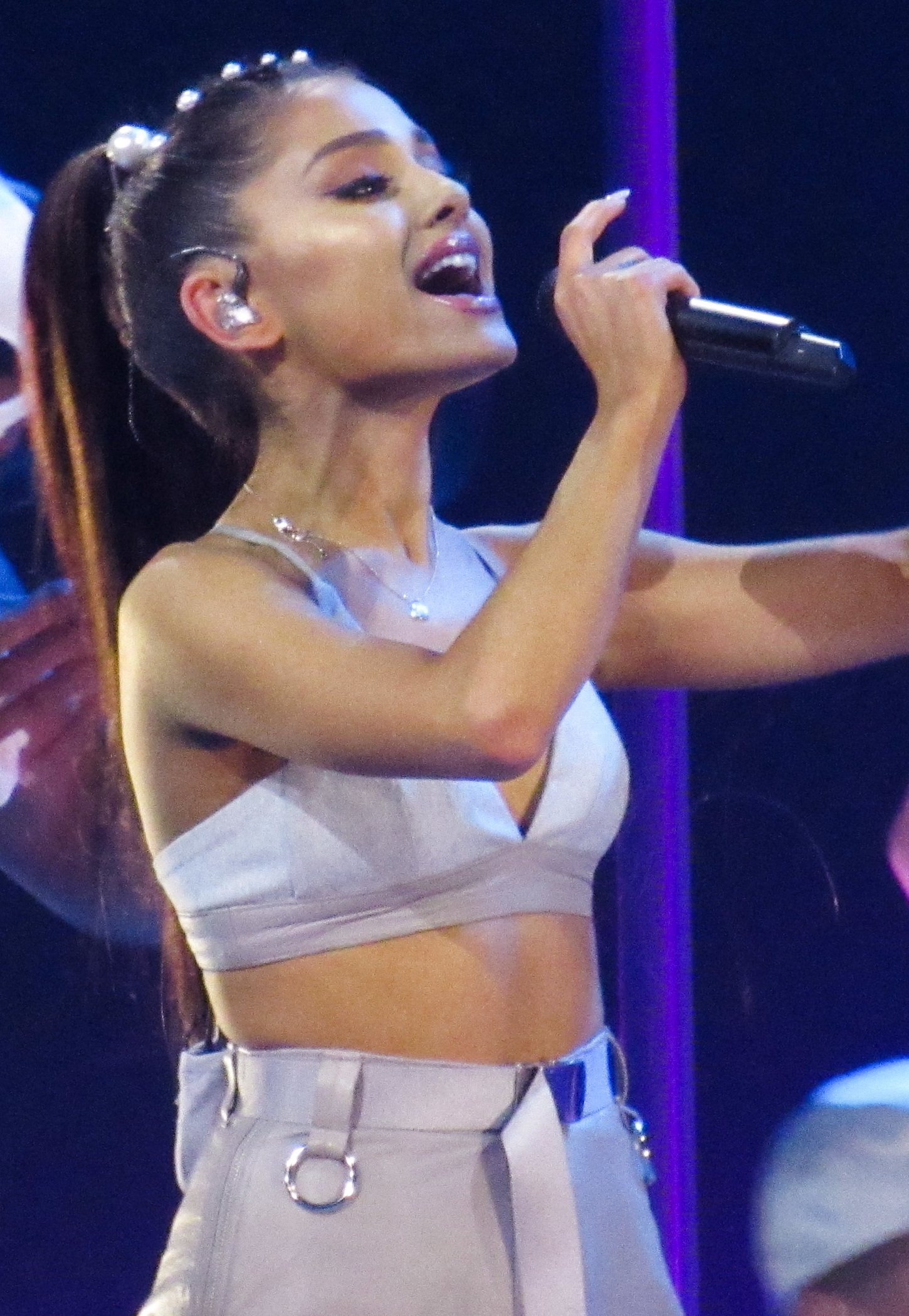
Azalea wrote her verse on Ariana Grande's (pictured) 2014 single "Problem" and appears as a featured artist.

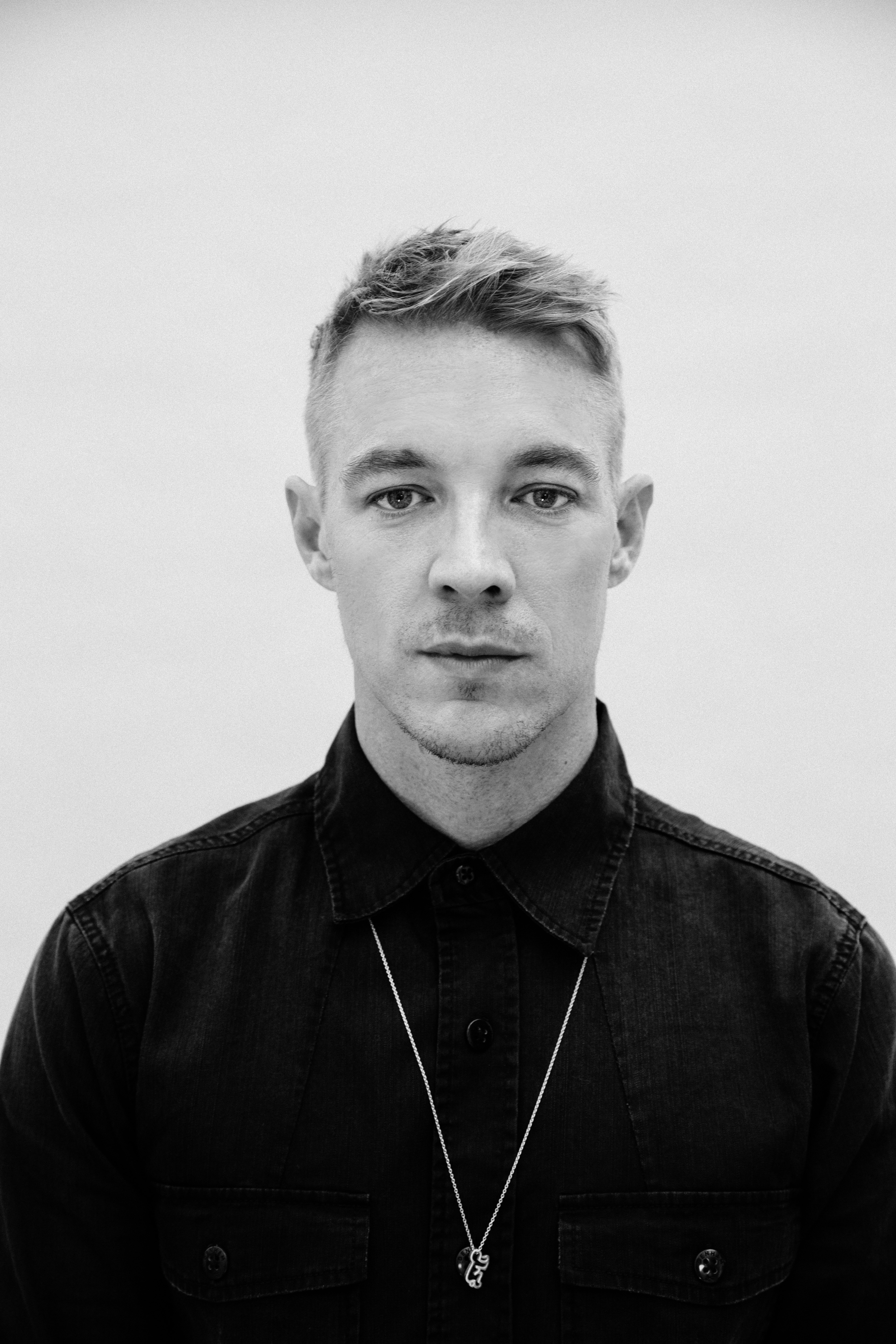
Diplo (pictured) executive produced Azalea's 2012 mixtape TrapGold and have worked together on other songs.

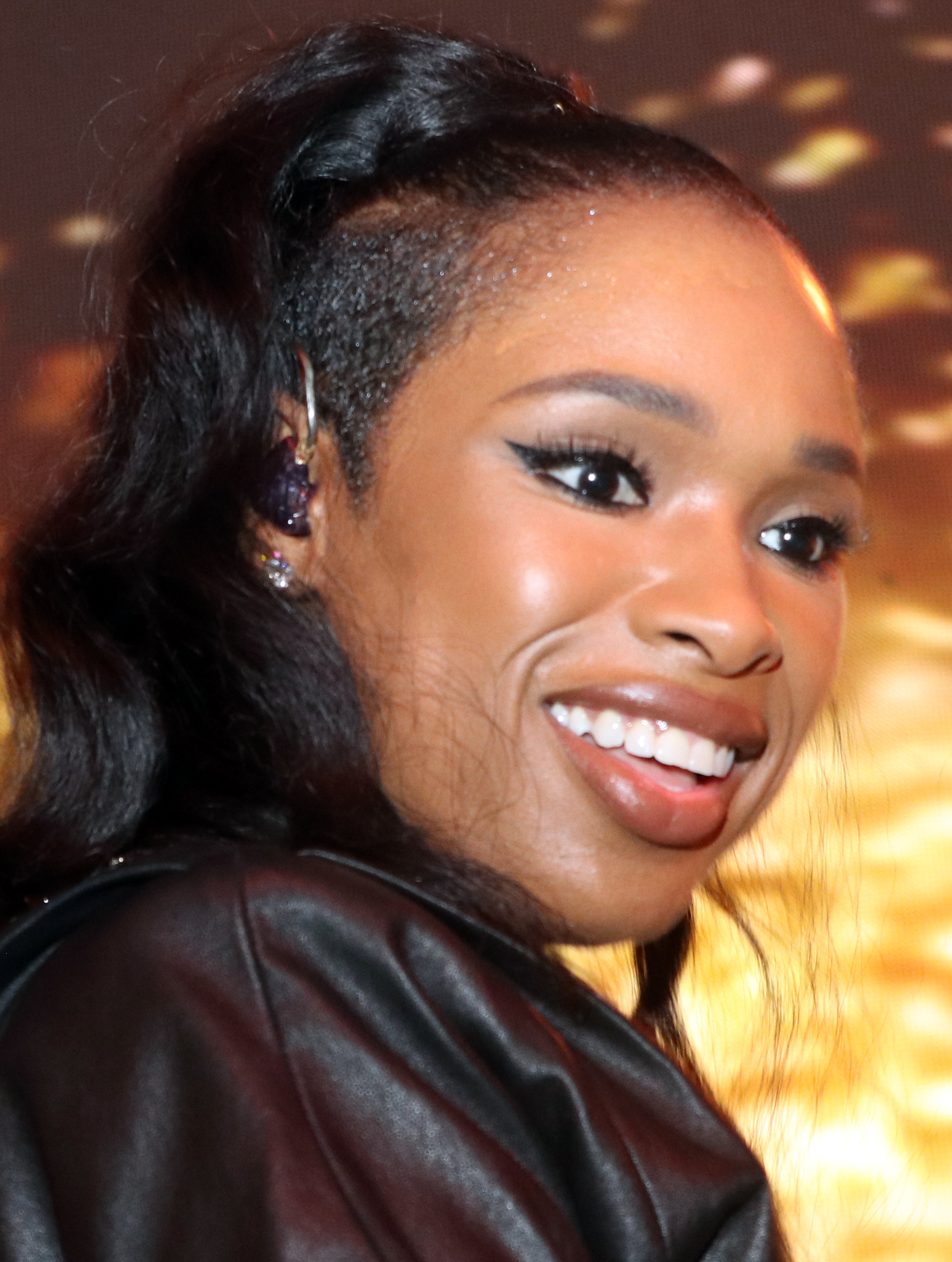
Jennifer Hudson (pictured) collaborated with Azalea on songs "Trouble" and "He Ain't Goin' Nowhere"

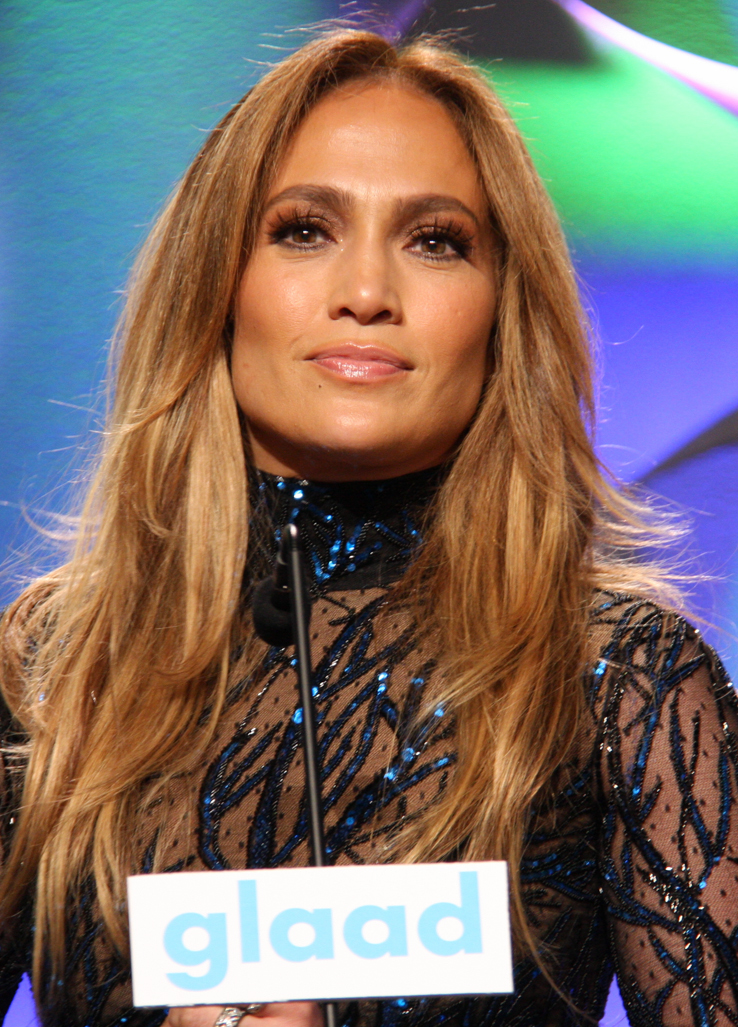
Jennifer Lopez collaborated with Azalea on "Booty" & "Acting Like That" for her Album A.K.A.

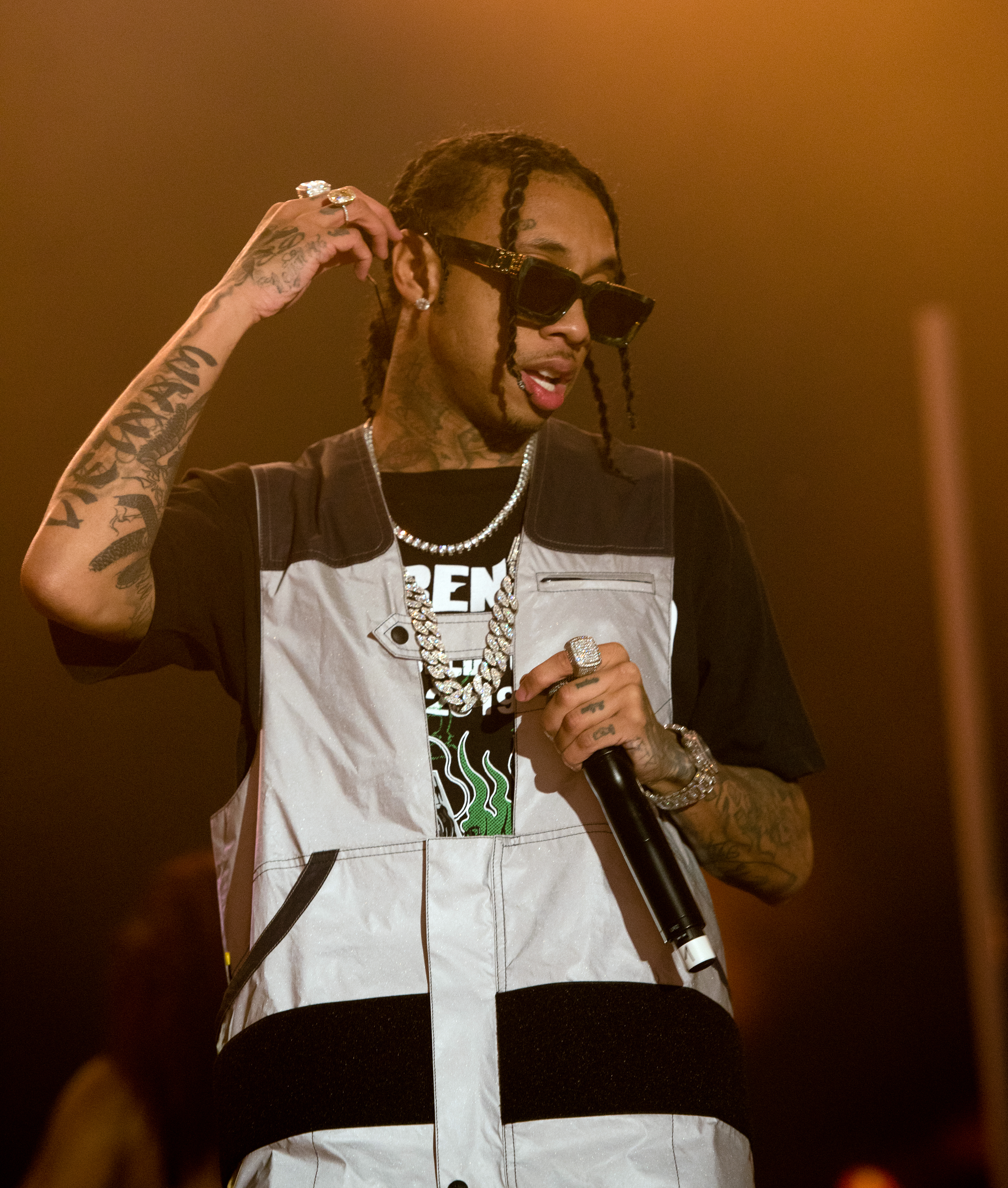
Tyga and Azalea collaborated on "Kream" (2018) and "Sip It" (2021)

Year	Title	Other performer(s)	Writer(s)	Album	Ref(s).
2012	"1 800 BONE"	None	—N/a	TrapGold	
2014	"100"	Watch The Duck	Iggy Azalea; T.I. Oscar White; Watch The Duck	The New Classic	
2017	"7Teen" *	None	Iggy Azalea	Digital Distortion	
2014	"Acting Like That"	Jennifer Lopez	Leon Youngblood; XSDTRK; Terence Coles; James "JDoe" Smith; Mark Pitts; K. Stephens; Iggy Azalea; Jennifer Lopez	A.K.A.	
2015	"All Hands on Deck" (Remix) ‡	Tinashe	Tinashe; Stargate; Cashmere Cat; Bebe Rexha; Iggy Azalea	Non-album single	
2014	"Animal Noise"	None	—N/a	None	
2016	"Azillion"	None	Iggy Azalea	Digital Distortion	
2012	"Bac 2 Tha Future (My Time)"	None	Iggy Azalea	TrapGold	
2011	"Backseat"	Chevy Jones	Iggy Azalea	Ignorant Art	
2012	"Beat Down" †	Steve Aoki; Angger Dimas	Steve Aoki; Angger Dimas; Iggy Azalea; Brandon Salaam Bailey	Wonderland (Remixed)	
2014	"Beg for It" †	MØ	Iggy Azalea; Charli XCX; The Invisible Men; Kurtis McKenzie; Jon Turner	Reclassified	
2012	"Best Friend"	B.o.B; Mac Miller	B.o.B; Mac Miller; Iggy Azalea; Jamieson James	Fuck 'Em We Ball	
2019	"Big Bag"	Stini	Iggy Azalea; Stini	In My Defense	
2014	"Black Widow" †	Rita Ora	Iggy Azalea; Tor Erik Hermansen; Mikkel Storleer Eriksen; Benny Blanco; Katy Perry; Sarah Hudson	The New Classic	
2017	"Boom Boom"	Zedd	Iggy Azalea; Stix; Starrah; Zedd; Alexander Palmer; Jeremy Hawkins; Priscilla Hamilton; Mike Fonseca; Marlon "Chordz" Barrow	Pitch Perfect 3: Original Motion Picture Soundtrack	
2014	"Booty" †	Jennifer Lopez	Cory Rooney; Jennifer Lopez; Benny Medina; Chris Brown; Asia Bryant; Diplo; Lewis D. Gittus; Tedra Renee Wilson; Danny Omerhodic; Iggy Azalea	A.K.A.	
2012	"Boss Lady"	None	—N/a	Woman On Top	
2013	"Bounce" †	None	Iggy Azalea; Mark Orabiyi; Oladayo Olatunji; Natalie Sims; Mike Di Scala; Speedy J	The New Classic	
2019	"Boys Like You"	VVAVES	Iggy Azalea; VVAVES	—N/a	
2012	"Burgundy Shit" *	None	—N/a	None	
2021	"Brazil"	none	Iggy Azalea; Bobby D. Session Jr.	The End Of An Era	
2021	"Brazil (Remix)"	Gloria Groove	Iggy Azalea; Bobby D. Session Jr.	None	
2017	"Can't Lose"	Lil Uzi Vert	Iggy Azalea; Lasanna "Ace" Harris; Verse Simmonds; Shama "Sak Pase" Joseph; Tumeh Gailor; Lil Uzi Vert	Def Jams Presents: Direct Deposit (Vol. 2)	
2013	"Change Your Life" (Note: A solo version of "Change Your Life" was also released in October 2013.) †	T.I.	Iggy Azalea; Natalie Sims; Raja Kumari; The Messengers; Lovy Longomba; T.I.	The New Classic	
2013	"Chasin Me"	T.I. Young Dro; Kris Stephens	—N/a	G.D.O.D. (Get Dough or Die)	
2013	"Cheeks" *	None	—N/a	None	
2019	"Clap Back"	None	Iggy Azalea	In My Defense	
2019	"Comme des Garçons"	None	Iggy Azalea	In My Defense	
2019	"Cum"	Brooke Candy	Brooke Candy; Iggy Azalea; Ashnikko; Oscar Scheller	Sexorcism	
2020	"Dance Like Nobody's Watching"	Tinashe	none	Iggy Azalea; Tinashe; Bobby D. Session Jr. Haven; Jordan Harry Monroe Baum; Michael McNamara	
2011	"D.R.U.G.S." (Remix)	YG	Iggy Azalea	None	
2012	"Demons"	None	—N/a	TrapGold	
2013	"Designer Drugs" *	None	—N/a	None	
2013	"Dibby Sound" *	None	—N/a	None	
2014	"Don't Need Y'all"	None	Iggy Azalea; The Invisible Men; Jon Mills; Jon Turner	The New Classic	
2012	"Down South"	None	—N/a	TrapGold	
2011	"Drop That Shit"	Problem	Iggy Azalea; T.I. Problem	Ignorant Art	
2017	"Elephant" *	YG	Iggy Azalea; YG	Digital Distortion	
2014	"Fancy" (Note: "Fancy" was originally a demo called "Leave It" that leaked in December 2013.) †	Charli XCX	Iggy Azalea; Charli XCX; The Invisible Men; The Arcade	The New Classic	
2012	"Flash"	Mike Posner	Iggy Azalea; Mike Posner; Glenda Proby	Glory	
2012	"Flexin' & Finessin'"	Juicy J	Iggy Azalea; Juicy J FKi	TrapGold	
2019	"Freak Of The Week"	Juicy J	Iggy Azalea; Juicy J	In My Defense	
2019	"F*ck It Up" †	Kash Doll	Iggy Azalea; Kash Doll	In My Defense	
2014	"Fuck Love"	None	Iggy Azalea; Jon Turner; Jon Mills; Rock City; The Invisible Men	The New Classic	
2015	"G.U.N.S."	Sauce Lord Rich	—N/a	Know Me	
2015	"Girl Crush" *	Selena Gomez	—N/a	None	
2012	"Glory"	None	Iggy Azalea; Glenda Proby	Glory	
2015	"Go Hard or Go Home" ‡	Wiz Khalifa	Wiz Khalifa; Iggy Azalea; The Featherstones	Furious 7: Original Motion Picture Soundtrack	
2014	"Goddess"	None	Iggy Azalea; The Invisible Men; Jon Turner; Jon Mills; Frank Farian	The New Classic	
2017	"Going Up"	Ljay Currie	Iggy Azalea; Ljay Currie	4 My Ratz	
2012	"Golddust"	None	—N/a	TrapGold	
2017	"Good"	None	Iggy Azalea; Ljay Currie	4 My Ratz	
2017	"Hate On It"	None	Iggy Azalea; Ljay Currie	4 My Ratz	
2014	"He Ain't Goin' Nowhere"	Jennifer Hudson	Pharrell Williams; Amethyst Kelly	JHUD	
2014	"Heavy Crown"	Ellie Goulding	Iggy Azalea; The Invisible Men; Ellie Goulding; Jon Turner; Salt Wives	Reclassified	
2014	"Hell You Sayin'"	T.I. Young Dro; Travis Scott	—N/a	SXEW (South by East West)	
2011	"Hello"	Joe Moses	—N/a	Ignorant Art	
2018	"Hey Iggy"	None	Iggy Azalea; Tyga; Michael Chapman; Nicky Chinn; Dylan Wiggins; Joseph Epperson	Survive the Summer	
2013	"Hilife" *	None	—N/a	None	
2013	"High Level"	Skeme	Skeme; Iggy Azalea	Ingleworld	
2019	"Hoemita"	Lil Yachty	Iggy Azalea; Lil Yachty	In My Defense	
2011	"Home Town Hatred"	None	—N/a	None	
2012	"Hustle Gang"	Chip; T.I.	S-X	London Boy	
2012	"I Think She Ready"	FKi; Diplo	—N/a	Transformers n the Hood	
2014	"I'm Coming Out" (The Other Woman Remix)	Keyshia Cole	Bernard Edwards; Nile Rodgers; Iggy Azalea	None	
2012	"Iggy in Moscow" (Remix)	None	—N/a	None	
2014	"Iggy SZN" ‡	None	Iggy Azalea; The Invisible Men; Darryl Reid; Jon Turner	Reclassified	
2014	"Impossible Is Nothing" ‡	None	Iggy Azalea; The Arcade; Joey Dyer; The Invisible Men; Gabriel Yared	The New Classic	
2018	"In a Haze [Remix]"	Total Ape	Iggy Azalea	In a Haze - EP	
2014	"Just Askin'"	None	Iggy Azalea; The Invisible Men; Natalie Sims; Ryan Woodcock; Markous Roberts	The New Classic	
2019	"Just Wanna"	None	Iggy Azalea	In My Defense	
2018	"Kawasaki"	None	Iggy Azalea; Joseph Epperson	Survive the Summer	
2015	"Kingdom Come"	Demi Lovato	Demi Lovato; Julia Michaels; Iggy Azalea; Steve Mac	Confident	
2014	"Know About Me" (Remix) ‡	DJ Green Lantern; Valentino Khan	Iggy Azalea; DJ Green Lantern; Valentino Khan	Non-album single	
2018	"Kream" †	Tyga	Iggy Azalea; Tyga; Lamont Hawkins; Corey Woods; Brother J Dennis Coles; RZA; Ol' Dirty Bastard; Method Man; Gary Grice; David Porter; Isaac Hayes; Paimon Jahanbin; Ronny J	Survive the Summer	
2014	"Lady Patra"	Mavado	Iggy Azalea; Mavado; Jon Turner; The Invisible Men; Rock City; Daler Mehndi	The New Classic	
2013	"Last Plane" *	None	—N/a	None	
2013	"Leave It" *	None	—N/a	None	
2012	"Light as a Feather"	Katy B Diplo	Diplo; Iggy Azalea; Katy B	Danger EP	
2019	"Like Dat" *	Fergie; Major Lazer	Fergie; Iggy Azalea; Major Lazer	None	
2013	"Live a Little" *	None	—N/a	None	
2013	"Live Free" *	None	—N/a	None	
2018	"Love Don't Fail Me Now" *	Jeremih	Iggy Azalea; Jeremih	Digital Distortion	
2019	"Lola" †	Alice Chater	Iggy Azalea; Alice Chater; Fahad Alhaj; Kinnda	Wicked Lips	
2019	"Mek It Bunx Up" *	DJ Fresh; Marcy Chin; DeeWunn	Iggy Azalea; Marcy Chin	None	
2017	"Middle Man" *	None	Iggy Azalea	Digital Distortion	
2014	"Million Dollar Dream"	A. R. Rahman	A. R. Rahman; Iggy Azalea	Million Dollar Arm (Original Motion Picture Soundtrack)	
2012	"Millionaire Misfits" (Note: "Millionaire Misfits" is also alternatively titled "Million Dollar Misfits".)	B.o.B	Iggy Azalea; B.o.B; T.I. Maejor	Glory	
2017	"Mo Bounce" †	None	Iggy Azalea; Lasanna "Ace" Harris; Verse Simmonds; Shama "Sak Pase" Joseph; Tumeh Gailor; Lil Uzi Vert	None	
2012	"Mo Flow"	Skeme	Skeme; Iggy Azalea	Alive & Living	
2024	"Money Come"	None	Iggy Azalea	None	
2013	"Monkey" *	None	—N/a	None	
2012	"Murda Bizness"	T.I.	Iggy Azalea; Glenda Proby; T.I. Maejor; Rock City	Glory	
2011	"My World"	None	Iggy Azalea; Marlon "Chordz" Barrow; Stix	Ignorant Art	
2017	"Never Satisfied"	None	Iggy Azalea; LJay Currie	4 My Ratz	
2014	"New Bitch"	None	Iggy Azalea; The Invisible Men; Natalie Sims; Joey Dyer	The New Classic	
2014	"No Mediocre" †	T.I.	T.I. Iggy Azalea; DJ Mustard	Paperwork	
2019	"Not Important"	None	Iggy Azalea	Wicked Lips	
2018	"OMG"	Wiz Khalifa	Iggy Azalea; Wiz Khalifa; Eric Weaver; Akil C. King; Smash David	Survive the Summer	
2013	"Otis" (Remix)	Angel Haze	—N/a	None	
2019	"Personal Problem"	None	Iggy Azalea	Wicked Lips	
2012	"Picture Me Rollin'" *	None	—N/a	None	
2015	"Pretty Girls" †	Britney Spears	The Invisible Men; Maegan Cottone; Iggy Azalea; Little Mix	Non-album single	
2014	"Problem" †	Ariana Grande	Max Martin; Savan Kotecha; Ilya; Iggy Azalea; Ariana Grande	My Everything	
2011	"Pu$$y"	None	Iggy Azalea; Marlon "Chordz" Barrow; Stix	Ignorant Art	
2019	"Pussy Pop"	None	Iggy Azalea	In My Defense	
2012	"Quicktime"	None	—N/a	TrapGold	
2012	"Raise Your Weapon"	Stix deadmau5	Stix; Iggy Azalea	I Told U So	
2014	"Rolex"	None	Iggy Azalea; The Invisible Men; Kurtis McKenzie	The New Classic	
2012	"Runway"	Pusha T	Iggy Azalea; Pusha T B.o.B	Glory	
2019	"Sally Walker" †	None	Iggy Azalea; J. White Did It	In My Defense	
2018	"Savior" †	Quavo	Iggy Azalea; Quavo; Akil King; Myjah Veira; Kyle Owens; Verse Simmonds; Ian Devaney; Dr. Luke; Lisa Stansfield; Andy Morris; Cirkut	Non-album single	
2016	"Sexy" *	French Montana	—N/a	None	
2021	"Sex On The Beach"	Sophia Scott	Iggy Azalea; Sophia Scott; Bobby D. Session Jr.	The End Of An Era	
2021	"Sip It"	Tyga	Iggy Azalea; Tyga; OG Parker	The End Of An Era	
2012	"Slo."	None	Iggy Azalea	TrapGold	
2019	"Spend It"	None	Iggy Azalea	In My Defense	
2017	"Somebody Else" *	None	Iggy Azalea	Digital Distortion	
2019	"Started" †	None	Iggy Azalea; Ronny Wright	In My Defense	
2018	"Survive the Summer"	None	Iggy Azalea; Ljay Currie	Survive the Summer	
2017	"Switch" †	Anitta	Iggy Azalea; The Notorious B.I.G. Christopher Martin; Jalacy Hawkins; Akil C. King; Kyle Owens; Maurice Simmonds; Georgia Ku; Anton Malmberg Hård af Segerstad	Non-album single	
2011	"T.W.O. Interlude" *	None	—N/a	None	
2016	"Team" †	None	Iggy Azalea; Bebe Rexha; Lauren Christy; Juvenile; Lil Wayne; Mannie Fresh	Non-album single	
2019	"Thanks I Get"	None	Iggy Azalea	In My Defense	
2011	"The Last Song"	None	Iggy Azalea; Tiffany Gouche; Marlon "Chordz" Barrow	Ignorant Art	
2019	"The Girls"	Pabllo Vittar	Iggy Azalea; Noah Cyrus	Wicked Lips	
2018	"Tokyo Snow Trip"	None	Iggy Azalea; Joseph Epperson	Survive the Summer	
2016	"Tonight (It's a Party)"	Stephen Marley; DJ Khaled; Waka Flocka Flame	Rohan Bennett; Trevor James; Amethyst Kelly; DJ Khaled; Juaquin Malphurs; Stephen Marley; Morgan Memmalatel	Revelation Pt. II: "The Fruit of Life"	
2011	"Treasure Island"	None	—N/a	Ignorant Art	
2014	"Trouble" †	Jennifer Hudson	Iggy Azalea; Judith Hill; Isabella Summers; The Invisible Men; Salt Wives; Jon Turner	Reclassified	
2014	"Walk the Line"	None	Iggy Azalea; Kurtis McKenzie; The Invisible Men; Jon Turner	The New Classic	
2012	"Waste It All" *	Trey Songz	—N/a	None	
2014	"We Go Hard"	T.I. Spodee	T.I. Spodee; Iggy Azalea	G.D.O.D. II	
2014	"We in This Bitch"	None	Iggy Azalea; The Invisible Men; Salt Wives; Jon Turner	Reclassified	
2013	"Whatchu Lookin At"	None	Iggy Azalea	None	
2013	"Wickedest Style"	Sean Paul	Jason "Jigzagula" Henriques; Sean Paul; Keyz; Polow da Don; Iggy Azalea	Full Frequency	
2013	"Work" †	None	Iggy Azalea; The Invisible Men; Trocon Markous Roberts; Natalie Sims	The New Classic	
2012	"Yo El Ray"	None	—N/a	TrapGold	
2011	"You"	YG	Iggy Azalea; YG	Ignorant Art	
2021	"Is That Right"	BIA	Iggy Azalea; BIA	The End Of An Era	
