= Change Your Life (Iggy Azalea song) =

Single by Iggy Azalea featuring T.I.

from the album The New Classic
- B-side: "Work" (Vevo stripped mix)
- Released: 12 September 2013
- Studio: Monnow Valley (Wales)
- Genre: Hip-hop; dubstep; synth-pop
- Length: 3:40
- Label: Def Jam; Virgin EMI
- Songwriters: Iggy Azalea; Natalie Sims; Raja Kumari; The Messengers; Lovy Longomba; T.I.
- Producer: The Messengers

Iggy Azalea singles chronology
"Bounce" (2013)	"Change Your Life" (2013)	"Fancy" (2014)

T.I. singles chronology
"I Wish" (2013)	"Change Your Life" (2013)	"I Can't Describe (The Way I Feel)" (2013)

Music video
- "Change Your Life" on YouTube

"Change Your Life" is a song by Australian rapper Iggy Azalea featuring American rapper T.I., from Azalea's debut studio album The New Classic (2014). The song was released as the album's second single in the United States on 12 September 2013, and the third single internationally after "Bounce". Initially a demo by Indian-American songwriter Raja Kumari, the song's final composition was co-written by Azalea, Natalie Sims, Kumari, the song's producers The Messengers, Lovy Longomba and T.I. It is a midtempo hip-hop, dubstep and synthpop song inspired by Azalea's personal dating experiences, and consists of bass-driven and synth-heavy production. Described by Azalea as "a kind of rap duet", it features her singing on a track for the first time which she took upon to showcase growth and versatility from her previous material.

The song was well received by most music critics who complimented Azalea's delivery and the track's lyrics. Commercially, "Change Your Life" became Azalea's first top 10 hit on the UK Singles Chart. In the United States, it failed to enter the main Billboard Hot 100 chart, but reached number 22 on Bubbling Under Hot 100 Singles and was certified gold by the Recording Industry Association of America (RIAA). The song also reached the top 40 in Ireland and New Zealand, and peaked at number 44 in Australia.

An accompanying music video was directed by Jonas & François; it premiered on 8 September 2013. Based on the 1995 film Showgirls, it features Azalea playing the film's character, Nomi (Elizabeth Berkley), with T.I. as her boss. The video, which also pays homage to the films Blade Runner (1982) and Casino (1995), received acclaim from critics who praised its styling and cinematography. Azalea promoted the single with live performances on 106 & Park, Alan Carr: Chatty Man, The Late Show with David Letterman and at the 2013 MOBO Awards. It was also included in the setlist for her 2014 The New Classic Tour, and featured on the soundtrack for the 2015 film Pitch Perfect 2.

== Background ==
I wanted to leave something for the album, where I'm giving you something new that you didn't know about me, that I could do or something about my story you didn't know.

— Azalea on her decision to sing on "Change Your Life"

"Change Your Life" was initially a demo written and recorded by Indian-American songwriter Raja Kumari who presented the song to Iggy Azalea's management. Following their approval, Kumari went on to further compose the track with Lovy Longomba of the Longombas, and the song's co-producer Nasri Atweh of The Messengers, while Azalea wrote its verses. Natalie Sims, co-producer Adam Messinger of The Messengers, and T.I. were also involved in the songwriting process. Sims stated that she and Azalea had initially met back in 2008, but lost touch when Azalea moved to Los Angeles, California. She ended up skipping four scheduled tour dates in order to meet with Azalea. Azalea's verses were written during December 2012 and January 2013 in Wales where she recorded the track with T.I. at Monnow Valley Studios. Both Azalea and Kumari provided background vocals. Azalea's writing took place in isolation in Rockfield, Monmouthshire, with no phone reception, visitors or interruptions. She believed the isolation was needed, opining that she wrote her best material while outside her comfort zone. It was one of the first three songs recorded for her debut studio album, The New Classic (2014).

The track was inspired by a personal experience where Azalea went on dates with someone she liked, but struggled to convince him to begin a relationship with her. The experience in turn made Azalea want to write a song about the benefits of dating her. In an interview for XXL, she explained: "I am saying to a man, essentially, 'You need me. I'll make things better.' I guess it's a bit [to] upgrade you. T.I.'s going back and forth with me saying, 'No, bitch. You need me. What the fuck are you talking about?'" Azalea previously collaborated with T.I. on "Murda Bizness"—a song from her 2012 EP, Glory. However, she wanted to include a track with him on The New Classic because of their close relationship and his mentorship throughout her career; she believed "Change Your Life" was the right song to team up with him on. Azalea also felt the collaboration was important to show that she maintains a friendship with T.I. despite her move from his label, Hustle Gang, and insisted, "['Change Your Life' was] definitely not [her] trying to make [her] silent exit from Hustle Gang". In an interview for Capital Xtra, Azalea jokingly stated that she "bullied" T.I. into featuring on the track.

According to Azalea, the song is more melodic than her previous material; it features her singing on a track for the first time. Initially, she was against singing as she did not want to conform to pop music until she had "a solidified fan base" and wanted to prove that she was dedicated to rapping and hip hop music. However, with "Change Your Life", she also wanted prove her versatility and growth from her previous material. Jaycen Joshua completed the track's mixing process at Larrabee Sound Studios in North Hollywood, Los Angeles, with the assistance of Ryan Kaul. Upon its completion, Azalea felt that the song was "a big record"; "It feels like, 'Whoa, this is humongous when you listen to it'". She found the collaboration to be a good representation of her vision for the album and said the song set the album's midtempo pace.

== Composition ==
"Change Your Life"
A 21-second sample of "Change Your Life" in which prominent bass instruments is featured with Azalea performing a half-spoken, half-sung refrain.

"Change Your Life" is a midtempo, dubstep and hip-hop song set in the key of F-sharp minor. Also of the synthpop genre, its production is synth-heavy and driven by wobbling bass instruments. Andy Gill of The Independent writes that the track contains "psych-prog swirl". Azalea's fast-paced delivery pertains "swagger", and is bold in tone. In comparison with her previous works, Azalea's Southern American English pronunciation is toned down in the song. She also uses mantra-like chanting. Primarily melodic, "Change Your Life" features Azalea singing for the first time; she solicits a half-sung, half-spoken refrain. Her first verse opens with the lyrics, "You're used to dealing with basic bitches, basic shit, all the time". T.I. raps the song's second verse. Musically, the song was compared to productions by Skrillex, and Rihanna's "Pour It Up" (2013).

The song's lyrics contain an aspirational theme, and detail an argument of power and support roles in a relationship, with both Azalea and T.I. explaining their own beneficial traits to each other. Charlotte Richardson Andrews of NME called it "a class mobility fantasy", while John Lucas of The Georgia Straight denoted it as "a bite-sized motivational seminar". According to Azalea, the song is "a kind of rap duet" in which T.I. and herself "go back and forth". Azalea plays an accomplished woman aiming to positively influence her prospective partner's life, which she describes in one line as "[adding] muscle to [his] hustle". According to Monica Herrera of Rolling Stone the lyrics contain "a sturdy movin'-on-up hook". In the song's middle eight, Azalea assures her intentions with the lyrics, "Have you ever wished your life could change? / I could show you how to do this thing". Her rhymes specifically boast about her wealth and prowess, and the allure of international travel. T.I.'s verse includes a line about smoking marijuana, "I be blowing on strong weed when we ride". Lyrically, "Change Your Life" was compared to material by Kanye West, and Beyoncé's "Upgrade U" (2006).

== Release ==
Azalea originally intended "Change Your Life" to be her debut single, instead of "Work", but her label told her "it would be a waste of time because not enough people know about [her] for it to make proper impact". In March 2013, Azalea mentioned in an interview for Idol Magazine that her third single was a collaboration with T.I. and would feature her singing. She announced the song's title in May 2013, and later stated, "I'm most excited for this song and that's why I keep telling everyone about it". On 14 August 2013, Azalea posted the single's accompanying cover art on Twitter. In a black-and-white filter, it features Azalea striking a dramatic pose in a chain-mail bikini top. The single was premiered by BBC Radio 1Xtra on 19 August 2013.

"Change Your Life" was first made available for digital download in the United States on 12 September 2013, exclusively from the pre-order of an extended play (EP) of the same name. It impacted rhythmic contemporary radio in the country on 1 October 2013. A remix by Shift K3Y was premiered by T: The New York Times Style Magazine on 3 October 2013. The Change Your Life EP was released on 8 October 2013 as a digital download and CD; it included Azalea's previous singles "Work" and "Bounce", the Wale remix of the former, as well as remixes of "Change Your Life" by Shift K3Y and Wideboys. In an interview for Styleite, Azalea said that she did not consider it an EP artistically, but "something the label wanted to do to sell [the] single 500 million times". In the United Kingdom, "Change Your Life" and a three-track remix single including the Shift K3Y and Wideboys remixes was digitally released on 13 and 14 October 2013. A CD single which also featured a live performance of "Work" was made available on 14 October 2013. A solo version of "Change Your Life"—with an additional verse by Azalea replacing T.I.'s second verse—was released on 15 October 2013.

== Critical reception ==
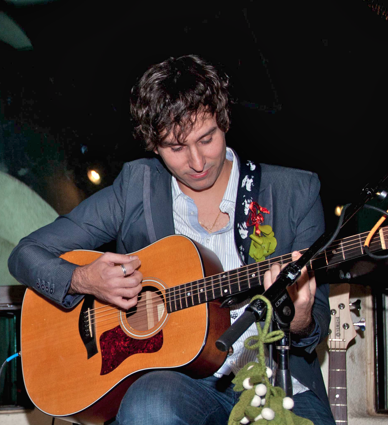
Adam Messinger won the Jack Richardson Producer of the Year Award at the Juno Awards of 2015 for his production on "Change Your Life".

"Change Your Life" was well received by most music critics. Robin Murray of Clash believed the track "could well rank as Azalea's most seductive moment yet", and commended its "impeccable" production. Julia Leconte of Now praised the song's catchy tune, while Sarah Dean of The Huffington Post felt it was Azalea's "most catchy song yet". Edwin Ortiz of Complex highlighted the song's "commendable blend" of genres and the "bold flare" of Azalea's rapping. AllMusic's David Jeffries deemed it a "true singalong" and a "tantalizing privileged party anthem". Charlotte Richardson Andrews of NME felt the track showcased Azalea's "wit, personality and lyrical prowess". Rhian Daly of the same publication noted, "She delivers her lines with such ballsy attitude it's easy to believe she's capabale of [changing lives]". Alex Scordelis of Paper found the song "inspirational". Laurence Day of The Line of Best Fit described it as a "Top 40-ravaging behemoth". Similarly, Kitty Empire of The Observer said it was "Azalea's most commercial single yet" and brought attention to Azalea's line "We spend our winters in the Summer of Australia / Eating crumpets with the sailors"; Empire named it as "perhaps the only hip-hop proto hit yet to contain a reference to crumpets". John Walker of MTV News also highlighted the crumpet reference, as well as Azalea's "lilting effortless swagger", and opined that the track was "indeed life-changing". Kevin Joy of The Columbus Dispatch echoed this view; he felt Azalea had "no shortage of swagger" and in turn made the song "saucy, strong-willed" and "so much fun".

Nolan Feeney of Time praised Azalea's conviction and "rapid-fire" delivery, and named the track as one of three highlights on The New Classic—a view echoed by Andy Gill of The Independent and Luke Winkie of The Austin Chronicle. Rory Cashin of State said the song was a "belter" and "the closest Iggy has yet come to a ballad". Eric Diep of XXL described the track as "infectious" and "anthemic", and believed it "kept expectations for [The New Classic] high". Jesal Padania of RapReviews.com said Azalea was "making the most of her strengths" on the song and remarked that "she by no means sounds out of place next to T.I.".

In a mixed review, Digital Spy's Robert Copsey gave "Change Your Life" a three (out of five) star-rating, and complimented its combination of Azalea's "ferocious rapping quirks with a hook-laden and radio friendly chorus", but felt the song "doesn't completely hit the spot". HipHopDX's Marcus Dowling wrote that "Change Your Life" was among two of Azalea's "most palatable tracks", but was skeptical of her accent and found the track to be "trite, yet contemporary". Less impressed, Troy L. Smith of The Plain Dealer said Azalea lacked T.I.'s charisma, and dismissed the song as "cliché-sounding". AbsolutePunk's Jake Jenkins called it "utterly unbearable".

== Commercial performance ==
In the United Kingdom, Music Week reported on 16 October 2013 that "Change Your Life" placed at number eight in the mid-week UK Singles Chart. However, the single's sales declined through the rest of the week and it entered the chart at number 10 with first-week sales of 26,622 copies. In its second week it sold 13,801 copies and dropped to number 27. The song marked Azalea's first top 10 hit in the country and spent a total of five weeks on the chart. "Change Your Life" became Azalea's second top 40 hit in Ireland where it debuted and peaked at number 28 on the Irish Singles Chart for the week-ending 17 October 2013. The track was also Azalea's first top 40 hit in New Zealand where it bowed at number 38 on the New Zealand Singles Chart dated 21 October 2013. In Australia, the song debuted and peaked at number 44 on the ARIA Singles Chart issued for 3 November 2013.

In the United States, "Change Your Life" first charted at number nine on the Bubbling Under R&B/Hip-Hop Singles chart dated 28 September 2013. The Change Your Life EP then entered the Top Heatseekers Albums and Top R&B/Hip-Hop Albums charts issued for 26 October 2013 at number 33 and number 66 respectively. The song later debuted at number 39 on the Rhythmic chart dated 16 November 2013, and went on to peak at number 37. Following the release of The New Classic, "Change Your Life" received a second chart resurgence; it debuted at number 47 on the Hot R&B/Hip-Hop Songs chart dated 10 May 2014, and peaked at number 34. It also reached number 22 on the Bubbling Under Hot 100 Singles chart for the week-ending 21 June 2014. In February 2015, "Change Your Life" was certified gold by the Recording Industry Association of America (RIAA) for selling 500,000 copies.

== Music video ==
=== Background and development ===
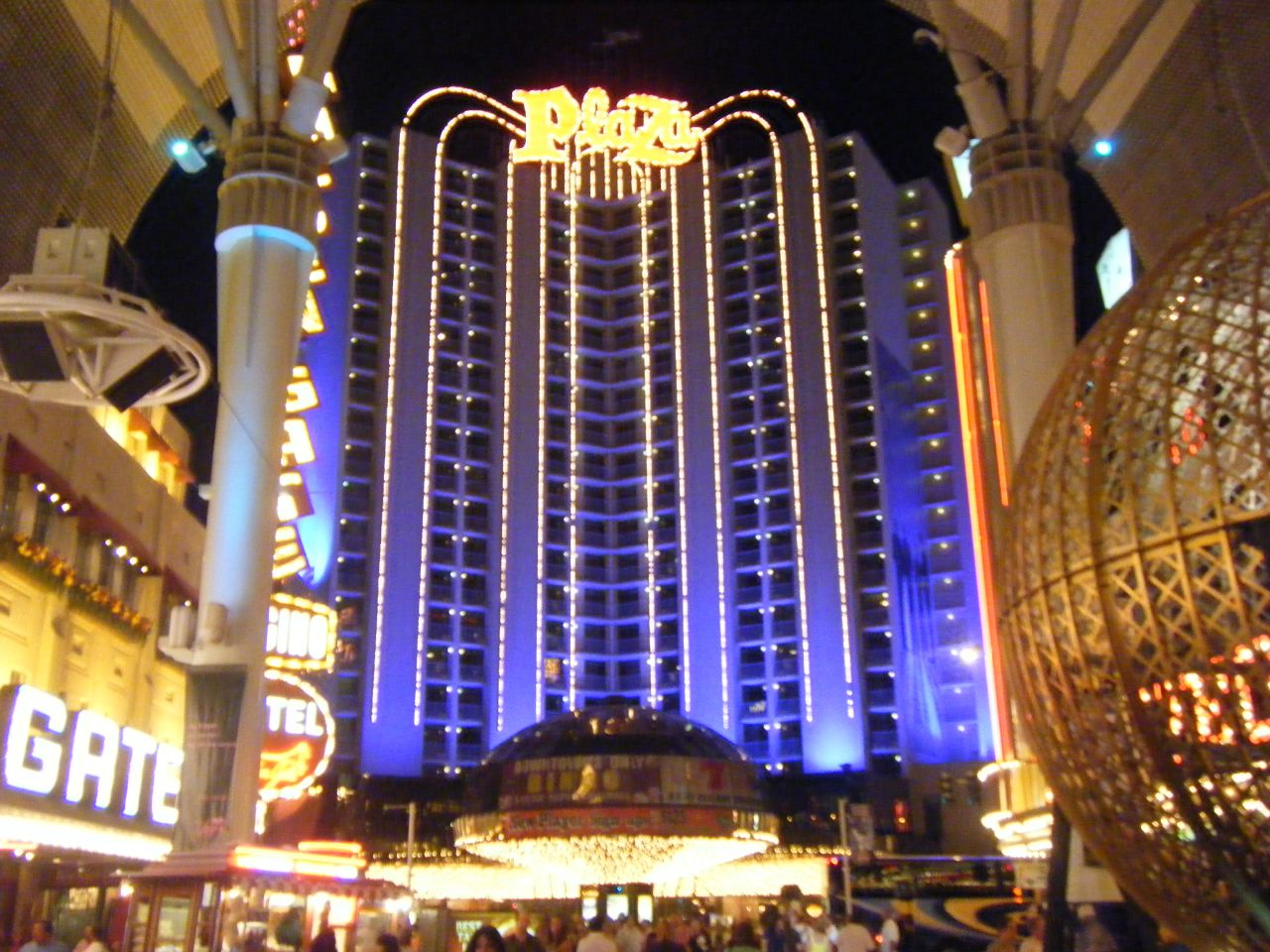
The Plaza Hotel & Casino, where some scenes from the music video were filmed

Azalea first revealed plans for "an epic music video" for "Change Your Life" in May 2013. It was filmed in Las Vegas over a two-day period beginning on 1 July 2013. The video was directed by Jonas & François who previously directed Azalea's video for "Work". Azalea was inspired by several films that were shot in Las Vegas which gave her the idea of having "a big show" for the "Change Your Life" music video; she felt it complemented the song's big, stadium-like feel. She recalled a past-time where she visited Las Vegas as a child and became fond of showgirls, and wanted the music video's storyline to revolve around a similar scenario. However, she felt the 1950s film and cabaret inspirations used to generally portray showgirls were "corny" and "overdone", and instead decided to obtain the music video's primary inspiration from the more "cool [and edgy]" 1995 film Showgirls.

Some of the video's scenes were shot at Cheetah's where Showgirls was filmed. The conceptual narrative of the music video's storyline was based on the film's character, Nomi (Elizabeth Berkley), which Azalea plays. Nomi's rebellious character contrasted with her dependence on a man and the casino in the film was one Azalea identified with as an artist dependent on her record label. Azalea also felt that Nomi's back-and-forth storyline in the film complemented the back-and-forth lyrical story of "Change Your Life". T.I. plays Nomi's boss and love interest. Azalea was also inspired the film's choreography which she felt was "so '80s and awful with these emphatic movements". The scene where Azalea emerges from the swimming pool topless with red pasties covering her nipples pays homage to a similar scene in Showgirls. Azalea explained, "So if I'm gonna do that movie, I can't leave out the best, most awesome, tacky, what-the-fuck moment". Azalea felt the scene was also important because she wanted to address recent criticism of her small breasts and use it as means of female empowerment for other women who deal with a similar issue.

Azalea found additional inspiration from the neon bulb lighting and visual elements in the 1995 film Casino. A scene in the music video recreates the film's characters Sam (Robert De Niro) and Ginger (Sharon Stone)'s house scenario, and was shot on the same location with the same swimming pool. A white tiger cub from a sanctuary outside Las Vegas was paid to appear in this scene; the fee paid for the cub's appearance went to the charity of its parent sanctuary. The cub was on set for about 12 hours. Other scenes in the video were filmed at the Plaza Hotel & Casino to depict Azalea's envisioned neon bulb lighting elements. A similar colour palette inspiration was obtained from the 1982 film Blade Runner, but darker in tone. Azalea was also fond of the film's combination of throwback hair styles and makeup with modern fashion; "it all created this kind of futuristic, throwback feel I wanted. I wanted some futuristic, throwback strippers". Azalea has a total of nine wardrobe changes in the video. She and T.I.'s wardrobe were coordinated by Alejandra Hernandez, and consisted of designs by Brioni, Giorgio Armani, Moschino, Patricia Field and Tom Ford. Upon the video's completion, Azalea felt confident in its rewatching value; "I think a great thing about a video is when there's so many things happening in it that you didn't get process all the information [and] want to watch it again".

=== Synopsis ===
The music video includes scenes at Cheetah's where the 1995 film Showgirls was shot, and features Azalea playing the film's character, Nomi.

The video opens with a view of a home's swimming pool and patio area where Azalea is pictured walking on a springboard and diving into the pool. This scene is intercut with images of her bedroom, a shattered painting of herself, and a whiskey glass dropping through a glass coffee table. Azalea is then shown lounging on the springboard; her hair is wet and slicked-back, and she wears a vintage bikini that has a transparent, chain-mail top and a red bottom. In another segment, she is dressed in a pink satin conical bra and high-waisted boyshorts, and is pictured writhing around on a pink satin bed alongside a white tiger cub. This scene is intercepted with Azalea emerging from the pool donning red pasties.

At the song's first chorus, Azalea is shown as a showgirl performing a burlesque routine on a neon-drenched stage, backed by a bevy of other platinum-wigged showgirls. She sports a sheer diamond bodysuit, a diamond choker, and a large, feathered headdress. Images of French playing cards, dollar bills and dice being thrown onto tables intercepts scenes through the rest of the video. Later, T.I. is shown smoking a cigar and wearing a suit, as he enter's Azalea's backstage dressing room. Close-ups of other showgirls are shown in this segment as Azalea looks at T.I. upset. The two are then pictured getting intimate together on the bonnet of a red Mercedes-Benz outside the bar where Azalea performed. In this scene, Azalea is dressed in a crimson, double-belter half-jacket over a black-and-pink two-piece swimsuit.

In the next segment, Azalea reprises another on-stage showgirl performance, this time superimposed in glitter and flames. She is now pictured in a friendlier mood backstage, trying on a Lucite cowboy hat and applying mascara. The video's plot twist occurs with Azalea—in a white pantsuit—being handcuffed and escorted out a casino by two policeman into the backseat of their vehicle. This scene is intercut with Azalea dancing in the bar's parking lot and lounging on car with the registration "T.I. Nevada". She wears a rhinestone-encrusted crop top, gloves, a polyvinyl chloride miniskirt with garters, and thigh-high boots. Azalea then smashes a money-filled suitcase open onto the car's windscreen and sets it alight and walks away. The video ends with a showgirl performance of Azalea being completely superimposed in flames.

=== Release and reception ===
Azalea first posted images from the set online on 3 July 2013. She shared preview images of the clip on Instagram on 23 July 2013. The video premiered on Vevo on 8 September 2013. Upon release, it was tagged "not suitable for work" on YouTube because of Azalea's topless scene. Azalea refused to upload a clean version of the video to YouTube as she felt it would detract from the vision she had for it; this drew viewers to the video's explicit version on Vevo instead. The Daily Telegraph said the video "caused an internet storm" and became the number one trending topic worldwide on Twitter, with Azalea encouraging women who have smaller breasts to embrace themselves with the hashtag "#FashionTits". The campaign was praised by Lily Allen and Angel Haze. The music video received acclaim from critics and was nominated in the category for Best Urban Video at the 2014 UK Music Video Awards, but lost to J. Cole's "She Knows". VH1 ranked the video seventh in their list of The 15 Sexiest Music Videos of 2013; writer Jordan Runtagh stated that it was one of "the more 'uniquely hot' clips" on their list. Several critics noticed similarities between Azalea's sheer diamond bodysuit in the video and the one in Britney Spears' "Toxic" (2004).

Gregory Adams of Exclaim! called the video "glamorous", and felt it was an "ode to luxury", and Azalea's topless scene paid homage to that of Phoebe Cates' in the 1982 film Fast Times at Ridgemont High. Oyster described it as "hella good", and echoed Gracie's sentiment: "['Change Your Life'] sees her continuing her tradition of making clips that aren't just sexy—they've got cinematic chutzpa too. You know, story lines and all that." While Matia Peebles of The Source commented, "When it comes to videos, Iggy's imagery is always on something to experience".

Alex Scordelis of Paper also said it was "cinematic", and that it "brought [the song] to life". Nick Catucci of Entertainment Weekly opined that Azalea's "quirky charisma [was] on full display" in the visual. XXL wrote that there was no reason not to watch the clip; "[Azalea] definitely changes lives after this clip looking hot as ever". Parry Ernsberger of MTV News said Azalea "ups the wardrobe ante" in the video, and deemed her "the ultimate showgirl" and the visual a "cinematic mini-film". Georgina Langford of the same publication quipped, "It's no-hold-barred for the latest Iggy Azalea extravaganza", and praised Azalea's acting in the "showgirl spectacular". Victoria Kezra of The Daily Beast called it "a compact retelling of the best bad movie of all time". While Steff Yotka of Nylon praised Azalea's fashion and portrayal, and likened her pantsuit in the music video to the one in No Doubt's "It's My Life" (2003). In a Billboard publication, Robert Christgau noted that the video showcased Azalea as "always the striving self-creator pursuing her 'art', as [she] rightly calls it".

The music video was, in France, broadcast after 10 p.m. with a warning Not advised to kids under 12 years old (déconseillé aux moins de 12 ans in French) and with or without blurring in most of music channels following Azalea's topless scene, nudity overall and sexual explicit content.

== Live performances ==
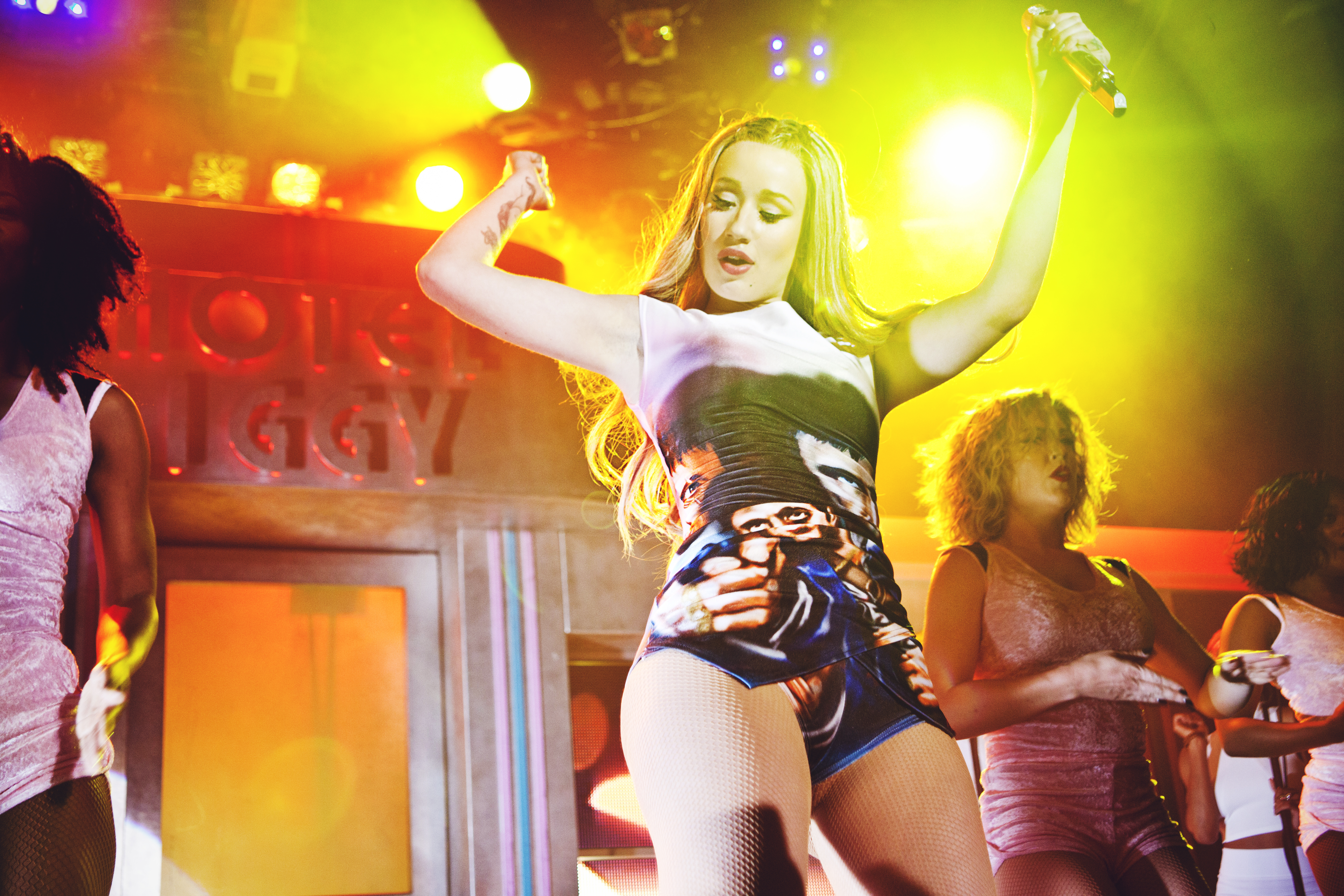
Azalea performing "Change Your Life" during The New Classic Tour (2014)

Azalea first performed the solo version of "Change Your Life" as part of her setlist for the iTunes Festival in September 2013, where she was an opening act for Katy Perry. Azalea and T.I. gave their first live, televised performance of the song on 106 & Park on 3 October 2013. The following day, Azalea performed the solo version of the track on Fuse's Trending 10 and on Alan Carr: Chatty Man. On 9 October 2013, she performed the song for BBC Radio 1Xtra. At the 2013 MOBO Awards, Azalea performed "Change Your Life" and "Work". Azalea also included the track as part of her sets during Beyoncé's The Mrs. Carter Show World Tour. In Australia, Azalea performed "Change Your Life" live on Wake Up on 13 November 2013. Azalea and T.I. performed the track on The Late Show with David Letterman on 28 November 2013, backed by a live band.

== Formats and track listings ==
- CD single
1. "Change Your Life" (featuring T.I.) – 3:40
2. "Work" (Vevo Stripped Version) – 3:55
- Digital download
1. "Change Your Life" (featuring T.I.) – 3:40
- Digital download
1. "Change Your Life" (Iggy Only Version) – 3:40
- Digital download (Remixes)
1. "Change Your Life" (featuring T.I.) [Maddslinky Remix] – 5:41
2. "Change Your Life" (featuring T.I.) [Shift K3Y Remix] – 5:20
3. "Change Your Life" (featuring T.I.) [Wideboys Remix] – 6:04
- EP
1. "Change Your Life" (featuring T.I.) – 3:40
2. "Work" – 3:43
3. "Bounce" – 2:47
4. "Work" (featuring Wale) – 4:10
5. "Change Your Life" (featuring T.I.) [Shift K3Y Remix] – 5:20
6. "Change Your Life" (featuring T.I.) [Wideboys Remix] – 6:04

== Credits and personnel ==
- Iggy Azalea – writer, vocals, background vocals
- T.I. – writer, vocals
- Natalie Sims – writer
- Raja Kumari – writer, background vocals
- The Messengers – writers, producers
- Lovy Longomba – writer
- Elliot Carter – vocal engineering
- Jaycen Joshua – mixing
- Ryan Kaul – mixing assistant
- Stuart Hawkes – mastering

Credits adapted from the album's liner notes.

== Charts ==
Chart (2013–14)	Peak position
Australia (ARIA)	44
Australia Urban (ARIA)	5
Belgium (Ultratip Bubbling Under Flanders)	56
Belgium Urban (Ultratop Flanders)	44
Ireland (IRMA)	28
New Zealand (Recorded Music NZ)	38
Scottish Singles Sales (Official Charts)	12
UK Singles (Official Charts)	10
UK Hip Hop/R&B (Official Charts)	3
US Bubbling Under Hot 100 Singles (Billboard)	22
US Hot R&B/Hip-Hop Songs (Billboard)	34
US Rhythmic (Billboard)	37
US Heatseekers Albums (Billboard) Change Your Life EP	33
US Top R&B/Hip-Hop Albums (Billboard) Change Your Life EP	66

== Certifications ==
Region	Certification	Certified units/sales
Australia (ARIA)	Gold	35,000^{^}
Brazil (Pro-Música Brasil)	Gold	30,000^{‡}
New Zealand (RMNZ)	Gold	15,000^{‡}
United Kingdom (BPI)	Silver	200,000^{‡}
United States (RIAA)	Gold	500,000^{‡}
^{^} Shipments figures based on certification alone.^{‡} Sales+streaming figures based on certification alone.

== Radio and release history ==
Country	Date	Format	Label	Ref.
United States	12 September 2013	Digital download	Def Jam	
United States	1 October 2013	Rhythmic contemporary	Def Jam	
United States	8 October 2013	EP	Def Jam	
United Kingdom	13 October 2013	Digital download	Virgin EMI	
United Kingdom	13 October 2013	Digital download (Remixes)	Virgin EMI	
United Kingdom	14 October 2013	CD single	Virgin EMI	
United Kingdom	15 October 2013	Digital download (Iggy Only Version)	Virgin EMI	
United States	5 November 2013	Digital download (Iggy Only Version)	Def Jam	

== See also ==
- List of UK top 10 singles in 2013
