= Lovy Elias =

Congolese Kenyan pastor and musician

Lovy L. Elias
- Title: Prophet

Personal life
- Born: Lovy Longomba Elias; 25 November 1986 (age 39) Africa
- Partner: Maggy Elias
- Children: 2
- Other name: Prophet Lovy

Religious life
- Religion: Christianity
- Denomination: Non-denominational Charismatic/Pentecostal
- Church: Revelation Church of Jesus Christ
- Profession: Pastor

Senior posting
- Based in: Simi Valley, California
- Website: prophetlovy.com

Lovy Longomba Elias (born 25 November 1986), also known as Prophet Lovy Elias also known by his stage name Lovy Longomba, is a Kenyan Congolese (DRCongo)-American pastor, producer, songwriter, musician, and life coach.

== Early life ==
Lovy Longomba Elias was born on November 25, 1986, in Nairobi, Kenya. He is of East African and Congolese ancestry. His father Lovy Longomba Sr. was a member of Orchestra Super Mazembe, a Congolese band, and his grandfather Vicky Longomba was a member of TPOK Jazz.

Elias started his musical career after high school and co-founded a hip hop/soukous musical group called Longombas, with his brother Christian and cousin Masengo.The group entered the Kenyan music scene in 2002 with their song "Dondosa", which became a national hit. Follow-up singles were "Piga Makofi", "Shika More" and "Vuta Pumz". Their debut album Chukua was released in 2005 by Ogopa DJs.[3] In 2003, they left Ogopa DJs record label together with Deux Vultures and Mr. Googz & Vinnie Banton, and formed their own label, Bad Man Camp. Deux Vultures and the Longombas, however, later returned to Ogopa [4] The group has won several awards in Kenya.

In 2007, Elias and his brother relocated to Los Angeles, CA, where the group was disbanded. He became a pastor and focused only on writing and producing for established artists. In 2014, Elias was recognized as one of the producers and songwriters for "Change Your Life" by Iggy Azalea, which was nominated for a Grammy Award.

== Revelation Church of Jesus Christ ==
In 2013, Elias started a prayer group in Woodland Hills, CA. He held weekly teachings, bible studies, and fellowship in his living room. Later, Elias established Revelation Church of Jesus Christ.

By 2016, Elias began renting out space in Van Nuys, CA, to accommodate their needs. On July 14, 2016, Elias started holding fellowships in Van Nuys, CA. In 2017, he founded Revelation Church of Jesus Christ and led sermons as head pastor. The congregation has grown to more than a thousand members with more online. Elias is also a life coach to celebrities and athletes. On April 3, 2019, Elias started live streaming his teachings on platforms such as YouTube and Facebook. Elias regularly live streams his teachings, with past teachings archived on YouTube. On Feb 7, 2021, Elias relocated Revelation Church of Jesus Christ's headquarters and worship centre to Simi Valley, CA.

== Personal life ==
Elias was married to the former Idah (née Onyango) Longomba. They have a son, Andrew. On June 16, 2017, he filed for a dissolution of marriage with a minor child in Los Angeles Superior Court. In 2020, Elias legally changed his full name to Lovy Elias. He is currently married to Maggy Kria Soas as of 2023. His brother, Christian Hulu Longomba, born on June 30, 1984, died March 12, 2021, in Los Angeles, after a long illness.

On April 3, 2021, Elias received an honorary doctoral degree from Next Dimension University, an unaccredited religious school and church in Los Angeles, CA.

== Songwriting and producing ==
| Title | Year | Artist(s) |
|---|---|---|
| "Change Your Life (Iggy Azalea song)" | 2013 | Iggy Azalea, T.I. |
| "The New Classic" | 2014 | Iggy Azalea |
| "Pitch Perfect 2 (soundtrack)" | 2015 | Iggy Azalea |
| "More Issues Than Vogue" | 2016 | K.Michelle |
| "Youth (Tinie Tempah album)" | 2017 | Tinie Tempah |
