= Fly Panda =

American pop group

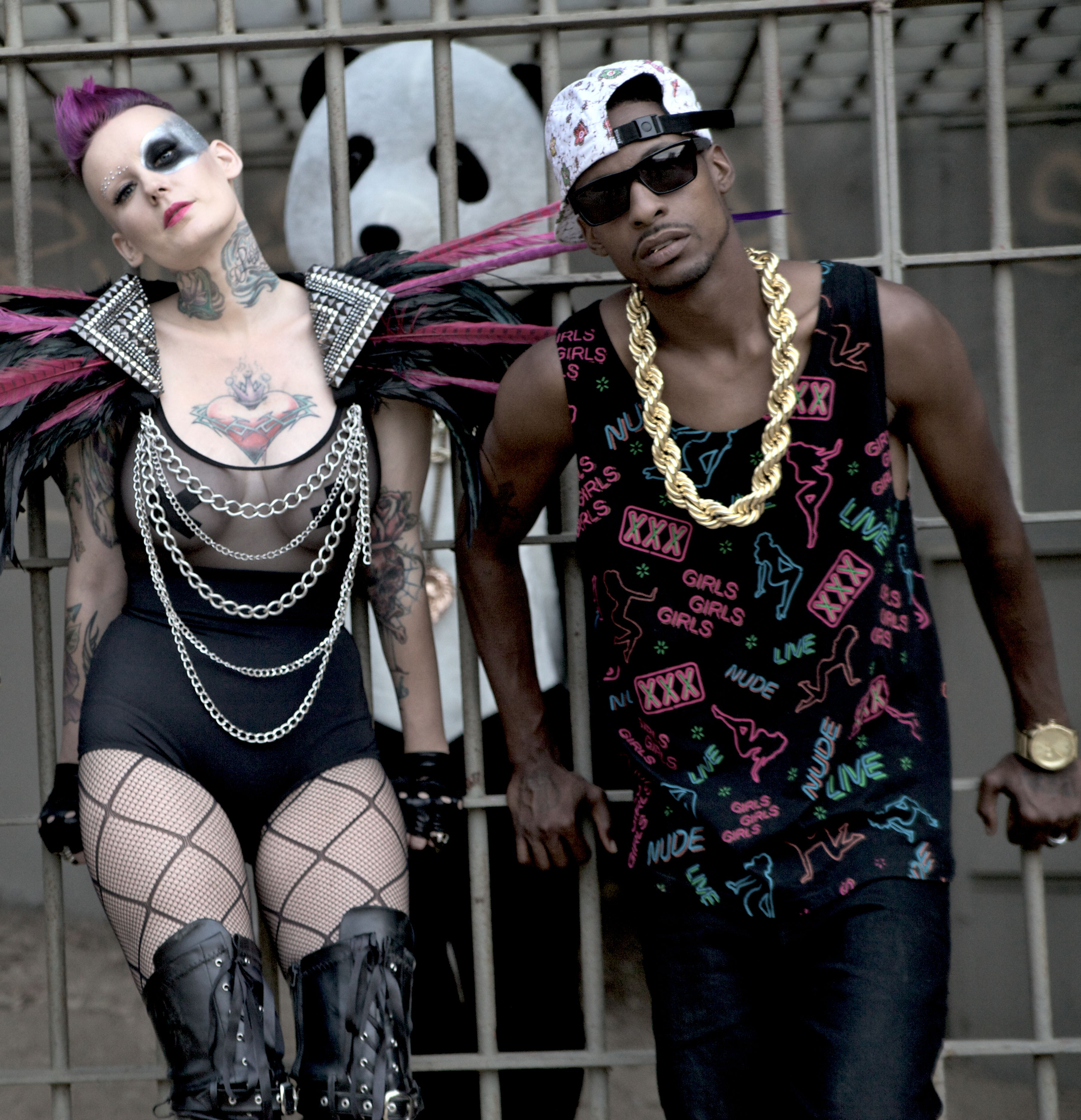
- Fly Panda 2012 Promotional Photo

Background information
- Origin: Los Angeles, California, U.S.
- Genres: Pop, dubstep, hip hop
- Years active: 2012–present
- Label: Fly Panda Music Group
- Members: Lukas Ka$h; Winter Rae
- Website: www.flypandamusic.com

Fly Panda is an American pop group formed in 2012 by rapper Lukas Ka$h and singer Winter Rae in Los Angeles, California. Fly Panda is known for their recently launched #STUNT movement with its "Call Me Crazy" teaser video.

== History ==
=== Formation ===
Lukas Ka$h (born in Watts, California) and Winter Rae (born in Persia, Iowa) were already familiar with each other's work before becoming a group in 2012. Lukas Ka$h (F.k.a STIX or Brandon “STIX” Salaam Bailey) was fresh off his success with executive producing and touring with the Australian hip-hop recording artist Iggy Azalea when he ran into Winter Rae outside a strip club in Tijuana, Mexico. Winter had left Los Angeles and was starting a new life after being eliminated after only one episode on NBC's The Voice They formed an instant bond and decide to start working together immediately. During their first studio session, a short mysterious man walked into their room. That man was Cory Bold, known for his production for artists such as Marques Houston and Keri Hilson. Cory was on his way to a tanning salon, but accidentally entered the wrong building. Cory played a few of his tracks, which impressed Winter and Lukas so much that they invited him to stay for lunch. They ordered some burritos and decided to record the song to their viral YouTube video “Call Me Crazy.” A few weeks after, the video was shot by Falkon and Blk Bart, the same production team responsible for Iggy Azalea’s “Pussy” music video.

To date, it is unclear if the panda mascot, referred to often as "Maurice" is actually the third member of the group or just a stalker.

=== 2012-Present: Pandamonium EP ===
After the positive feedback from their YouTube video Call Me Crazy in 2012, Fly Panda began recording their Pandamonium EP. The EP was produced by Cory Bold, who is also featured in the group's first full-length video for their single, "Face Drop". Pandamonium was released on May 20, 2012 exclusively by MTV.com and was also posted on celebrity blogger Perez Hilton’s website. The EP was downloaded 40,000+ times the first week of the release and grabbed attention from many prominent artist in the entertainment industry.

== Members ==
- Lukas Ka$h - Rapper, Songwriter
- Winter Rae - Vocalist, Songwriter
- Maurice the Panda - Bleezy

== Discography ==
Studio albums

- Pandamonium (2013)
- Pandamonium 2.0 (TBD)
