= The New Classic =

2014 album by Iggy Azalea

Studio album by Iggy Azalea
- Released: 21 April 2014
- Recorded: 2012–2013
- Studios: British Grove Studios (London, England); Conway Recording Studios (Los Angeles, CA); Nightbird Recording Studios (Los Angeles, CA); Freedom Ville (Atlanta, GA); Monnow Valley Studio (Wales); Rockfield Studios (Wales); Jungle City Studios (New York, NY); Westlake Recording Studios (Los Angeles, CA); Young Boss Vuitton Studios (Miami, FL)
- Genre: Hip-hop
- Length: 42:03
- Labels: Grand Hustle; Def Jam; Virgin EMI
- Producers: FKi 1st; The Arcade; Joey Dyer; The Invisible Men; The Messengers; Reeva & Black; Stargate; Watch the Duck

Iggy Azalea chronology
TrapGold (2012)	The New Classic (2014)	Reclassified (2014)

Iggy Azalea album chronology
The New Classic (2014)	In My Defense (2019)

Singles from The New Classic
- 1. "Work" Released: 17 March 2013; 2. "Bounce" Released: 27 May 2013; 3. "Change Your Life" Released: 12 September 2013; 4. "Fancy" Released: 17 February 2014; 5. "Black Widow" Released: 8 July 2014

The New Classic is the debut studio album by Australian rapper Iggy Azalea. It was released on 21 April 2014 by Def Jam Recordings in a joint venture with Grand Hustle Records, alongside Virgin EMI Records. The album was produced by FKi 1st, The Invisible Men, The Messengers, and Stargate, alongside others. Co-producers Watch the Duck and musicians such as T.I., Charli XCX, Rita Ora, Mavado, and Wiley provided vocal features on the project. The album was recorded from 2012 to 2013 in numerous studios across the United Kingdom and the United States of America, and is her first overall project since her second mixtape TrapGold (2012). Primarily a hip-hop album, The New Classic also features elements of EDM, dance-pop and trap in its production.

The album produced five singles in total. "Work", "Bounce" (exclusive to the deluxe), and "Change Your Life" were released as the first three singles all of which attained commercial success on charts worldwide. The fourth single "Fancy" featuring British singer-songwriter Charli XCX was an international success, reaching the top five in Australia and the United Kingdom, and peaking at number one in New Zealand, the United States and Canada. The fifth single, "Black Widow" featuring British singer Rita Ora peaked at number 4 in the United Kingdom. It became Azalea's highest-charting single as a lead artist on that chart, and also peaked at number 3 in the United States, while receiving mixed reviews from music critics. A promotional single was also released for the album, "Impossible Is Nothing".

The album debuted at number three on the Billboard 200 chart, with first-week sales of 52,000 copies in the United States. The New Classic was the highest-charting female rap album since Nicki Minaj's Pink Friday: Roman Reloaded (2012) and the highest chart entry for a female rapper's debut album since Minaj's Pink Friday (2010) entered at number two. The album also moved up to number one on the Billboard Top R&B/Hip-Hop Albums and Top Rap Albums, making Azalea the first non-American female rapper to reach the summit of these charts.

The New Classic won the Breakthrough Artist Release at the ARIA Music Awards of 2014 and Favorite Rap/Hip-Hop Album at the 2014 American Music Awards. The album also garnered Azalea four Grammy Award nominations for Best New Artist, Record of the Year and Best Pop Duo/Group Performance for "Fancy" and Best Rap Album at the 57th Grammy Awards. The New Classic was later reissued in a repackaged version, titled Reclassified, which featured the singles "Beg for It" (featuring MØ) and "Trouble" (featuring Jennifer Hudson), alongside the promotional single "Iggy SZN". To promote the album, Azalea embarked on her first headlining concert tour, entitled The New Classic Tour. The Great Escape Tour was planned for Reclassified, but it was soon cancelled.

In August 2014, the album was certified Gold in Canada and in November 2014, it was also certified gold in Australia (Azalea's home country). In April 2016, it was certified platinum by the Recording Industry Association of America (RIAA). The album was named the second most-streamed album of the year overall in the US, third in the UK and globally on commercial music streaming service Spotify in 2014. On the 2nd of February, 2015, it received a Platinum award from Universal Music Colombia. The New Classic also received a Platinum award from Universal Music Brazil, along with its repack Reclassified, on the 8th of November, 2015.

== Background ==
After releasing her first full-length project, a mixtape Ignorant Art (2011) and a music video for a song titled "Pu$$y" that went viral, Iggy Azalea found prominence in the music industry and went on to become both the first female and first non-American rapper selected for hip hop magazine XXL's annual Top 10 Freshman cover issue. The major attention led to negotiations for a record deal with Interscope Records. In December 2011, in an interview, Azalea revealed her debut album's title to be The New Classic and that she had hopes of releasing it in the first quarter of 2012. She also stated she would be signing to a major record label "soon and once that's sorted out and I establish an over all sound and direction for the album, I will be able to know what artists would make for a dynamic collaboration". Azalea later explained the concept behind her debut album's title: "I think people think of classic and they think of a Nas record or a Jay Z record or The Chronic, what makes something classic is when you hear it and you have that moment that is a time capsule. When I say 'The New Classic,' I just want to make records that give you that moment for fans that they can remember where they were when they heard it."

I think some people think I'm like anti-label and I'm not. I just wanted to sign a deal when the time was right. I'm anti being shot out of a rocket when you're not ready and the songs and image aren't there. I think labels are skipping on the whole development side of an artist so you have to do it yourself these days. I wasn't ready to make an album last year, but now we've taken our time with everything the timing feels right.

— Azalea, discussing her stance on signing to a major record label, Digital Spy.

In January 2012, Azalea announced via Twitter, that she had struck a deal with Jimmy Iovine resulting in her being signed to Interscope Records. Azalea went on to state: "Interscope, if you were wondering [...] Get used to me + jimmy smashing [shit], cause thats the plan". However, in the following weeks she announced to MTV News, that American rapper T.I. had contacted her in relation to working with her as an executive producer of her upcoming album, although T.I. later stated it was Azalea who had asked him to be part of the record. Both T.I. and Azalea discussed their encounter to MTV News, in which Azalea claimed that he reached out to work with her, and she "found a position for him", T.I. recalled their first conversation in which she told him "it's very smart of you to call me because I'm going to be smashing shit for quite some time". In March 2012, T.I. announced he signed Iggy Azalea to Grand Hustle Records. In May 2012, it was confirmed by T.I., on MTV's HipHopPov, that Azalea had not yet secured distribution for her deal with Grand Hustle Records, and was described by T.I. as a "free agent". It was later revealed in the interview that she was in negotiations with labels other than Interscope and possibly Def Jam (wherein Bu Thiam, whom of which originally placed a bid to sign her, is VP of A&R). In an interview with Interview magazine, Azalea clarified her move from Interscope Records to Grand Hustle Records, she called the signing "very impersonal" feeling that she "was a product" and after meeting T.I. she felt that he cared and understood her as a rap artist rather than her commercial viability. Azalea worried that if she was to make a mistake with her career that Interscope Records would not support her, and she felt that being signed to the label was for commercial reasons rather than artistic.

On 13 February 2013, it was announced Azalea had signed a record deal with Mercury Records. Despite announcing she was part of T.I.'s Grand Hustle imprint, it was then confirmed that she had signed a deal with Island Def Jam Music Group, she announced via Twitter: "Hey world. I signed to island def jam. Iam now mercury UK/ island def jam USA awesome!!!!". It was then stated that her deal with Interscope was never finalized and that she was only affiliated with Grand Hustle Records, and Azalea clarified her affiliation with the label saying: "That doesn't mean I'm not in Hustle Gang. Save it. Still in it. Still on the hustle gang album. Friendship doesn't require contracts". Chris Anokute, a senior vice president of Island Def Jam, later welcomed her to the record label tweeting: "Congrats Iggy. You have a voice that needs to be heard. We got your back". In an interview with Blare magazine, Azalea explained that Island Def Jam made her feel more confident as a musician, and she felt less pressure from them as a company.

== Recording and production ==
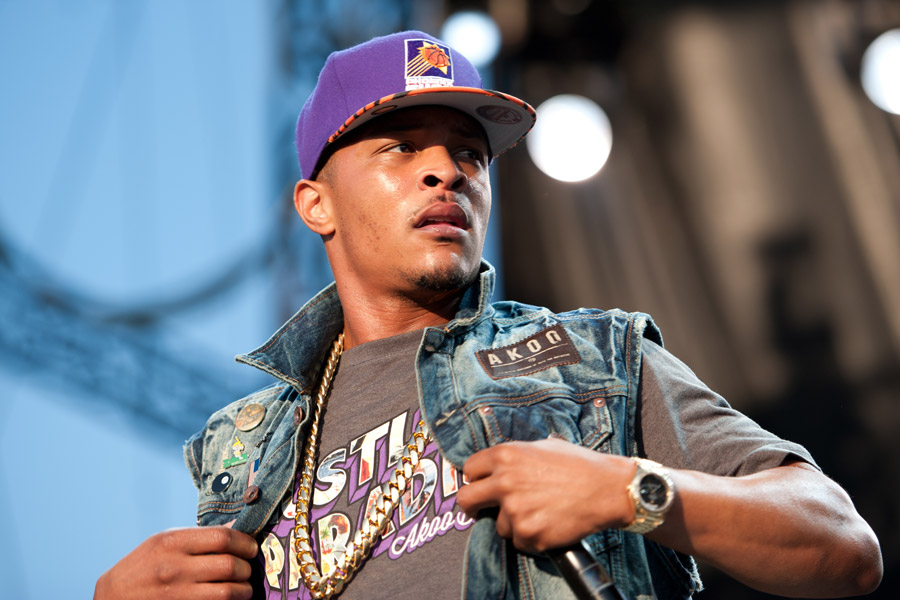
American rapper T.I., who is also Azalea's mentor, appears as a featured artist on the album.

In an interview with 16Bars.TV (released in 2013), Azalea revealed that although she is still signed to T.I.'s Grand Hustle imprint, he would no longer be executive producer of her debut album: "He's actually not, anymore," Azalea said when asked about T.I.'s role. "He was going to be, but originally...all the records that I had on Glory [EP] were supposed to be on The New Classic, and he executive produced what ended up being Glory." Azalea said that artistically, both she and T.I. agreed that she needed to go in a different direction with her debut: "As I was making it, I felt like, 'This isn't The New Classic; this is something else. It's not the right sound.' Not that it sounded bad, but it wasn't what The New Classic is in my head. And he executive produced that, and that went good, it was an experience, but after, he said and I said, it's better if I just make my own music away [from him] because sometimes being around him, it influences the music I make to be a bit too much of a different sound, and so for that reason he's not going to be [executive producing]. But not because I don't love him, because I love him." Azalea also said she would be working with producers such as Diplo, Steve Aoki and Flosstradamus on the album, which she said she began working with earlier in December.

In February 2012, Azalea premiered a song titled "Picture Me Rollin", performing it in Los Angeles in Dim Mak Studio. The song, which was set to be included on the album, was produced by Canadian record producer Boi-1da. In April 2012, Azalea revealed she had collaborated with R&B singer Trey Songz: "I did do a song with Trey Songz that's kind of unexpected," she told The Boombox. "The beat, and the way he sings, it's kind of different [from] his regular style. I'm going to put that out, probably before the album." The album, which at the time set to be an Interscope Records release, would represent her different sides: "Some stuff is very base-driven, stripped down, more southern-sounding. Then other stuff is more mood and closer to my ignorant [side]," shared Azalea. "I kind of like have two different zones. It's ratchet, then introspective, I guess. Those are the two sounds, and I'm trying to glue all the things together, and find things that will make it cohesive."

In 2012, Azalea later mentioned the collaborations with Cee-Lo Green and Pusha T, would probably make it to the album's final track list. She had also revealed hopes of a collaboration with Missy Elliott, stating: "working with her is definitely something that I'm going to try to do before I put The New Classic out." Natalie Sims, whom Azalea had worked with in Atlanta before relocating to Los Angeles, abandoned the last four stops on a tour and flew over to Wales in December to help record the album. Sims co-wrote the songs "Work", "Change Your Life", "Bounce", "Just Askin'", and "New Bitch". Also in December, via her Twitter feed, Azalea revealed she would be remaking a song titled "Home Town Hatred", for the album. Azalea also confirmed Tyga and Rita Ora, as possible features that will be included on the album. On 13 March 2013, after she released the music video for the lead single "Work", it was reported Azalea was working on her debut album in the United Kingdom.

== Composition ==
During her headlining European tour in December, Azalea spoke on the album's composition: "It's going to be similar to TrapGold and that will be very electronic and high-energy but I'm gonna talk more about my story and where I'm from and things about myself because I never really say that, I don't tell you too much about me, it's kind of just talking a lot of shit. It's what I really do, like energy and dance... but I do wanna touch on who I am and tell my story because I feel like I have a really interesting story and a lot of people don't know that because a lot of people don't see the interviews and I would like to put it in my music that I've been waiting for the right time for something that I feel like people will hear in the right platform and I think it will be this album so the near future will just be trying to tell my story in that album next year." In an interview with Billboard, released in August 2013, Azalea described the album as "fairly electronic, like moombahton mixed with hip hop".

== Release and promotion ==
On 27 September 2011, Azalea released her debut mixtape Ignorant Art, saying she made it "with the intent to make people question and redefine old ideals". On 30 July 2012, she released a free extended play (EP) titled Glory. On 27 January 2012, Azalea confirmed she had finally signed to Interscope Records and her debut album The New Classic, which would be released in June 2012, with a debut single (which preceding in March 2012). On 11 October 2012, Azalea released her second mixtape, TrapGold. TrapGold features the new direction Azalea began to go with her music at the time.

During January and February 2013, Azalea was the supporting act for British singer-songwriter Rita Ora's Radioactive Tour in the United Kingdom. During March 2013, Azalea was the supporting act for American rapper Nas, on his Life Is Good concert tour in the United Kingdom. In June 2013, Azalea stated she had completed the album and it was set to be released in September 2013. On 8 August 2013 Azalea unveiled the album's tentative track-listing, which included neither "Work" nor "Bounce". During an October 2013 interview, Azalea talked about the album's release date:

The official date? [Fucked] if I know! It's done, it's so depressing to say this but it's the beginning of March, it's so far away but I just have to accept that. It was supposed to be October but obviously I'm going on tour with Beyoncé and they said I'm not allowed to put an album out while I'm on tour because I'll be trapped in Australia and I won't be able to do any TV appearances and I thought that's fair enough, that's three weeks and then they said 'You can't put an album out around Christmas time, that's a bad time' and I said 'What about January?' 'Well nobody gets back off holidays and then it's the Brit Awards, you can't release an album, it's terrible for marketing' which brings me to February. The marketing team gets to control me unfortunately, I don't get to control that.

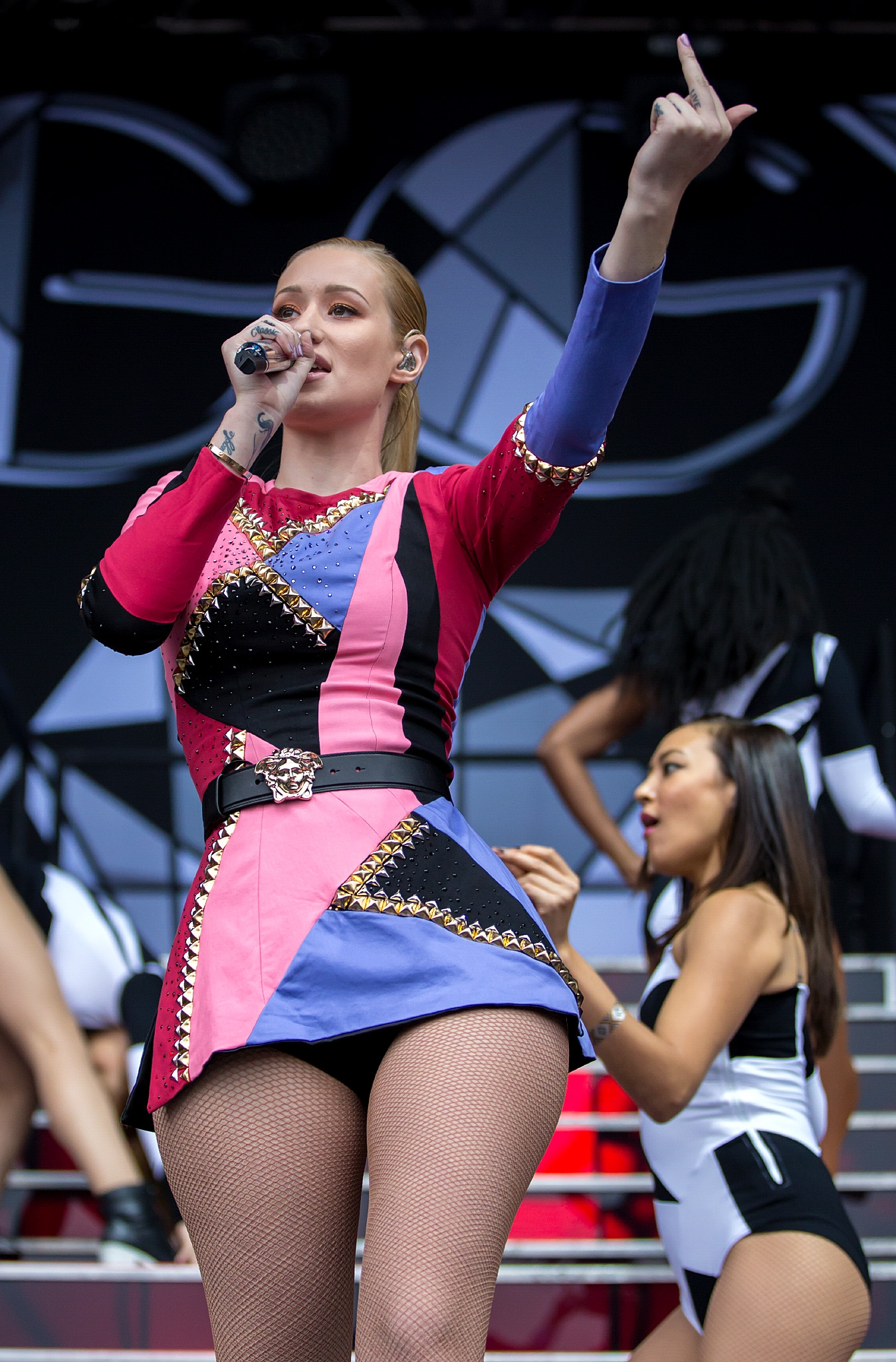
Azalea performing "Fuck Love" at the ACL Music Festival in October 2014

During October and November 2013, Azalea was the supporting act for American singer-songwriter Beyoncé's The Mrs. Carter Show World Tour in Australia. On 8 January 2014, in promotion for her album, Azalea released a freestyle over "Animal Noise", which was produced by EDM producer Bro Safari. On 26 January 2014, during an interview at the 56th Annual Grammy Awards, Azalea announced that The New Classic would be released on 14 April 2014.

On 26 February 2014, in an interview with Los Angeles radio station Power 106, Azalea spoke on her long-awaited and often-delayed album: "In a way I'm very glad that it has taken a long time, because I've had so many experiences and I really feel like the last two years have been fast-forwarded and I had just so many different things happen to me that's been a lot of great things to write about..."

The album became available for pre-order 10 March 2014, along with an instant gratification track, "Fancy" or "Impossible Is Nothing", depending on the country. The album was officially released on 21 April in the United Kingdom, 22 April in the United States and 25 April in Australia.

=== Tour ===
To promote the album, Azalea announced a 14-date North American tour kicking off on 23 April in Boston and stopping in major cities including Detroit, Chicago, New York, Atlanta, and Los Angeles, wrapping 22 May in Seattle. She also planned to tour festivals throughout the summer.

== Singles ==
Azalea released "Work", her commercial debut single on 17 March 2013. The song, produced by 1st Down and The Invisible Men, serves as the album's lead single. It was described as a subdued trap-meets-snap tune about Azalea's peculiar coming-of-age as a model who came to America in her teens before trying her hand at rap ("no money / no family / 16 in the middle of Miami"). Commercially the song performed well, charting within the top twenty in the UK charts and within the top three of the UK R&B charts, as well as managing to chart in Australia, Ireland and Scotland. The music video for the song was shot in the last week of February 2013 and premiered 13 March 2013, on VEVO. Directed by Jonas & François, the video "is all trailer park elegance, dive bar lap dances, and a bit of 'Bad Girls'-inspired ridin' around and/or gettin' it". Azalea revealed the inspirations for the visuals included Fear and Loathing in Las Vegas, The Adventures of Priscilla, Queen of the Desert, Tarantino's Death Proof and the music video for Outkast's "B.O.B.". On 17 July 2013, MTV announced Azalea's "Work" video had been nominated for the "Artist To Watch" category at the 2013 MTV Video Music Awards. In 2014, "Work" received a resurgence in popularity in the United States, following Azalea's simultaneous success with The New Classic, "Fancy" and "Problem". It re-entered Billboard Bubbling Under Hot 100 Singles at a position of number three on 10 May 2014, before entering the Billboard Hot 100 at number 88, and re-entering at a new peak of number 24 on Billboard Hot R&B/Hip-Hop Songs the week after. "Work" also debuted at number 14 on Billboard Hot Rap Songs for the week ending 17 May 2014, marking Azalea's second top 20 hit on that chart.

The second single released in anticipation of the album was "Bounce", which premiered on BBC Radio 1 on 26 April 2013. The song was released via digital distribution on 27 May 2013. The music video for "Bounce" was filmed in April 2013 in Mumbai and premiered 6 May 2013, on VEVO. The video, which was directed by BRTHR Films, is Bollywood-themed. "Bounce" served as the album's second single in Europe and Australia, while "Change Your Life", was released as the second single in North America. The song charted at number 13 on the UK Singles Chart. "Bounce" also received positive reviews from critics, who deemed it Azalea's most commercial song to date, "[Azalea] pairs the fiery raps for which she gained popularity with a club-friendly house beat that's the most commercial thing we've heard from her to date – more so even than the trappy 'Work.'"

In May 2013, in an interview with Rap-Up, after Azalea revealed she was no longer signed to Grand Hustle Records, she announced the album's third single would be titled "Change Your Life" and would feature T.I. She also revealed the melodic song finds her singing for the first time. "It's a big record," said Azalea of the single. "I think it will be good to have T.I. on that single and just show that we're together, we're still family. It's definitely not me trying to make my silent exit from Hustle Gang." "Change Your Life" premiered on BBC Radio 1Xtra on 19 August 2013. It was later released via digital distribution on 13 October. The song peaked at number 10 on the UK Singles Chart, becoming her highest-charting single on that chart at the time.

On 5 December 2013, an unfinished song by Azalea, which surfaced with the title "Leave It" and the tag "produced by DJ Mustard", was leaked online. Azalea later revealed the song was in fact produced by The Invisible Men & The Arcade, who she collaborated with on the entire album. On 5 February 2014, Azalea announced that she would be releasing a new single titled "Fancy", featuring English singer-songwriter Charli XCX, later that week. The song was premiered on BBC Radio 1 Xtra at 7 pm GMT on 6 February 2014. After the song's premiere, it was revealed "Fancy" was the song that had leaked titled "Leave It". On 17 February 2014, the song was serviced to urban contemporary radio in the United Kingdom as the album's fourth single and became her highest-charting song to date. Thanks to "Fancy" and "Problem", in which she is the featured artist, Azalea joined The Beatles as the only acts to rank at numbers one and two simultaneously with their first two Hot 100 hits. Moreover, Azalea passes Lil' Kim as the female rapper with the longest-leading No. 1 on the Billboard Hot 100 and moves into a tie for fifth place among lead women who have scored the longest commands on the Hot 100 this decade.

On 26 February 2014, in an interview with Los Angeles radio station Power 106, Azalea revealed that the next single from the album would be a song written by her and Katy Perry, featuring an undisclosed female artist, who was later revealed to be Rita Ora on "Black Widow", when the official track-listing was unveiled on 10 March 2014.

== Critical reception ==
Professional ratings
Aggregate scores
Source	Rating
Metacritic	56/100
Review scores
Source	Rating
AllMusic	3/5 stars
Cuepoint (Expert Witness)	A−
Entertainment Weekly	B−
The Guardian	3/5 stars
The Independent	4/5 stars
NME	2/5 stars
Q	2/5 stars
Rolling Stone	2.5/5 stars
Spin	4/10
USA Today	2/4 stars

The New Classic received generally mixed reviews from critics. At Metacritic, which assigns a normalized rating out of 100 to reviews from mainstream publications, the album received an average score of 56, based on 26 reviews. Simon Vozick-Levinson of Rolling Stone said Azalea gives the songs "the kind of shamelessly poppy hooks that make Top 40 programmers giggle in delight and 'real hip-hop' heads shake theirs sadly. If this is the future, it's one strange place." Tshepo Mokoena of The Guardian felt the album "barely resembles the west coast hip-hop Azalea idolised and imitated when developing her voice, and sits somewhere between EDM, dance-pop and trap music. Azalea can still spit out rapid-fire verses, but this album feels less forward-thinking than her 2011 Ignorant Art mixtape." Spin magazine's Alfred Soto said he hears "few indications in The New Classic of ambition existing apart from the itch for celebrity". Joe Sweeney from Slant Magazine said, "The New Classic mistakenly tries to frame Azalea as hip-hop's newest can't-miss egomaniac, focusing on the riches instead of the far more interesting rags"; the website later named The New Classic as one of the worst albums of 2014. Ray Rahman of Entertainment Weekly found its high-quality singles overshadowed by "undercooked, overstudied 'urban radio' and 'EDM' filler", while Q called Azalea a faux rebel who follows convention, despite an occasional catchy song.

In a positive review for Cuepoint, Robert Christgau argued that while Azalea may never demonstrate a powerful, soulful, or attractively melodic delivery, her "striving Australian-Atlantan cadence" is original and carries every song. He deemed The New Classic "plenty authentic – and damn good to boot" while dismissing Azalea's media naysayers: "predictably, the songs where she expresses wonderment that 'Impossible Is Nothing' are more relatable than the ones where she flaunts her liquid assets. But the ones where she pledges to keep on striving are more relatable than that, because striving is built into her flow itself. That's what her complexity is about." Phil Johnson from The Independent called it "an instantly engaging showcase of the 23-year-old Aussie's talents – poppy without diluting her fierce-flowing charisma." Kellan Miller of XXL said despite some poor songs near the end of the record, it is "a persuasive indicator that Iggy Azalea will be around for the long haul."

=== Accolades ===
The New Classic was named one of the best hip-hop albums of the year by XXL on a list published on 30 June 2014, adding that "the album proved to a gang of skepts who doubted Iggy's controversial style from the start that she was more than capable of making hip-hop tracks with a pop appeal." It was placed at number twenty-five on Digital Spy's top albums of 2014 and listed among Fuse's 40 best albums of 2014. The album won the Breakthrough Artist Release award at the 2014 ARIA Music Awards and Favorite Rap/Hip-Hop Album at the 2014 American Music Awards, beating out Drake's Nothing Was the Same and Eminem's The Marshall Mathers LP 2. It received a nomination for Best Rap Album at the 57th Grammy Awards. The album was also up for Top Rap Album at the 2015 Billboard Music Awards.

Year	Ceremony	Category	Result
2014	American Music Awards	Favorite Rap/Hip-Hop Album	Won
2014	ARIA Music Awards	Breakthrough Artist Release	Won
2014	ARIA Music Awards	Best Urban Album	Nominated
2015	Grammy Awards	Best Rap Album	Nominated
2015	Billboard Music Awards	Top Rap Album	Nominated

== Commercial performance ==
The album debuted at number 3 on the Billboard 200 chart, with first-week sales of 52,000 copies in the United States. The New Classic was the highest-charting female rap album, since Nicki Minaj's Pink Friday: Roman Reloaded (2012) and the highest chart entry for a female rapper's debut album since Nicki Minaj's Pink Friday (2010) entered at number 2. In its second week, the album sold 23,000 more copies. The album also moved up to number one on the Billboard Top R&B/Hip-Hop Albums and Top Rap Albums, making Azalea the first non-American female rapper to reach the summit of these charts. In its third week, it sold 15,000 more copies in the United States. In its fourth week, the album sold 16,000 more copies.

It re-entered the top forty on the Billboard 200 chart for the week ending 28 December 2014, selling 10,000 more copies and bringing its annual total to 485,000 in the United States. As of February 2015, it had crossed the 1.6 million track and streaming equivalent album sales mark in the US. As of April 2015, The New Classic has sold 500,000 copies in the United States. In April 2016, it was certified platinum by the Recording Industry Association of America.

On 26 August 2014, the album was certified gold in Canada. On 24 November 2014, it also received a Gold certification in Australia. The album was named the second most-streamed album of the year overall in the US, third in the UK and globally on commercial music streaming service Spotify in 2014. On 2 February 2015, it received a Platinum award from Universal Music Colombia. The New Classic also received a Platinum award from Universal Music Brazil, along with its repack Reclassified, on 8 November 2015.

== Track listing ==
No.	Title	Writer(s)	Producer(s)	Length
1.	"Walk the Line"	Amethyst Kelly; The Invisible Men; Jon Turner; Kurtis McKenzie	The Invisible Men; The Arcade	3:38
2.	"Don't Need Y'all"	Kelly; The Invisible Men; Turner; Jon Mills	The Invisible Men; The Arcade	3:33
3.	"100" (featuring Watch the Duck)	Kelly; Clifford "Tip" Harris; Oscar White; Jesse Rankins; Eddie Smith III; Johnathan Wells	Watch the Duck	4:09
4.	"Change Your Life" (featuring T.I.)	Kelly; Natalie Sims; Raja Kumari; The Messengers; Lovy Longomba; Harris	The Messengers	3:40
5.	"Fancy" (featuring Charli XCX)	Kelly; Charlotte Aitchison; The Invisible Men; Turner; McKenzie	The Invisible Men; The Arcade	3:19
6.	"New Bitch"	Kelly; The Invisible Men; Sims; Joey Dyer	The Invisible Men; Dyer	3:37
7.	"Work"	Kelly; The Invisible Men; Trocon Markous Roberts; Sims	The Invisible Men; FKi 1st	3:43
8.	"Impossible Is Nothing"	Kelly; The Invisible Men; Turner; Mills; Gabriel Yared	The Invisible Men; The Arcade	3:10
9.	"Goddess"	Kelly; The Invisible Men; Turner; Mills; Frank Farian	The Invisible Men; The Arcade	3:10
10.	"Black Widow" (featuring Rita Ora)	Kelly; Tor Erik Hermansen; Mikkel Storleer Eriksen; Benjamin Levin; Katy Perry; Sarah Hudson	Stargate	3:29
11.	"Lady Patra" (featuring Mavado)	Kelly; Mavado; Rock City; The Invisible Men; Turner; McKenzie; Daler Mehndi	The Invisible Men; The Arcade	3:56
12.	"Fuck Love"	Kelly; Rock City; The Invisible Men; Turner; Mills	The Invisible Men; The Arcade	2:39
Total length:				42:03

Deluxe edition (bonus tracks)
No.	Title	Writer(s)	Producer(s)	Length
13.	"Bounce"	Kelly; Reeva & Black; Speedy Jay; Talay Riley; Oladayo Olatunji; Sims	Reeva & Black	2:47
14.	"Rolex"	Kelly; The Invisible Men; Turner; McKenzie	The Invisible Men; The Arcade	3:23
15.	"Just Askin'"	Kelly; The Invisible Men; Roberts; Sims; Ryan Woodcock	The Invisible Men; WoodysProduce	2:58
Total length:				51:11

Signed Deluxe edition (digital bonus track)
No.	Title	Writer(s)	Producer(s)	Length
16.	"Fancy (Wiley Remix)" (featuring Charli XCX & Wiley)	Kelly; Charli XCX; The Invisible Men; Turner; McKenzie; Wiley	The Invisible Men; The Arcade	3:39
Total length:				54:50

Best Buy deluxe edition (bonus tracks)
No.	Title	Writer(s)	Producer(s)	Length
16.	"Fancy" (GTA Remix) (featuring Charli XCX))	Kelly; Charli XCX; The Invisible Men; Turner; McKenzie	The Invisible Men; The Arcade	4:12
17.	"Bounce" (Jester Remix)	Kelly; Reeva & Black; Speedy Jay; Riley; Olatunji; Sims	Reeva & Black	2:40

== Personnel ==
Credits adapted from Tidal.

Musicians

- Iggy Azalea – vocals
- The Invisible Men
  - George Astasio – keyboards (1, 5–8, 14), synthesizer programming (1, 2, 14, 15), drums (2, 9, 11, 12, 15), guitar (2, 9, 15), programming (5, 6, 9, 11, 12), bass (15)
  - Jason Pebworth – keyboards (1, 2, 5, 6, 8, 12), piano (5, 7, 14), programming (5, 6, 9)
  - Jon Shave – keyboards (1, 2, 6, 8, 12, 14), synthesizer programming (1, 14, 15), guitar (2), programming (5–7, 9, 11), drums (15)
- Kurtis McKenzie – keyboards (1, 5, 8, 14), synthesizer programming (1, 14), programming (5, 11), drums (11)
- Jon Mills – drums (2, 9, 11, 12), guitar (2, 9), programming (2, 12), keyboards (12)
- Watch the Duck – vocals (3)
- Raja Kumari – background vocals (4)
- Adam Messinger – programming (4)
- Lovy Longomba – programming (4)
- Clifford Harris – vocals (4)
- Sean Momberger – keyboards, programming (5)
- Charli XCX – vocals (5)
- Tiffani Juno – background vocals (6)
- Joey Dyer – keyboards (6), programming (6, 9)
- Stargate – synthesizer programming (10)
- Rita Ora – vocals (10)
- Mavado – vocals (11)
- Ms D – background vocals (13)
- Ryan Woodcock – bass, drums, guitar, synthesizer programming (15)

Technical

- Miles Showell – mastering engineer (1–3, 5–15)
- Stuart Hawkes – mastering engineer (4)
- Anthony Kilhoffer – mixer (1, 2, 5–9, 11–15)
- Andrew Wuepper – mixer (3)
- Jaycen Joshua – mixer (4)
- Phil Tan – mixer (10)
- Eric Weaver – engineer (1–3, 8, 9, 11, 12, 14)
- John Armstrong – engineer (5)
- Daniel Zaidenstadt – engineer (10)
- Fedda Weight – engineer (11)
- Elliot Carter – recording engineer (4)
- The Invisible Men – recording engineers (4, 5, 7, 13)
- Mark Hadfield – recording engineer (13)
- Mike Di Scala – recording engineer (13)
- Kyle Ross – assistant mixer (1, 2, 6, 8, 9, 11, 12, 14, 15)
- Josh Drucker – assistant mixer (3)
- Daniela Rivera – assistant mixer (10)
- Miles Walker – assistant mixer (10)
- Sarah Stennett – executive producer
- T.I. – executive producer

Design

- Iggy Azalea – creative director
- Brooke Nipar – cover photo
- Chris Berdine – packaging

== Charts ==
=== Weekly charts ===
Chart (2014)	Peak position
Australian Albums (ARIA)	2
Australian Urban Albums (ARIA)	1
Belgian Albums (Ultratop Flanders)	48
Belgian Albums (Ultratop Wallonia)	65
Canadian Albums (Billboard)	2
Danish Albums (Hitlisten)	29
Dutch Albums (Album Top 100)	58
Finnish Albums (Suomen virallinen lista)	24
French Albums (SNEP)	99
German Albums (Offizielle Top 100)	83
Irish Albums (IRMA)	13
New Zealand Albums (RMNZ)	3
Norwegian Albums (VG-lista)	6
Scottish Albums (Official Charts)	6
Swedish Albums (Sverigetopplistan)	12
UK Albums (Official Charts)	5
UK R&B Albums (Official Charts)	1
US Billboard 200	3
US Top R&B/Hip-Hop Albums (Billboard)	1

=== Year-end charts ===
Chart (2014)	Position
Australian Albums (ARIA)	43
Australian Urban Albums (ARIA)	6
Canadian Albums (Billboard)	35
Swedish Albums (Sverigetopplistan)	80
US Billboard 200	42
US Top R&B/Hip-Hop Albums (Billboard)	9
Chart (2015)	Position
US Top R&B/Hip-Hop Albums (Billboard)	54

=== Decade-end charts ===
Chart (2010–19)	Position
US Top R&B/Hip-Hop Albums (Billboard)	38

== Certifications ==
Region	Certification	Certified units/sales
Australia (ARIA)	Gold	35,000^{^}
Canada (Music Canada)	Gold	40,000^{^}
New Zealand (RMNZ)	Platinum	15,000^{‡}
United Kingdom (BPI)	Gold	100,000^{‡}
United States (RIAA)	2× Platinum	2,000,000^{‡}
^{^} Shipments figures based on certification alone.^{‡} Sales+streaming figures based on certification alone.

== Release history ==
Region	Date	Format(s)	Label	Ref.
United Kingdom	21 April 2014	CD; Digital download	Virgin EMI Records	
North America	22 April 2014	CD; Digital download	Def Jam	
Japan	23 April 2014	CD; Digital download	Universal Music	
Australia	25 April 2014	CD; Digital download	Universal Music	
New Zealand	25 April 2014	CD; Digital download	Universal Music	
Mexico	20 June 2014	CD; Digital download	Virgin EMI Records	

== See also ==
- List of 2014 albums
- List of UK R&B Albums Chart number ones of 2014
