= Impossible Is Nothing (Iggy Azalea song) =

Promotional single by Iggy Azalea

from the album The New Classic
- Released: 9 March 2014
- Recorded: 2013
- Studio: Grove Studios (London); Conway Studios (Los Angeles)
- Genre: Downtempo; hip hop
- Length: 3:10
- Label: Def Jam; Virgin EMI
- Songwriters: Iggy Azalea; The Invisible Men; Jon Turner; Jon Mills; Gabriel Yared
- Producers: The Invisible Men; The Arcade

"Impossible Is Nothing" is a song recorded by Australian rapper Iggy Azalea for her debut studio album, The New Classic (2014). It was written by Azalea, The Invisible Men, Jon Turner, and Jon Mills of The Arcade, and was produced by The Invisible Men and The Arcade. The song was recorded in 2013 at British Grove Studios in London, England and Conway Recording Studios in Los Angeles, California.

A downtempo, hip hop song, it features a tinkering beat which comprises percussion instrumentation such as chimes and a glockenspiel. Azalea raps the track's aspirational lyrics with a mantra technique, pertaining to themes of perseverance, empowerment and underdog triumphalism. The track also prominently features an interpolation of French-Lebanese composer Gabriel Yared's "Proust".

The song was released as a promotional single from the album on 9 March 2014, through Def Jam Recordings and Virgin EMI Records. It received mixed reviews from music critics who were divided on the sincerity and originality of the track's lyrical content. Upon release, the song debuted within the lower regions of the UK Singles Chart and the UK R&B Chart, hitting number 168 on the former and number 30 on the later. The song was later released as the eighth track to The New Classic on the 21st of April, 2014, alongside being released as a bonus track to the album's reissue, Reclassified.

== Background and release ==
"Impossible Is Nothing" was written by Iggy Azalea, The Invisible Men, Jon Turner, and Jon Mills of The Arcade for Azalea's debut studio album, The New Classic (2014). It contains an interpolation of "Proust" by French-Lebanese composer Gabriel Yared. The song was produced by The Invisible Men and The Arcade, while the "Proust" recreation was produced by Richard Adlam and Hol Ritson. Azalea recorded her vocals at Grove Studios in London, and Conway Studios in Los Angeles where the mixing process was completed by Anthony Kilhoffer—with the assistance of Kyle Ross—at The Mix Spot.

The song's title was first revealed by Azalea on 8 August 2013 on Instagram in an image of the album's tentative track listing. On 24 February 2014, Azalea announced the song as a promotional single that would serve as an "instant grat" digital download from the iTunes Store pre-order of The New Classic. The release was initially planned for 4 March 2014, but was slated to a date of 9 March 2014 instead. In Canada, the song was released separately from the pre-order on 21 April 2014.

== Composition ==
"Impossible Is Nothing"
A 19-second sample of "Impossible Is Nothing" in which prominent siren sound effects and percussion instruments are featured as Azalea performs the refrain with a mantra technique.

"Impossible Is Nothing" is a semi-subdued, downtempo, hip hop song. Caitlyn Carter of the Music Times writes that the track has a "haunting-yet-upbeat" sound. According to John Walker of MTV News, the song takes on a more "vulnerable" sound than Azalea's previous material. The track's instrumentation includes keyboards, drums, an electric guitar line backing, and synthesizers. It features a tinkering beat produced by tuned percussion instruments including chimes and a glockenspiel which causes eerie loop sound effects in the song. A string of siren sound effects are also heard throughout. Azalea's delivery is rapped with a mantra technique.

With aspirational lyrics, "Impossible Is Nothing" contains themes of perseverance, empowerment and "underdog triumphalism". It also showcases ideas of prosocial behavior and "blonde ambition". The lyrics welcome newcomers in the music industry, "I even hope at one point you take it farther than me", and speak of self-empowerment: "I shall never let 'em see me sweat / Promise to want for more until my very last breath / Promise to blaze a path and leave a trail for the next / And never sell out my soul for any number on a check". According to Lucy O'Brien of The Quietus, the lyrics portray Azalea as "the hardworking Aussie girl and the feminist goddess urging with messianic fervour". John Lucas of The Georgia Straight describes the song as a "bite-sized motivational seminar". "Impossible Is Nothing" was compared to songs by Eminem, specifically from his 2010 album Recovery.

== Critical reception ==
Predictably, the songs where she expresses wonderment that 'Impossible Is Nothing' are more relatable than the ones where she flaunts her liquid assets. But the ones where she pledges to keep on striving are more relatable than that, because striving is built into her flow itself. That's what her complexity is about.

— Robert Christgau, Billboard

"Impossible Is Nothing" received mixed reviews from music critics. In a positive review, Saeed Saeed of The National wrote that it was among two tracks on The New Classic "that stand out, out of pure will", and complimented its "moody" sound. Eric Diep of XXL also deemed it a highlight on the album, and commended its "heartfelt story". A writer for Rap-Up described the track as an "empowering anthem". Maria Therese Seefeldt Stæhr of Gaffa praised the track's production. Stereogum's Chris DeVille called it "the best Eminem song in years". Josiah Hughes of Exclaim! wrote positively of the song's "banging beat" and inspirational lyrics. A writer for Oyster praised the sincerity of the lyrics and the "power of its uplifting and never-quitting #feels". Digital Spy's Emily Mackay noted "a ballsy power to [Azalea's] self-made self-belief" in the song. While Nick Aveling of Time Out felt the track played to Azalea's "substantive strengths". Charlotte Richardson Andrews of NME opined that it showcased Azalea's "wit, personality and lyrical prowess". Similarly, The Line of Best Fit's Laurence Day felt the track manifested the rapper as "an affable bundle of chum-ly charm with lessons (not patronising lectures) that are applicable for anyone with a lick of ambition". Craig Mathieson of The Sydney Morning Herald praised the song's "unexpected complement" of inspirational lyrics with spectral melodies.

Other reviewers were critical of the track's lyrics; Alfred Soto of Spin said it "lays out every admonitory cliché from the Barnes & Noble self-help shelf"—a view echoed by Lindsay Zoladz of New York who dismissed it as "inspirational quotes copied from a high-school guidance counselor's bulletin board". Karen Lawler of Blues & Soul wrote: "While, [the track is] is bound to be a favourite among Iggy fans, it's a subject that's been done millions of time before and it's been done better". Nolan Feeney of Time commented on its originality in a comparison with the 2012 track "Ten Thousand Hours" by Macklemore & Ryan Lewis: "The platitudes of 'Impossible Is Nothing' await whoever didn't finish putting in their 10,000 hours on Macklemore's own you-can-do-it-too anthem".

"Impossible Is Nothing" was named as one of the two worst songs on The New Classic by Devone Jones of PopMatters who criticized Azalea for "literally preaching—to youths, rather than [relating] to them". AbsolutePunk's Jake Jenkins called it "a muddled mess of a narrative", and added, "[The track] does nothing to give us a clear picture, or any picture at all really, of what [Azalea's] been through". Jon Caramanica of The New York Times said that the song was "sort of blandly inspirational" and "as numbing" as material by T.I. While Troy L. Smith of The Plain Dealer felt Azalea "[showed] promise" with the song; he dismissed the production as "leftovers from one of Eminem's recent albums".

== Credits and personnel ==
- Iggy Azalea – writer, vocals
- The Invisible Men – writers, producers, drums and programming, keyboards
- Jon Turner – writer
- The Arcade – writers, producers
- Gabriel Yared – writer
- Richard Adlam – sample recreation, keyboards, tuned percussion
- Hol Ritson – sample recreation, keyboards, tuned percussion
- Eric Weaver – vocal engineering
- Anthony Kilhoffer – mixing
- Kyle Ross – mixing assistant

Credits adapted from the album's liner notes.

== Charts ==
Chart (2014)	Peak position
UK Singles (Official Charts)	168
UK Hip Hop/R&B (Official Charts)	30
