= TrapGold =

Mixtape by Iggy Azalea
- Released: 11 October 2012
- Genres: Trap; alternative hip hop; electronic
- Length: 30:31
- Label: Self-released
- Producers: 1st Down of FKi; Diplo; Bro Safari; Sleigh Bells; Flosstradamus; Tiesto; Dj Spinz

Iggy Azalea chronology
Glory (2012)	TrapGold (2012)	The New Classic (2014)

TrapGold is the second and final mixtape by Australian rapper Iggy Azalea, who released it as a free digital download on 11 October 2012. American DJ and music producer Diplo and 1st Down of FKi executive produced the project, along with Azalea and Stix serving as co-executive producers. It also features a guest appearance from Juicy J and samples interviews from Salvador Dalí, Andy Warhol, David LaChapelle and Reiner Opoku.

== Background and development ==
In August 2012, while giving interviews to different media outlets to promote the release of her free-digital download EP Glory, through T.I.'s Grand Hustle Records, Azalea revealed her plans of a new trap-electronic project entitled TrapGold with Diplo. She said: "It's going to be very experimental and I want to get some shit from Diplo for that project. I have a date for TrapGold, but I don’t want to tell anyone yet. I want to put it up on twitter one day and surprise everyone." While feeling pressured to make the music people expected of her at that point of her career, Azalea got the chance to make the music she truly wanted with the project, "it's not going to sound like any other shit." "Hopefully my album The New Classic will be a mix of everything. I am really young - just turned 22, and I have not been making music for that long. [...] I have a sound in my head and I don’t know how to get that yet. That is going to take practice and trial and error," she added, "I like to share my trials and errors with the rest of the world because sometimes the world loves your errors. Some songs you like and some you don't. I will keep sharing the journey with everyone because you can’t have perfection in art."

Azalea praised Diplo while talking about the mixtape that would have "trap breakdowns, it's crazy [...] it'll have less storytelling [...] It'll be more fun... shit you can dance to. You could listen to this mixtape as an instrumental the whole way through. I could put TrapGold out now with no words and it would kill half the shit out there because Diplo is a genius. That's, no testament to me, I can say that Diplo is the man." After the release, she reflected, "I was so mad and frustrated and angry, that's why it's so aggressive. I felt mad at people who'd fucked me over, I was mad about people shitting on me for being on the XXL cover, I'd broken up in my relationship. After I did TrapGold I felt like I'd let it all out. My album will definitely be like that, because I liked the way that made me feel," and explained why she gravitated towards Southern rap, "The South doesn't give a fuck and they have more fun," elaborating on her own style, "When you rap fast it almost seems like another language. People can't understand all of what you're saying, and it's cool to me not because you can have bad lyrics but because it becomes about the way you say it and the energy of it all."

TrapGold features a guest appearance from American rapper Juicy J on the track "Flexin' & Finessin'" and samples interviews from artists Salvador Dalí, Andy Warhol, David LaChapelle and international curator Reiner Opoku, on the tracks "Intro," "Slo.," "Quicktime" and "Outro," respectively. MTV wrote: "TrapGold also showcases a lot of what makes Iggy so distinct as an artist. In between the shit-talking and gleeful bragging, she sprinkles snippets of interviews with Dalí, Warhol and LaChapelle; as the title of her first mixtape indicated, Iggy is all about combining ignorance and art in a fresh way." Azalea also designed the cover art herself.

== Release and promotion ==
On 28 September 2012, Azalea announced she would be releasing a new mixtape TrapGold, produced entirely by Diplo and FKi, on 11 October, and also premiered visuals for the track "Bac 2 Tha Future (My Time)," directed by Bell Soto. Soto said the video was "more of a raw street/psychedelic sexy trip," adding that, "Iggy had a vision of the direction for her song, which is very raw, keeping elements of street and palm trees in LA. And also the butterflies. [...] Iggy is a great art director too, but we exchange ideas in a very organic way." The mixtape's track listing and cover artwork were released on 30 September 2012, receiving the stamp of approval from fellow Australian recording artist Kylie Minogue. On 5 October 2012, Azalea premiered an audio clip for the track "Down South."

TrapGold was released on 11 October 2012. She dedicated the mixtape to her "loyal fans", whom she calls Azaleans, saying: "TrapGold is a project I created, to bring me back the feeling I used to get before I meet those men in suits who tried to find every way to suck the life and magic out of me." She explained, "It's the fun and cockiness of being young and feeling bulletproof. It's winding down your car window, extending your middle finger out and up into the sun as those men behind their desks stare down at you from their high-rise offices... 'FU*K EM!'"

In late November and early December 2012, Azalea headlined a tour in Europe to support TrapGold, consisting of eight shows in eight cities in France, United Kingdom, Ireland, Spain, Germany, Netherlands, Belgium and Germany. FKi served as Azalea's DJ for the tour.

The mixtape continued being offered as a free download on Azalea's official website throughout 2013, after the release of her first official single, "Work," from her debut album. On 3 April 2013, Hunger TV released a monochromatic portrait-heavy music video for the track "Slo," directed by Rankin, conveniently delivered to coincide with the new issue of his Hunger Magazine, that featured Azalea on the cover.

== Critical reception ==
The mixtape received generally positive reviews from music critics. Calvin Stovall of BET gave TrapGold four out of five stars, stating that Azalea "shows vast improvement on her latest effort" and it "is one of the better mixtapes released this year," concluding, "Still, though we may never get used to the sight or sound of a blonde Australian rhyming over trap beats, she has just enough bounce to make us want to hear some more." Vice's Noisey commented "people should stop giving Iggy Azalea shit, because she rules." Nick Guarino of TSIS.com said "this is definitely the real start of something strong for Iggy. A great listen for hip-hop and electronic fans."

Rose Lilah of HNHH called it "a fine addition to the growing body of work Iggy Azalea has been developing since stepping foot (sic) in the game." Sam Lansky of Idolator also noted "the beats are predictably sick, making it another worthy entry from the willowy rapstress." MTV Base wrote that the mixtape "combines booming, clattering trap production with Iggy sounding more aggressive and confident than ever." On DatPiff, TrapGold holds four out of five stars, and has been downloaded over 44,000 times earning a Bronze certification status, despite not having originally premiered on the online mixtape distribution platform.

== Track listing ==
No.	Title	Producer(s)	Length
1.	"Intro (Dali)"		0:48
2.	"Yo El Ray"	Diplo; Bro Safari; FKi	2:47
3.	"Down South"	Diplo; FKi	4:16
4.	"Demons"	Sleigh Bells; Diplo	3:26
5.	"Slo."	Diplo; FKi	3:46
6.	"Quicktime"	FKi	3:39
7.	"Flexin' & Finessin'" (featuring Juicy J)	FKi; Flosstradamus	3:26
8.	"1 800 BONE"	FKi; Diplo	3:09
9.	"Bac 2 Tha Future (My Time)"	FKi; Tiësto	1:59
10.	"Golddust"	DJ Spinz; FKi	2:58
11.	"Outro (David LaChapelle)"		0:12
Total length:			30:31

Sample credits

Information adapted from WhoSampled.

- "Demons" contains a sample of "Demons" performed by Sleigh Bells.
- "Slo." contains a sample of "Tuvan" performed by Gaia.
- "Bac 2 Tha Future (My Time)" contains a sample of "We Own The Night" performed by Tiësto and Wolfgang Gartner featuring Luciana.
- "Golddust" contains a sample of Flux Pavilion's remix of "Gold Dust" performed by DJ Fresh.
