= Glory (EP) =

EP by Iggy Azalea
- Released: 30 July 2012
- Recorded: 2012 (Tree Sound Studios)
- Genres: Alternative hip hop; electronic
- Length: 23:05
- Label: Grand Hustle Records
- Producers: Bei Maejor; Lil' C; Mike Posner; Omega; B.o.B

Iggy Azalea chronology
Ignorant Art (2011)	Glory (2012)	TrapGold (2012)

Glory is the debut extended play (EP) by Australian rapper Iggy Azalea, released as a free digital download on 30 July 2012, by Grand Hustle Records. The EP serves as her first project with T.I.'s label since the announcement of her signing back in March 2012. The EP features guest appearances from T.I., who also serves as the project's executive producer, along with fellow rappers B.o.B and Pusha T, as well as singer-songwriter Mike Posner. The EP was recorded in 2012 at Tree Sound Studios, and its production was handled by Posner and B.o.B, alongside Bei Maejor, Lil' C and Omega.

Upon its release, the free-download EP was met with a mixed review from XXL. Despite this, the EP, after premiering exclusively on online mixtape distribution platform DatPiff, has since then been downloaded over 100,000 times on the website. It was also featured on their annual Top Mixtapes list of 2012.

== Background and concept ==
Azalea's career took off in mid-2011, after several videos from her official YouTube account went viral, most notably her controversial music videos for her songs "Pu$$y" and "Two Times," the latter being a cover version of Gucci Mane's "Gucci Two Times." After releasing her first full-length project, a mixtape titled Ignorant Art in September 2011, Azalea aligned herself with Atlanta-based rapper T.I., eventually signing a recording contract with his record label Grand Hustle. With plans to release her debut studio album under the label, she put those plans on hold and on 22 April 2012, announced she would be releasing an EP titled Glory.

In an exclusive interview with AllHipHop, Azalea revealed the tracks on the EP were originally slated for her debut album The New Classic, and were recorded while she was in Atlanta and spending time with other artists on Grand Hustle: "Everything that got recorded for Glory, for the most part, was intended for my album and I was doing this record while I was in Atlanta with everybody from Grand Hustle like Trae [the Truth] and all these other artists, and I was just around stuff that was so 'rap'." Her intent for the content on Glory was to satiate fans of more hard-rap records: "I like that 'rap' stuff as well, and I thought, 'I want to make some songs like this and put them on my album,' and other people weren't really into that idea. So I thought I could put them out on Glory, because I still want to be able to give this to the world for everyone to be able to know that I can do these type of records." She added that the EP was just a teaser for her upcoming debut full-length release, "I just want to take baby steps. It's a way for me to test the waters and see what people want to hear from me, so I don't give you an album you hate."

While explaining the concept behind the project's title, Azalea stated, "I was in this weird place where it felt like everyone was shitting on me, like, "She didn't get that deal with Interscope. She got dropped! She won't get another project!" making it so much worse than any of it really was. I felt like they wanted me to fail and I thought, I'm not going to go anywhere. I'm going to get my glory. I'm going to get my shine. [...] It's to prove to myself that I can write songs. It's not easy to make a song that the whole world relates to, and to do it over and over again. When I got in the studio I realized this is really, really hard. It's easy to do whatever the hell you want to do but everybody can't connect to that. I was just trying to find a different way that I could do it with Glory. I don't know if it's successful but I did learn a lot about songwriting while I was doing it." She clarified in another interview her desire to try to "make more traditional-sounding records. [...] I am a songwriter and I wanted to be able to try and write songs that were more traditional and structured," as she felt it was challenging for her and harder than just to do whatever she felt like, "I wanted to try and make an EP where I had other people sing hooks, because I can’t sing. I wanted to see if I can make these kinds of records well."

She also defended her decision of wanting to release the project for free: "I just think that when you're doing albums and stuff like that, you have to be more considerate of the other people that you're working with or your label or A&R, and you have to appease these other people and for something like Glory. When it's free, I get a pass to do whatever I like, and this is what I wanted to do, because of who I was around."

== Release and promotion ==
Azalea announced the project in late April via her Twitter feed, when she tweeted: "May = glory. The EP. #GLORY. I'm just onto something right now, the last two weeks and it's glory. Azaleans need something new." Azalea unveiled the EP's cover art on 27 June 2012, a few days after she premiered her collaboration with label-mates B.o.B and T.I., "Million Dollar Misfits."

The project's lead single "Murda Bizness", was released 26 March 2012, and premiered by Azalea via her official YouTube account. The single was originally meant to be the lead single for her debut album The New Classic, but due to the delay, it was included on the EP. The song was produced by Bei Maejor and features T.I. rapping a verse. The second promotional song from the EP, titled "Flash", featuring vocals and production from Mike Posner and Omega, premiered on 23 July 2012. The project was finally released online as a free digital download on 30 July 2012.

The "Murda Bizness" music video, directed by Alex/2Tone, was released on 21 July 2012. The video was inspired by American reality television series Toddlers & Tiaras. Azalea took full responsibility for the creative direction of the video and revealed T.I. admitted hating it when she first told him about the concept. She talked about the parody concept stating, "Watching it [Toddlers & Tiaras], I thought, Here are these moms and toddlers just taking this so seriously, this is the fiercest of competitions I've seen in awhile. They're so flashy and they want crowns, rhinestones, diamonds, and bright outfits. The flashiness and competitiveness reminds me of rap. A lot of people heard "Murda Bizness" and thought it was about killing people, trying to be tough and hardcore. If you actually listen to the lyrics, it's kind of silly and playful. It's about being in the club, being a bad bitch." The director said, "I think that people are drawing parallels between the title of the song and the business the girls are in. I don’t know that it was something that we lined up on purpose, but you take it how you want to take it."

== Critical reception ==
Professional ratings
Review scores
Source	Rating
XXL	(L)

Glory received a mixed to positive review from XXL. XXL's Adam Fleischer claimed: "she's still growing into herself as an artist, something she continues to do with her new Glory EP." Fleischer also wrote the best tracks on the EP are those with features: "Iggy is still navigating her way to be comfortable enough on a track to fully make it her own, which is why the strongest cuts on the six-track project find her bringing along a partner in rhyme to add a twist. Things kick off with the B.o.B & T.I.-assisted 'Millionaire Misfits,' where an electronic/dance backdrop guide a slew of boasts, like getting '100 racks for a show.' After her single 'Murda Bizness,' with T.I., the 2012 XXL Freshman teams with Pusha T and slows things down on 'Runaway.'" Fleischer concluded with: "There's a reason that T.I. brought Iggy Azalea to Grand Hustle, and it's not just her long legs and blonde hair (though those attributes certainly don't hurt her marketability). The up and comer has a personal history and set of experiences not typically told in hip-hop, and potential as an MC if she continues to hone her skills and learn from those around her. With the Glory EP, she heads in that direction." HNHH called it "a worthy addition to a respectable catalogue that has seen a lot of growth since Iggy Azalea debuted in this game," adding that she accomplishes all the things a new artist needs to: "her ability to flow alongside feature artists, hold a song down solo, construct a concept, and pick a beat," concluding, "For now our ears are satisfied, and our playlists graced with a tight sextuplet." On DatPiff, Glory holds a four out of five stars and was featured on their annual Top Mixtapes list of 2012.

== Track listing ==
No.	Title	Writer(s)	Producer(s)	Length
1.	"Millionaire Misfits" (featuring B.o.B & T.I.)	Amethyst Kelly; Bobby Simmons, Jr.; Clifford Harris, Jr.; Brandon Green	Bei Maejor	3:41
2.	"Murda Bizness" (featuring T.I.)	Kelly; Glenda "Gizzle" Proby; Harris, Jr.; Green; Rock City	Bei Maejor	3:31
3.	"Runway" (featuring Pusha T and Naz Tokio)	Kelly; Terrence Thornton; Simmons, Jr.	B.o.B	3:40
4.	"Me, Myself, My Money"	Kelly; Proby; Cordale Quinn	Lil' C	3:51
5.	"Flash" (featuring Mike Posner)	Kelly; Proby; Michael Posner	Michael "Omega" Fonseca; Mike Posner	4:17
6.	"Glory"	Kelly; Proby		4:05
Total length:				23:05

== Personnel ==
- Clifford "T.I." Harris, Jr. – executive producer, composer, featured artist
- Elliot Carter – engineer
- Kozyndan – art direction, graphic design, photography
- Glenda "Gizzle" Proby – composer
- Pusha T – composer, featured artist
- B.o.B – composer, producer, featured artist
- Lil' C – composer, producer
- Bei Maejor – composer, producer
- Naz Tokio – additional vocals (track 3)
- John Sabbas – additional instrumentation
