= Billboard Year-End Hot R&B/Hip-Hop Songs of 2014 =

This is a list of Billboard magazine's Top Hot R&B/Hip-Hop Songs of 2014.

No.	Title	Artist(s)
1	"Happy"	Pharrell Williams
2	"All of Me"	John Legend
3	"Fancy"	Iggy Azalea featuring Charli XCX
4	"Talk Dirty"	Jason Derulo featuring 2 Chainz
5	"The Monster"	Eminem featuring Rihanna
6	"Black Widow"	Iggy Azalea featuring Rita Ora
7	"Drunk in Love"	Beyoncé featuring Jay-Z
8	"Wiggle"	Jason Derulo featuring Snoop Dogg
9	"Anaconda"	Nicki Minaj
10	"Loyal"	Chris Brown featuring Lil Wayne and Too Short or French Montana or Tyga
11	"Don't Tell 'Em"	Jeremih featuring YG
12	"Show Me"	Kid Ink featuring Chris Brown
13	"The Man"	Aloe Blacc
14	"Hot Nigga"	Bobby Shmurda
15	"2 On"	Tinashe featuring Schoolboy Q
16	"Na Na"	Trey Songz
17	"My Nigga"	YG featuring Jeezy and Rich Homie Quan
18	"Hold On, We're Going Home"	Drake featuring Majid Jordan
19	"Lifestyle"	Rich Gang featuring Young Thug and Rich Homie Quan
20	"New Flame"	Chris Brown featuring Usher and Rick Ross
21	"Partition"	Beyoncé
22	"Love Never Felt So Good"	Michael Jackson and Justin Timberlake
23	"No Mediocre"	T.I. featuring Iggy Azalea
24	"Studio"	Schoolboy Q featuring BJ the Chicago Kid
25	"23"	Mike Will Made It featuring Miley Cyrus, Wiz Khalifa and Juicy J
26	"White Walls"	Macklemore & Ryan Lewis featuring Schoolboy Q and Hollis
27	"Believe Me"	Lil Wayne featuring Drake
28	"Paranoid"	Ty Dolla $ign featuring B.o.B
29	"0 to 100 / The Catch Up"	Drake
30	"Pills n Potions"	Nicki Minaj
31	"The Worst"	Jhené Aiko
32	"We Dem Boyz"	Wiz Khalifa
33	"Or Nah"	Ty Dolla $ign featuring Wiz Khalifa and DJ Mustard
34	"Rap God"	Eminem
35	"No Flex Zone"	Rae Sremmurd
36	"Blurred Lines"	Robin Thicke featuring T.I. and Pharrell
37	"Trophies"	Young Money featuring Drake
38	"Who Do You Love?"	YG featuring Drake
39	"All Me"	Drake featuring 2 Chainz and Big Sean
40	"About the Money"	T.I. featuring Young Thug
41	"It Won't Stop"	Sevyn Streeter
42	"Move That Dope"	Future featuring Pharrell Williams, Pusha T and Casino
43	"Main Chick"	Kid Ink featuring Chris Brown
44	"Cut Her Off"	K Camp featuring 2 Chainz
45	"Work"	Iggy Azalea
46	"Up Down (Do This All Day)"	T-Pain featuring B.o.B
47	"Come Get It Bae"	Pharrell Williams
48	"Stoner"	Young Thug
49	"Good Kisser"	Usher
50	"V. 3005"	Childish Gambino
51	"Touchin, Lovin"	Trey Songz featuring Nicki Minaj
52	"I Don't Fuck with You"	Big Sean featuring E-40
53	"No Type"	Rae Sremmurd
54	"Tuesday"	ILoveMakonnen featuring Drake
55	"Man of the Year"	Schoolboy Q
56	"Hold You Down"	DJ Khaled featuring Chris Brown, August Alsina, Future and Jeremih
57	"Love More"	Chris Brown featuring Nicki Minaj
58	"Holy Grail"	Jay-Z featuring Justin Timberlake
59	"Fight Night"	Migos
60	"XO"	Beyoncé
61	"The Language"	Drake
62	"Ride"	SoMo
63	"Part II (On the Run)"	Jay-Z featuring Beyoncé
64	"Gas Pedal"	Sage the Gemini featuring Iamsu!
65	"I"	Kendrick Lamar
66	"Hookah"	Tyga featuring Young Thug
67	"Headlights"	Eminem featuring Nate Ruess
68	"Foreign"	Trey Songz
69	"Flawless"	Beyoncé
70	"She Twerkin"	Cash Out
71	"Bound 2"	Kanye West
72	"24 Hours"	TeeFlii featuring 2 Chainz
73	"They Don't Know"	Rico Love
74	"TKO"	Justin Timberlake
75	"Handsome and Wealthy"	Migos
76	"I Won"	Future featuring Kanye West
77	"Walk Thru"	Rich Homie Quan featuring Problem
78	"You & I (Nobody in the World)"	John Legend
79	"I Luv This Shit"	August Alsina featuring Trinidad James
80	"You and Your Friends"	Wiz Khalifa featuring Snoop Dogg and Ty Dolla Sign
81	"Can't Raise a Man"	K. Michelle
82	"Berzerk"	Eminem
83	"2AM."	Adrian Marcel featuring Sage the Gemini
84	"Survival"	Eminem
85	"Confident"	Justin Bieber featuring Chance the Rapper
86	"Feelin' Myself"	will.i.am featuring Miley Cyrus, French Montana, Wiz Khalifa and DJ Mustard
87	"Seen It All"	Jeezy featuring Jay-Z
88	"I Mean It"	G-Eazy featuring Remo
89	"Money Baby"	K Camp featuring Kwony Cash
90	"Yayo"	Snootie Wild featuring Yo Gotti
91	"No Love"	August Alsina
92	"Worst Behavior"	Drake
93	"Tom Ford"	Jay-Z
94	"I Know"	Yo Gotti featuring Rich Homie Quan
95	"Headband"	B.o.B featuring 2 Chainz
96	"Guts Over Fear"	Eminem featuring Sia
97	"Often"	The Weeknd
98	"She Knows"	J. Cole featuring Amber Coffman and Cults
99	"John Doe"	B.o.B featuring Priscilla
100	"Red Nose"	Sage the Gemini

== See also ==
- 2014 in music
- Billboard Year-End Hot 100 singles of 2014
- Billboard Year-End Hot Rap Songs of 2014
- List of number-one R&B/hip-hop songs of 2014 (U.S.)
