= Billboard Year-End Hot 100 singles of 2014 =

Ranking of recorded music

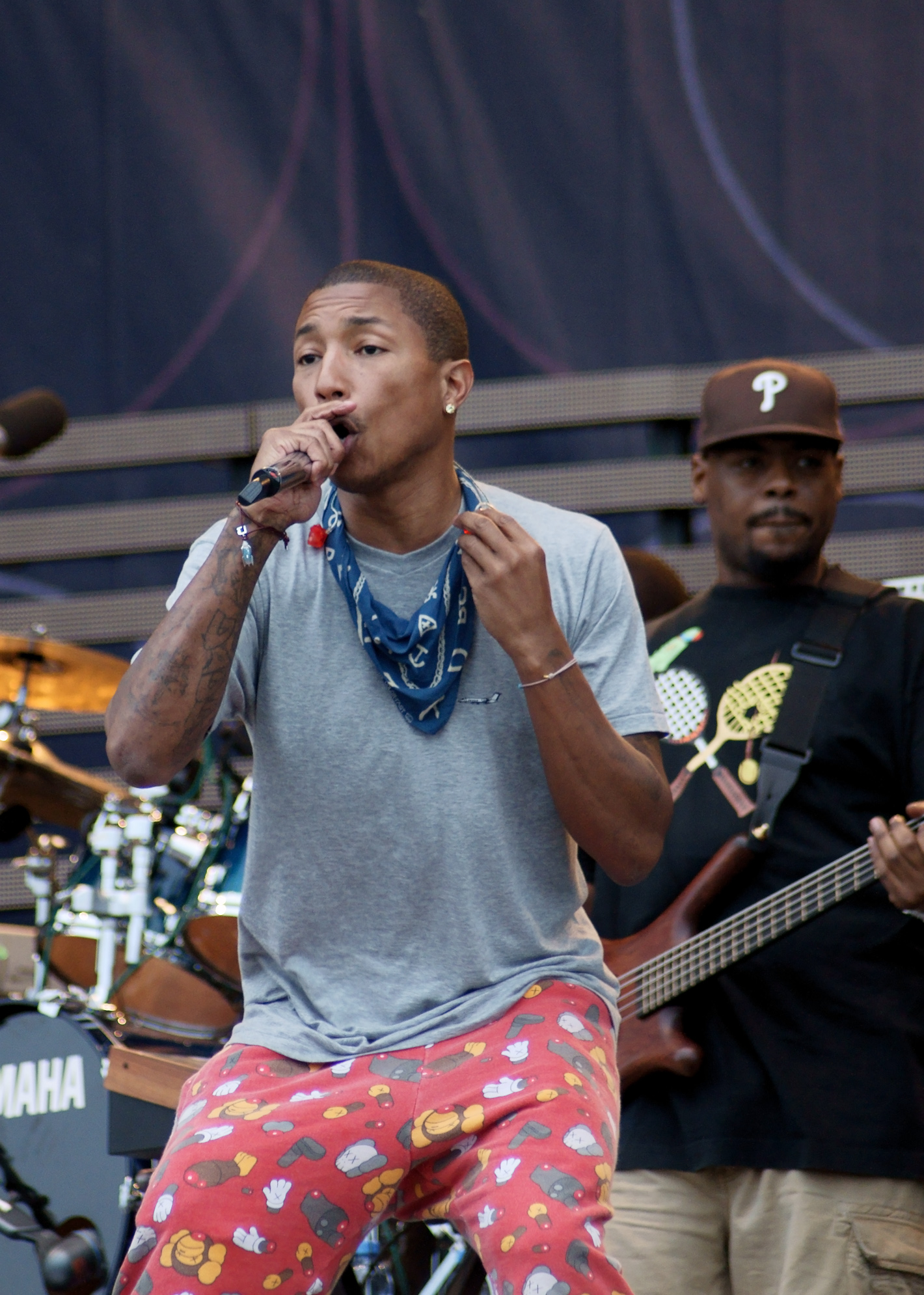
"Happy" by Pharrell Williams came in at number one, spending a total of ten consecutive weeks at the top position of the Billboard Hot 100 throughout 2014.

The Billboard Hot 100 is a chart that ranks the best-performing singles of the United States. Its data, published by Billboard magazine and compiled by Nielsen SoundScan, is based collectively on each single's weekly physical and digital sales, as well as airplay and streaming. Throughout a year, Billboard will publish an annual list of the 100 most successful songs throughout that year on the Hot 100 chart based on the information. For 2014, the list was published on December 9, calculated with data from December 7, 2013 to November 29, 2014.

Katy Perry was the top Hot 100 artist of 2014, with "Dark Horse", ranked as the number-two song of the year and featuring Juicy J, the highest of her three placements on the list.

This was the first time in eight years that a male artist topped the chart with a non-collaboration.

== List ==
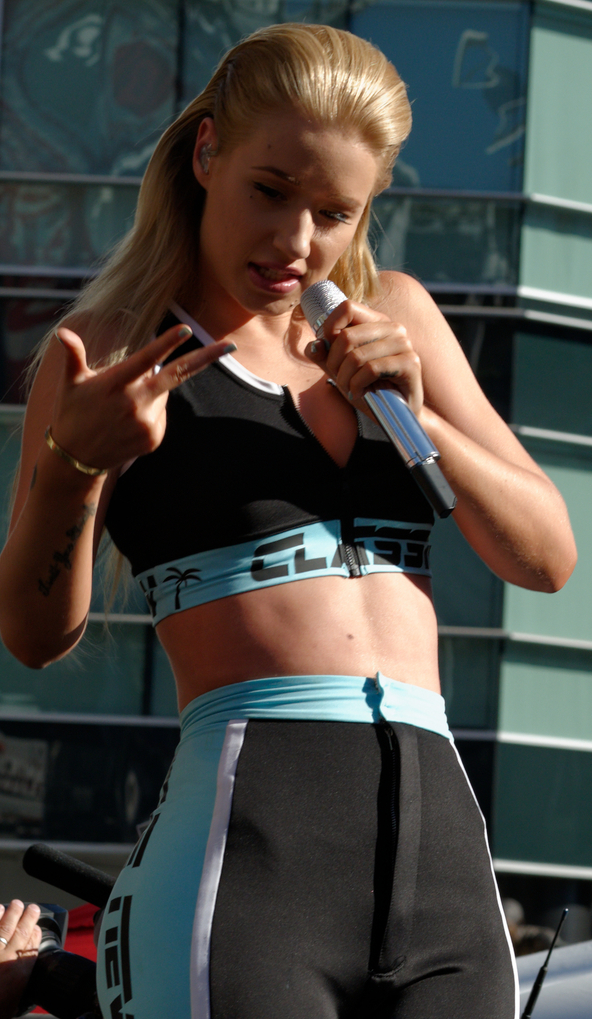
Australian rapper Iggy Azalea has four songs, the most of all artists, on the list. Her highest-charting was "Fancy" (number 4).

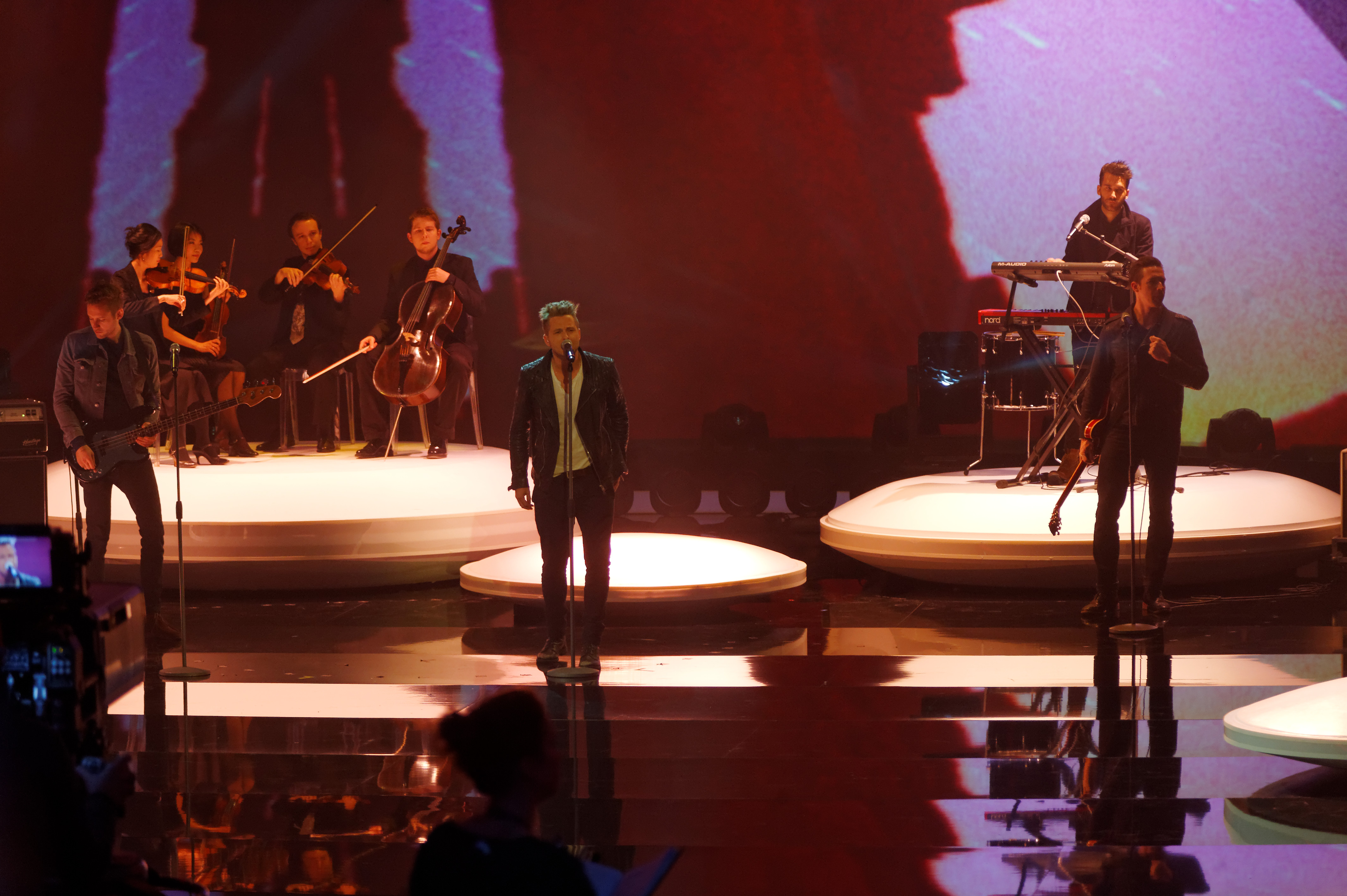
OneRepublic is the highest-charting band on the list with their single "Counting Stars" (number 5). They also had their single, "Love Runs Out" at number 67.

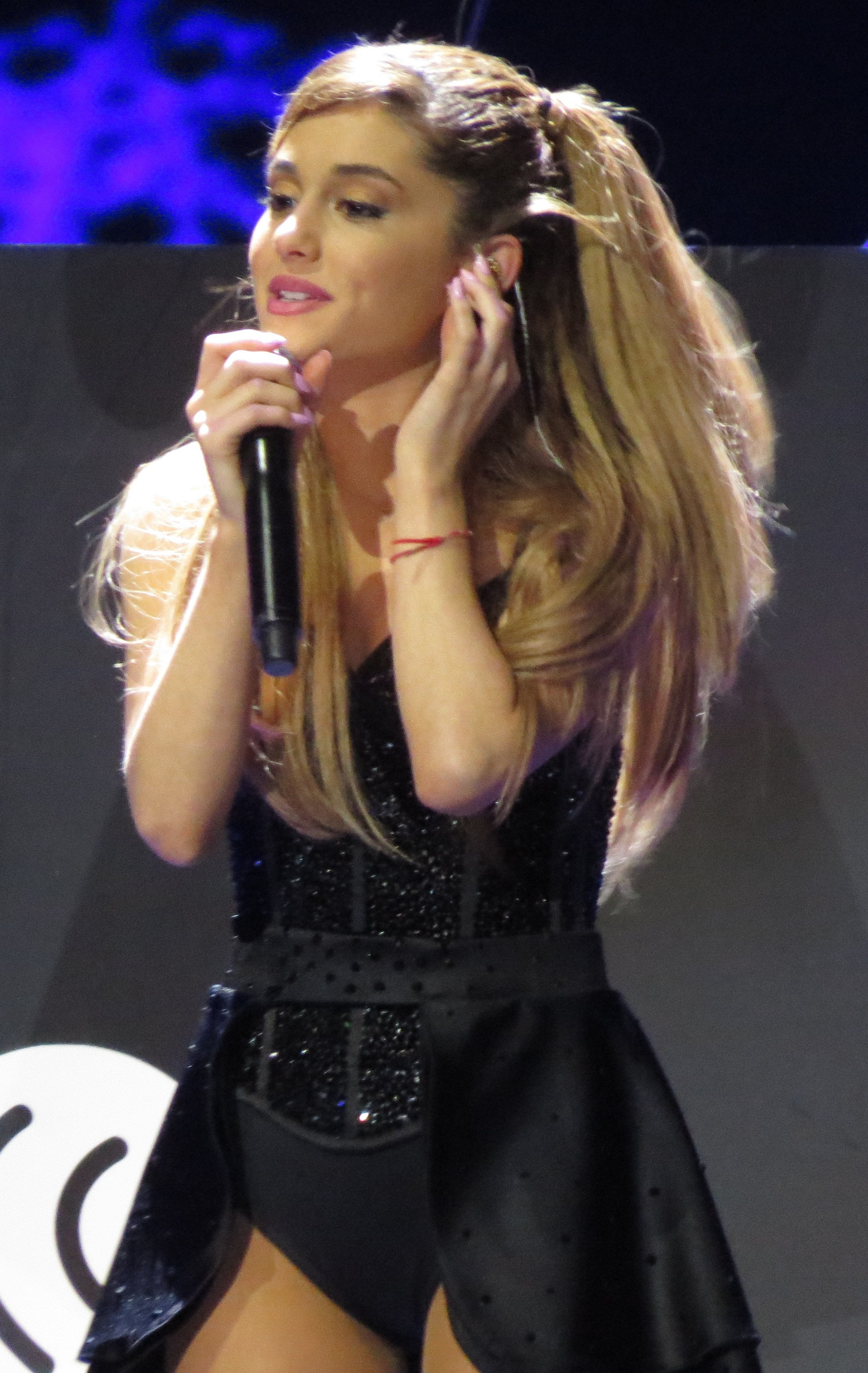
Ariana Grande has three singles in the top 40, with "Problem" featuring Iggy Azalea (number 9), "Bang Bang", her collaboration with Jessie J and Nicki Minaj (number 27), and "Break Free" featuring Zedd (number 37).

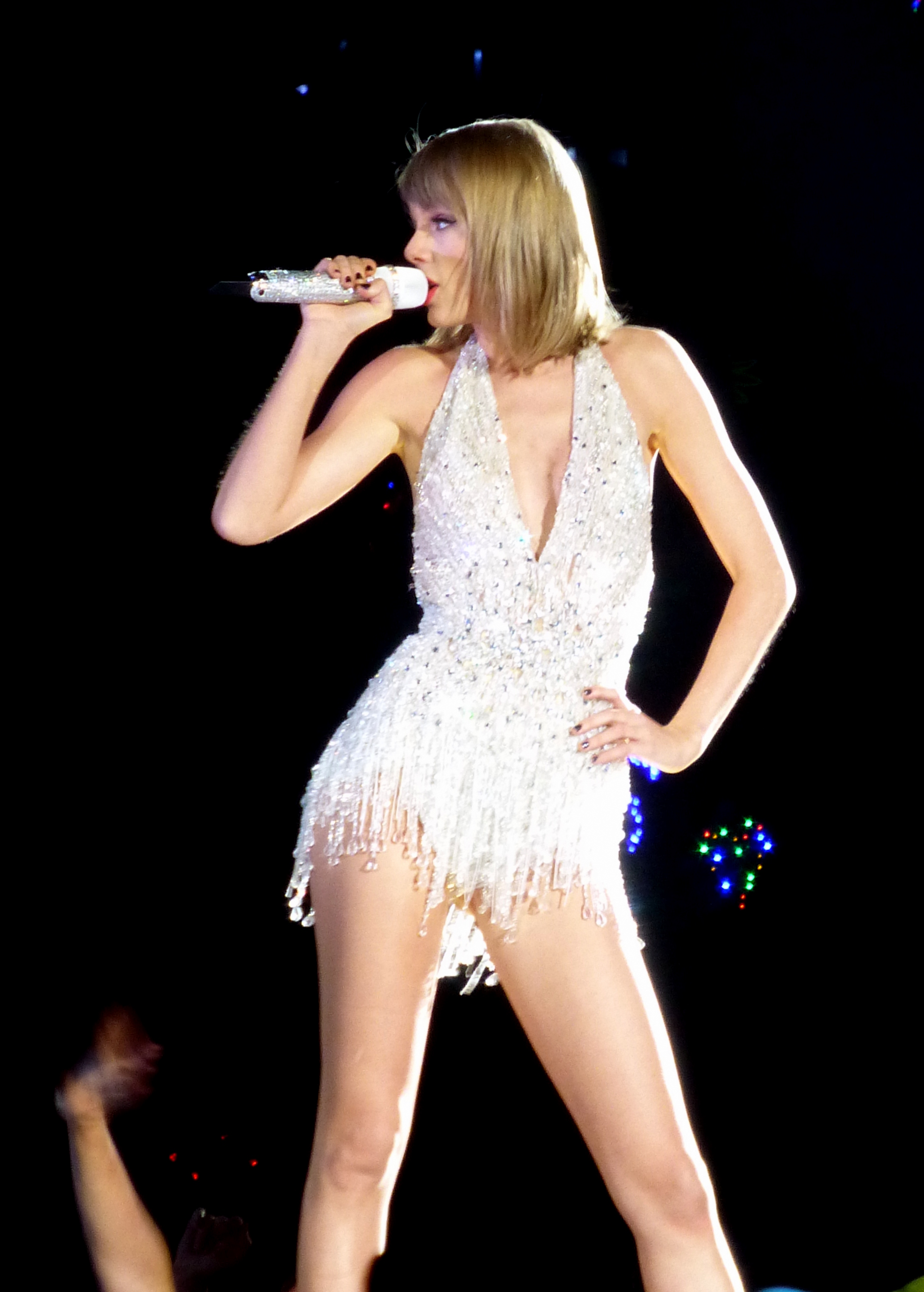
"Shake It Off", the lead single from Taylor Swift's fifth studio album 1989, ranked 13.

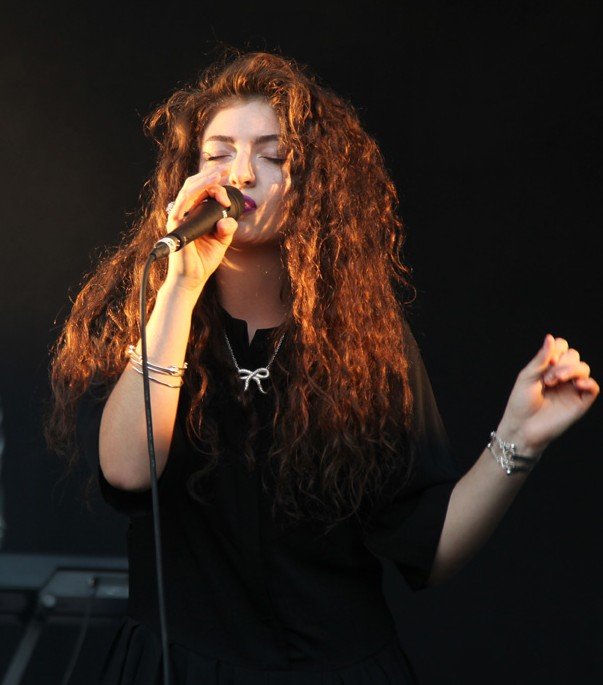
New Zealand recording artist Lorde has two singles in the top 20, with "Team" (number 18) and "Royals" (number 20).

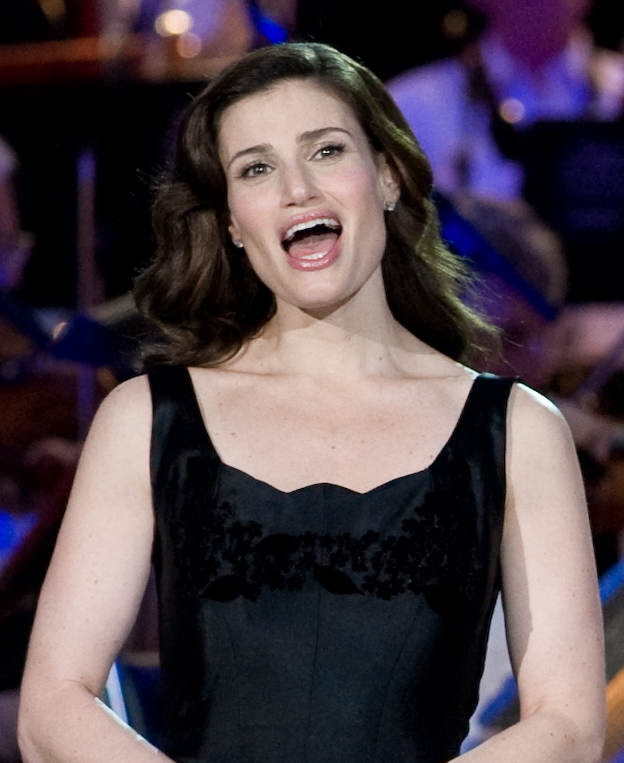
"Let It Go" from Frozen is number 21 on the 2014 year-end chart. It became the first song from a Disney animated musical to reach the top 10 of the Hot 100 since Vanessa L. Williams's "Colors of the Wind" from Pocahontas in 1995 and is also Idina Menzel's highest-charting single.

List of songs on Billboard's 2014 Year-End Hot 100 chart
No.	Title	Artist(s)
1	"Happy"	Pharrell Williams
2	"Dark Horse"	Katy Perry featuring Juicy J
3	"All of Me"	John Legend
4	"Fancy"	Iggy Azalea featuring Charli XCX
5	"Counting Stars"	OneRepublic
6	"Talk Dirty"	Jason Derulo featuring 2 Chainz
7	"Rude"	Magic!
8	"All About That Bass"	Meghan Trainor
9	"Problem"	Ariana Grande featuring Iggy Azalea
10	"Stay with Me"	Sam Smith
11	"Timber"	Pitbull featuring Kesha
12	"Pompeii"	Bastille
13	"Shake It Off"	Taylor Swift
14	"Am I Wrong"	Nico & Vinz
15	"Turn Down for What"	DJ Snake and Lil Jon
16	"The Monster"	Eminem featuring Rihanna
17	"Say Something"	A Great Big World and Christina Aguilera
18	"Team"	Lorde
19	"Let Her Go"	Passenger
20	"Royals"	Lorde
21	"Let It Go"	Idina Menzel
22	"Wake Me Up"	Avicii
23	"Demons"	Imagine Dragons
24	"Story of My Life"	One Direction
25	"Chandelier"	Sia
26	"Black Widow"	Iggy Azalea featuring Rita Ora
27	"Bang Bang"	Jessie J, Ariana Grande and Nicki Minaj
28	"Latch"	Disclosure featuring Sam Smith
29	"Maps"	Maroon 5
30	"Loyal"	Chris Brown featuring Lil Wayne and French Montana or Too Short or Tyga
31	"Best Day of My Life"	American Authors
32	"Habits (Stay High)"	Tove Lo
33	"Summer"	Calvin Harris
34	"Boom Clap"	Charli XCX
35	"Drunk in Love"	Beyoncé featuring Jay-Z
36	"Anaconda"	Nicki Minaj
37	"Break Free"	Ariana Grande featuring Zedd
38	"Bailando"	Enrique Iglesias featuring Descemer Bueno and Gente de Zona
39	"Burn"	Ellie Goulding
40	"Wiggle"	Jason Derulo featuring Snoop Dogg
41	"Rather Be"	Clean Bandit featuring Jess Glynne
42	"Don't Tell 'Em"	Jeremih featuring YG
43	"Show Me"	Kid Ink featuring Chris Brown
44	"Wrecking Ball"	Miley Cyrus
45	"Not a Bad Thing"	Justin Timberlake
46	"Roar"	Katy Perry
47	"Ain't It Fun"	Paramore
48	"The Man"	Aloe Blacc
49	"This Is How We Roll"	Florida Georgia Line featuring Luke Bryan
50	"Classic"	MKTO
51	"A Sky Full of Stars"	Coldplay
52	"Don't"	Ed Sheeran
53	"Na Na"	Trey Songz
54	"Hot Boy"	Bobby Shmurda
55	"Hold On, We're Going Home"	Drake featuring Majid Jordan
56	"Sing"	Ed Sheeran
57	"Radioactive"	Imagine Dragons
58	"My Hitta"	YG featuring Jeezy and Rich Homie Quan
59	"Cool Kids"	Echosmith
60	"Hey Brother"	Avicii
61	"Trumpets"	Jason Derulo
62	"Animals"	Maroon 5
63	"Burnin' It Down"	Jason Aldean
64	"Play It Again"	Luke Bryan
65	"2 On"	Tinashe featuring ScHoolboy Q
66	"Dirt"	Florida Georgia Line
67	"Love Runs Out"	OneRepublic
68	"Bottoms Up"	Brantley Gilbert
69	"Shower"	Becky G
70	"Me and My Broken Heart"	Rixton
71	"Animals"	Martin Garrix
72	"Lifestyle"	Rich Gang featuring Young Thug and Rich Homie Quan
73	"American Kids"	Kenny Chesney
74	"Brave"	Sara Bareilles
75	"Sweater Weather"	The Neighbourhood
76	"Leave the Night On"	Sam Hunt
77	"New Flame"	Chris Brown featuring Usher and Rick Ross
78	"Love Never Felt So Good"	Michael Jackson and Justin Timberlake
79	"Drunk on a Plane"	Dierks Bentley
80	"Birthday"	Katy Perry
81	"Bartender"	Lady Antebellum
82	"La La La"	Naughty Boy featuring Sam Smith
83	"Blurred Lines"	Robin Thicke featuring T.I. and Pharrell Williams
84	"Do What U Want"	Lady Gaga featuring R. Kelly
85	"Can't Remember to Forget You"	Shakira featuring Rihanna
86	"Amnesia"	5 Seconds of Summer
87	"No Mediocre"	T.I. featuring Iggy Azalea
88	"Come with Me Now"	KONGOS
89	"Believe Me"	Lil Wayne featuring Drake
90	"23"	Mike WiLL Made-It featuring Miley Cyrus, Wiz Khalifa, and Juicy J
91	"Beachin'"	Jake Owen
92	"White Walls"	Macklemore & Ryan Lewis featuring ScHoolboy Q and Hollis
93	"She Looks So Perfect"	5 Seconds of Summer
94	"Stay the Night"	Zedd featuring Hayley Williams
95	"Partition"	Beyoncé
96	"Studio"	ScHoolboy Q featuring BJ the Chicago Kid
97	"0 to 100 / The Catch Up"	Drake
98	"I Don't Dance"	Lee Brice
99	"Somethin' Bad"	Miranda Lambert and Carrie Underwood
100	"Adore You"	Miley Cyrus

== See also ==
- 2014 in American music
- Billboard Year-End Hot R&B/Hip-Hop Songs of 2014
- Billboard Year-End Hot Rap Songs of 2014
- List of Billboard Hot 100 number-one singles of 2014
- List of Billboard Hot 100 top-ten singles in 2014
