= Billboard Year-End Hot Rap Songs of 2014 =

American music chart

This is a list of Billboard magazine's Top Hot Rap Songs of 2014.

No.	Title	Artist(s)
1	"Fancy"	Iggy Azalea featuring Charli XCX
2	"Timber"	Pitbull featuring Kesha
3	"The Monster"	Eminem featuring Rihanna
4	"Black Widow"	Iggy Azalea featuring Rita Ora
5	"Anaconda"	Nicki Minaj
6	"Show Me"	Kid Ink featuring Chris Brown
7	"Hot Nigga"	Bobby Shmurda
8	"Shower"	Becky G
9	"My Nigga"	YG featuring Jeezy and Rich Homie Quan
10	"Lifestyle"	Rich Gang featuring Young Thug and Rich Homie Quan
11	"No Mediocre"	T.I. featuring Iggy Azalea
12	"23"	Mike Will Made It featuring Miley Cyrus, Wiz Khalifa and Juicy J
13	"White Walls"	Macklemore & Ryan Lewis featuring Schoolboy Q and Hollis
14	"Studio"	Schoolboy Q featuring BJ the Chicago Kid
15	"Believe Me"	Lil Wayne featuring Drake
16	"0 to 100 / The Catch Up"	Drake
17	"Pills n Potions"	Nicki Minaj
18	"We Dem Boyz"	Wiz Khalifa
19	"Fireball"	Pitbull featuring John Ryan
20	"Rap God"	Eminem
21	"No Flex Zone"	Rae Sremmurd
22	"Trophies"	Young Money featuring Drake
23	"Who Do You Love?"	YG featuring Drake
24	"All Me"	Drake featuring 2 Chainz and Big Sean
25	"Wild Wild Love"	Pitbull featuring G.R.L.
26	"Move That Dope"	Future featuring Pharrell Williams, Pusha T and Casino
27	"About the Money"	T.I. featuring Young Thug
28	"Main Chick"	Kid Ink featuring Chris Brown
29	"Work"	Iggy Azalea
30	"Cut Her Off"	K Camp featuring 2 Chainz
31	"Stoner"	Young Thug
32	"I Don't Fuck with You"	Big Sean featuring E-40
33	"No Type"	Rae Sremmurd
34	"Man of the Year"	Schoolboy Q
35	"Holy Grail"	Jay-Z featuring Justin Timberlake
36	"Fight Night"	Migos
37	"3005"	Childish Gambino
38	"The Language"	Drake
39	"Part II (On the Run)"	Jay-Z featuring Beyoncé
40	"Gas Pedal"	Sage the Gemini featuring Iamsu!
41	"I"	Kendrick Lamar
42	"Hookah"	Tyga featuring Young Thug
43	"Headlights"	Eminem featuring Nate Ruess
44	"Bound 2"	Kanye West
45	"Berzerk"	Eminem
46	"I Won"	Future featuring Kanye West
47	"Survival"	Eminem
48	"24 Hours"	TeeFlii featuring 2 Chainz
49	"Walk Thru"	Rich Homie Quan featuring Problem
50	"L.A. Love (La La)"	Fergie

== See also ==
- 2014 in music
- Billboard Year-End Hot 100 singles of 2014
- Billboard Year-End Hot R&B/Hip-Hop Songs of 2014
- List of Billboard number-one rap singles of 2014
