= List of number-one R&B/hip-hop songs of 2014 (U.S.) =

This page lists the songs that reached number-one on the overall Hot R&B/Hip-Hop Songs chart, the R&B Songs chart (which was created in 2012), and the Hot Rap Songs chart in 2014. The R&B Songs and Rap Songs charts partly serve as distillations of the overall R&B/Hip-Hop Songs chart.

== List of number ones ==
Key
†	Indicates best-charting R&B/Hip-Hop, R&B, Rap and Airplay singles of 2014

Issue date	R&B/Hip-Hop Songs	Artist	R&B Songs	Artist	Rap Songs	Artist	R&B/Hip-Hop Airplay	Artist	Refs.
January 4	"The Monster"	Eminem featuring Rihanna	"Drunk in Love"	Beyoncé featuring Jay-Z	"The Monster"	Eminem featuring Rihanna	"Hold On, We're Going Home"	Drake featuring Majid Jordan	
January 11	"The Monster"	Eminem featuring Rihanna	"Hold On, We're Going Home"	Drake featuring Majid Jordan	"The Monster"	Eminem featuring Rihanna	"Hold On, We're Going Home"	Drake featuring Majid Jordan	
January 18	"The Monster"	Eminem featuring Rihanna	"Drunk in Love"	Beyoncé featuring Jay-Z	"Timber"	Pitbull featuring Kesha	"Hold On, We're Going Home"	Drake featuring Majid Jordan	
January 25	"The Monster"	Eminem featuring Rihanna	"Drunk in Love"	Beyoncé featuring Jay-Z	"Timber"	Pitbull featuring Kesha	"Hold On, We're Going Home"	Drake featuring Majid Jordan	
February 1	"The Monster"	Eminem featuring Rihanna	"Drunk in Love"	Beyoncé featuring Jay-Z	"Timber"	Pitbull featuring Kesha	"Drunk in Love"	Beyoncé featuring Jay-Z	
February 8	"The Monster"	Eminem featuring Rihanna	"Talk Dirty"	Jason Derulo featuring 2 Chainz	"Timber"	Pitbull featuring Kesha	"Drunk in Love"	Beyoncé featuring Jay-Z	
February 15	"Drunk in Love"	Beyoncé featuring Jay-Z	"Drunk in Love"	Beyoncé featuring Jay-Z	"Timber"	Pitbull featuring Kesha	"Drunk in Love"	Beyoncé featuring Jay-Z	
February 22	"Happy" †	Pharrell Williams	"Happy" †	Pharrell Williams	"Timber"	Pitbull featuring Kesha	"Drunk in Love"	Beyoncé featuring Jay-Z	
March 1	"Happy" †	Pharrell Williams	"Happy" †	Pharrell Williams	"Timber"	Pitbull featuring Kesha	"Drunk in Love"	Beyoncé featuring Jay-Z	
March 8	"Happy" †	Pharrell Williams	"Happy" †	Pharrell Williams	"Timber"	Pitbull featuring Kesha	"Drunk in Love"	Beyoncé featuring Jay-Z	
March 15	"Happy" †	Pharrell Williams	"Happy" †	Pharrell Williams	"Timber"	Pitbull featuring Kesha	"Drunk in Love"	Beyoncé featuring Jay-Z	
March 22	"Happy" †	Pharrell Williams	"Happy" †	Pharrell Williams	"Timber"	Pitbull featuring Kesha	"Drunk in Love"	Beyoncé featuring Jay-Z	
March 29	"Happy" †	Pharrell Williams	"Happy" †	Pharrell Williams	"Timber"	Pitbull featuring Kesha	"Happy"	Pharrell Williams	
April 5	"Happy" †	Pharrell Williams	"Happy" †	Pharrell Williams	"Timber"	Pitbull featuring Kesha	"Happy"	Pharrell Williams	
April 12	"Happy" †	Pharrell Williams	"Happy" †	Pharrell Williams	"Timber"	Pitbull featuring Kesha	"Happy"	Pharrell Williams	
April 19	"Happy" †	Pharrell Williams	"Happy" †	Pharrell Williams	"Timber"	Pitbull featuring Kesha	"Happy"	Pharrell Williams	
April 26	"Happy" †	Pharrell Williams	"Happy" †	Pharrell Williams	"Timber"	Pitbull featuring Kesha	"Happy"	Pharrell Williams	
May 3	"Happy" †	Pharrell Williams	"Happy" †	Pharrell Williams	"Fancy" †	Iggy Azalea featuring Charli XCX	"Happy"	Pharrell Williams	
May 10	"Happy" †	Pharrell Williams	"Happy" †	Pharrell Williams	"Fancy" †	Iggy Azalea featuring Charli XCX	"Happy"	Pharrell Williams	
May 17	"All of Me"	John Legend	"All of Me"	John Legend	"Fancy" †	Iggy Azalea featuring Charli XCX	"The Worst"	Jhené Aiko	
May 24	"All of Me"	John Legend	"All of Me"	John Legend	"Fancy" †	Iggy Azalea featuring Charli XCX	"The Worst"	Jhené Aiko	
May 31	"All of Me"	John Legend	"All of Me"	John Legend	"Fancy" †	Iggy Azalea featuring Charli XCX	"The Worst"	Jhené Aiko	
June 7	"Fancy"	Iggy Azalea featuring Charli XCX	"All of Me"	John Legend	"Fancy" †	Iggy Azalea featuring Charli XCX	"Loyal" †	Chris Brown featuring Lil Wayne and Tyga	
June 14	"Fancy"	Iggy Azalea featuring Charli XCX	"All of Me"	John Legend	"Fancy" †	Iggy Azalea featuring Charli XCX	"Loyal" †	Chris Brown featuring Lil Wayne and Tyga	
June 21	"Fancy"	Iggy Azalea featuring Charli XCX	"All of Me"	John Legend	"Fancy" †	Iggy Azalea featuring Charli XCX	"Loyal" †	Chris Brown featuring Lil Wayne and Tyga	
June 28	"Fancy"	Iggy Azalea featuring Charli XCX	"All of Me"	John Legend	"Fancy" †	Iggy Azalea featuring Charli XCX	"Loyal" †	Chris Brown featuring Lil Wayne and Tyga	
July 5	"Fancy"	Iggy Azalea featuring Charli XCX	"Wiggle"	Jason Derulo featuring Snoop Dogg	"Fancy" †	Iggy Azalea featuring Charli XCX	"Loyal" †	Chris Brown featuring Lil Wayne and Tyga	
July 12	"Fancy"	Iggy Azalea featuring Charli XCX	"Wiggle"	Jason Derulo featuring Snoop Dogg	"Fancy" †	Iggy Azalea featuring Charli XCX	"Loyal" †	Chris Brown featuring Lil Wayne and Tyga	
July 19	"Fancy"	Iggy Azalea featuring Charli XCX	"Wiggle"	Jason Derulo featuring Snoop Dogg	"Fancy" †	Iggy Azalea featuring Charli XCX	"Good Kisser"	Usher	
July 26	"Fancy"	Iggy Azalea featuring Charli XCX	"Wiggle"	Jason Derulo featuring Snoop Dogg	"Fancy" †	Iggy Azalea featuring Charli XCX	"Loyal" †	Chris Brown featuring Lil Wayne and Tyga	
August 2	"Fancy"	Iggy Azalea featuring Charli XCX	"All of Me"	John Legend	"Fancy" †	Iggy Azalea featuring Charli XCX	"Loyal" †	Chris Brown featuring Lil Wayne and Tyga	
August 9	"Fancy"	Iggy Azalea featuring Charli XCX	"All of Me"	John Legend	"Fancy" †	Iggy Azalea featuring Charli XCX	"Believe Me"	Lil Wayne featuring Drake	
August 16	"Fancy"	Iggy Azalea featuring Charli XCX	"All of Me"	John Legend	"Fancy" †	Iggy Azalea featuring Charli XCX	"Studio"	Schoolboy Q featuring BJ the Chicago Kid	
August 23	"Fancy"	Iggy Azalea featuring Charli XCX	"All of Me"	John Legend	"Fancy" †	Iggy Azalea featuring Charli XCX	"Studio"	Schoolboy Q featuring BJ the Chicago Kid	
August 30	"Fancy"	Iggy Azalea featuring Charli XCX	"All of Me"	John Legend	"Fancy" †	Iggy Azalea featuring Charli XCX	"Studio"	Schoolboy Q featuring BJ the Chicago Kid	
September 6	"Anaconda"	Nicki Minaj	"Don't Tell 'Em"	Jeremih featuring YG	"Anaconda"	Nicki Minaj	"Don't Tell 'Em"	Jeremih featuring YG	
September 13	"Anaconda"	Nicki Minaj	"Don't Tell 'Em"	Jeremih featuring YG	"Anaconda"	Nicki Minaj	"Don't Tell 'Em"	Jeremih featuring YG	
September 20	"Anaconda"	Nicki Minaj	"Don't Tell 'Em"	Jeremih featuring YG	"Anaconda"	Nicki Minaj	"Don't Tell 'Em"	Jeremih featuring YG	
September 27	"Anaconda"	Nicki Minaj	"Don't Tell 'Em"	Jeremih featuring YG	"Anaconda"	Nicki Minaj	"Don't Tell 'Em"	Jeremih featuring YG	
October 4	"Anaconda"	Nicki Minaj	"Don't Tell 'Em"	Jeremih featuring YG	"Anaconda"	Nicki Minaj	"Don't Tell 'Em"	Jeremih featuring YG	
October 11	"Anaconda"	Nicki Minaj	"Don't Tell 'Em"	Jeremih featuring YG	"Anaconda"	Nicki Minaj	"Don't Tell 'Em"	Jeremih featuring YG	
October 18	"Black Widow"	Iggy Azalea featuring Rita Ora	"Don't Tell 'Em"	Jeremih featuring YG	"Black Widow"	Iggy Azalea featuring Rita Ora	"Lifestyle"	Rich Gang featuring Young Thug & Rich Homie Quan	
October 25	"Black Widow"	Iggy Azalea featuring Rita Ora	"Don't Tell 'Em"	Jeremih featuring YG	"Black Widow"	Iggy Azalea featuring Rita Ora	"New Flame"	Chris Brown featuring Usher & Rick Ross	
November 1	"Black Widow"	Iggy Azalea featuring Rita Ora	"Don't Tell 'Em"	Jeremih featuring YG	"Black Widow"	Iggy Azalea featuring Rita Ora	"New Flame"	Chris Brown featuring Usher & Rick Ross	
November 8	"Black Widow"	Iggy Azalea featuring Rita Ora	"Don't Tell 'Em"	Jeremih featuring YG	"Black Widow"	Iggy Azalea featuring Rita Ora	"New Flame"	Chris Brown featuring Usher & Rick Ross	
November 15	"Black Widow"	Iggy Azalea featuring Rita Ora	"Don't Tell 'Em"	Jeremih featuring YG	"Black Widow"	Iggy Azalea featuring Rita Ora	"Hold You Down"	DJ Khaled featuring Chris Brown, August Alsina, Future & Jeremih	
November 22	"Hot Nigga"	Bobby Shmurda	"Don't Tell 'Em"	Jeremih featuring YG	"Hot Nigga"	Bobby Shmurda	"Hold You Down"	DJ Khaled featuring Chris Brown, August Alsina, Future & Jeremih	
November 29	"Hot Nigga"	Bobby Shmurda	"Tuesday"	ILoveMakonnen featuring Drake	"Hot Nigga"	Bobby Shmurda	"Hold You Down"	DJ Khaled featuring Chris Brown, August Alsina, Future & Jeremih	
December 6	"I Don't Fuck with You"	Big Sean featuring E-40	"Tuesday"	ILoveMakonnen featuring Drake	"I Don't Fuck with You"	Big Sean featuring E-40	"Hold You Down"	DJ Khaled featuring Chris Brown, August Alsina, Future & Jeremih	
December 13	"I Don't Fuck with You"	Big Sean featuring E-40	"Tuesday"	ILoveMakonnen featuring Drake	"I Don't Fuck with You"	Big Sean featuring E-40	"Tuesday"	ILoveMakonnen featuring Drake	
December 20	"7/11"	Beyoncé	"7/11"	Beyoncé	"I Don't Fuck with You"	Big Sean featuring E-40	"Hold You Down"	DJ Khaled featuring Chris Brown, August Alsina, Future & Jeremih	
December 27	"Only"	Nicki Minaj featuring Drake, Lil Wayne & Chris Brown	"Tuesday"	ILoveMakonnen featuring Drake	"Only"	Nicki Minaj featuring Drake, Lil Wayne & Chris Brown	"Tuesday"	ILoveMakonnen featuring Drake	

== See also ==
- Billboard Year-End Hot R&B/Hip-Hop Songs of 2014
- List of Billboard Hot 100 number-one singles of 2014
- List of Billboard number-one R&B/hip-hop albums of 2014
