= List of Billboard number-one R&B/hip-hop albums of 2014 =

This page lists the albums that reached number one on the overall Top R&B/Hip-Hop Albums chart, the R&B Albums chart (introduced in 2013), and the Rap Albums chart in 2014. The R&B Albums and Rap Albums charts serve as partial distillations of the overall R&B/Hip-Hop Albums chart.

Note that Billboard publishes charts with an issue date approximately 7–10 days in advance.

== List of number ones ==
Key
†	Indicates best-charting R&B/Hip-Hop, R&B and Rap albums of 2014

Issue date	R&B/Hip-Hop Albums	Artist(s)	R&B Albums	Artist(s)	Rap Albums	Artist(s)	Refs.
January 4	Beyoncé †	Beyoncé	Beyoncé †	Beyoncé	The Marshall Mathers LP 2 †	Eminem	
January 11	Beyoncé †	Beyoncé	Beyoncé †	Beyoncé	The Marshall Mathers LP 2 †	Eminem	
January 18	Beyoncé †	Beyoncé	Beyoncé †	Beyoncé	The Marshall Mathers LP 2 †	Eminem	
January 25	Beyoncé †	Beyoncé	Beyoncé †	Beyoncé	My Own Lane	Kid Ink	
February 1	Beyoncé †	Beyoncé	Beyoncé †	Beyoncé	The Marshall Mathers LP 2 †	Eminem	
February 8	Beyoncé †	Beyoncé	Beyoncé †	Beyoncé	The Marshall Mathers LP 2 †	Eminem	
February 15	Beyoncé †	Beyoncé	Beyoncé †	Beyoncé	The Heist	Macklemore & Ryan Lewis	
February 22	Love, Marriage & Divorce	Toni Braxton and Babyface	Love, Marriage & Divorce	Toni Braxton and Babyface	The Marshall Mathers LP 2 †	Eminem	
March 1	Beyoncé †	Beyoncé	Beyoncé †	Beyoncé	The Marshall Mathers LP 2 †	Eminem	
March 8	Beyoncé †	Beyoncé	Beyoncé †	Beyoncé	The Marshall Mathers LP 2 †	Eminem	
March 15	Oxymoron	Schoolboy Q	Beyoncé †	Beyoncé	Oxymoron	Schoolboy Q	
March 22	Mastermind	Rick Ross	Girl	Pharrell Williams	Mastermind	Rick Ross	
March 29	Mastermind	Rick Ross	Lift Your Spirit	Aloe Blacc	Mastermind	Rick Ross	
April 5	My Krazy Life	YG	Girl	Pharrell Williams	My Krazy Life	YG	
April 12	Girl	Pharrell Williams	Girl	Pharrell Williams	My Krazy Life	YG	
April 19	Girl	Pharrell Williams	Girl	Pharrell Williams	My Krazy Life	YG	
April 26	Girl	Pharrell Williams	Girl	Pharrell Williams	My Krazy Life	YG	
May 3	Testimony	August Alsina	Testimony	August Alsina	The Marshall Mathers LP 2 †	Eminem	
May 10	Honest	Future	Girl	Pharrell Williams	Honest	Future	
May 17	The New Classic	Iggy Azalea	Girl	Pharrell Williams	The New Classic	Iggy Azalea	
May 24	Strangeulation	Tech N9ne	Girl	Pharrell Williams	Strangeulation	Tech N9ne	
May 31	Xscape	Michael Jackson	Xscape	Michael Jackson	The New Classic	Iggy Azalea	
June 7	Xscape	Michael Jackson	Xscape	Michael Jackson	The New Classic	Iggy Azalea	
June 14	Me. I Am Mariah... The Elusive Chanteuse	Mariah Carey	Me. I Am Mariah... The Elusive Chanteuse	Mariah Carey	The New Classic	Iggy Azalea	
June 21	Animal Ambition	50 Cent	Xscape	Michael Jackson	Animal Ambition	50 Cent	
June 28	Xscape	Michael Jackson	Xscape	Michael Jackson	Animal Ambition	50 Cent	
July 5	A.K.A.	Jennifer Lopez	A.K.A.	Jennifer Lopez	The New Classic	Iggy Azalea	
July 12	These Things Happen	G-Eazy	Bridges	Joe	These Things Happen	G-Eazy	
July 19	Trigga	Trey Songz	Trigga	Trey Songz	Thanks for Listening	Colt Ford	
July 26	Trigga	Trey Songz	Trigga	Trey Songz	Closer	Mike Stud	
August 2	Trigga	Trey Songz	Trigga	Trey Songz	The New Classic	Iggy Azalea	
August 9	Nobody's Smiling	Common	Trigga	Trey Songz	Nobody's Smiling	Common	
August 16	PartyNextDoor Two	PartyNextDoor	PartyNextDoor Two	PartyNextDoor	The New Classic	Iggy Azalea	
August 23	The New Classic	Iggy Azalea	Trigga	Trey Songz	The New Classic	Iggy Azalea	
August 30	Stronger	Tank	Stronger	Tank	The New Classic	Iggy Azalea	
September 6	Blacc Hollywood	Wiz Khalifa	Smokey & Friends	Smokey Robinson	Blacc Hollywood	Wiz Khalifa	
September 13	Promise To Love: Album IV	Kem	Promise To Love: Album IV	Kem	Blacc Hollywood	Wiz Khalifa	
September 20	Seen It All: The Autobiography	Jeezy	Promise To Love: Album IV	Kem	Seen It All: The Autobiography	Jeezy	
September 27	Souled Out	Jhené Aiko	Souled Out	Jhené Aiko	Anomaly	Lecrae	
October 4	X	Chris Brown	X	Chris Brown	Anomaly	Lecrae	
October 11	X	Chris Brown	X	Chris Brown	Anomaly	Lecrae	
October 18	Art Official Age	Prince	Art Official Age	Prince	Kauai	Childish Gambino	
October 25	Point of No Return	Keyshia Cole	Point of No Return	Keyshia Cole	Kauai	Childish Gambino	
November 1	Blood Moon: Year of the Wolf	The Game	X	Chris Brown	Blood Moon: Year of the Wolf	The Game	
November 8	Paperwork	T.I.	Aretha Franklin Sings the Great Diva Classics	Aretha Franklin	Paperwork	T.I.	
November 15	Paperwork	T.I.	J.E. Heartbreak 2	Jagged Edge	Paperwork	T.I.	
November 22	VII	Teyana Taylor	VII	Teyana Taylor	Paperwork	T.I.	
November 29	Cadillactica	Big K.R.I.T.	Whitney Houston Live: Her Greatest Performances	Whitney Houston	Cadillactica	Big K.R.I.T.	
December 6	Cadillactica	Big K.R.I.T.	Whitney Houston Live: Her Greatest Performances	Whitney Houston	Cadillactica	Big K.R.I.T.	
December 13	Shady XV	Shady Records	More	Beyoncé	Shady XV	Shady Records	
December 20	The London Sessions	Mary J. Blige	The London Sessions	Mary J. Blige	Shady XV	Shady Records	
December 27	2014 Forest Hills Drive	J. Cole	Anybody Wanna Buy a Heart?	K. Michelle	2014 Forest Hills Drive	J. Cole	

== See also ==
- 2014 in music
- List of Billboard 200 number-one albums of 2014
- List of number-one R&B/hip-hop songs of 2014 (U.S.)
