= List of Clueless characters =

Characters in American film and TV show

This is a list of characters in the original film version of the American teen comedy Clueless (1995) and the subsequent television series of the same name, which premiered in 1996.

The original characters were created by Amy Heckerling, writer and director of the film, who was inspired by Jane Austen's novel Emma. The main character, Cher Horowitz, is a rich girl from Beverly Hills, California, whom Heckerling has described as "positive and happy".

== Cher Horowitz ==
(Alicia Silverstone in the film, Rachel Blanchard in the series)

Cher is a sweet, if somewhat dippy, blonde teenager who lives with her father in Beverly Hills, California. Cher often speaks in Valley Girl slang (including new idioms coined by the writers of Clueless). Her role in the film and series is that of the central protagonist; many of the plot lines revolve around, or involve, Cher in some way, although sub-plots, particularly in the TV series, allow the focus to shift from her toward others and back.

Cher is popular with her classmates; she often uses her social status and skill to aid others. Yet these crusades are not always as successful as she would wish. Much of the film's plot centers around Cher's gradual realization that her judgment is not infallible—such as with her attempts to give Tai a makeover—and that Cher may benefit more from attempting to improve herself. However, some of Cher's attempts at righting the world's minor wrongs indeed produce the results she anticipates, such as her matchmaking attempt between two of her teachers.

As the daughter of a lawyer, Cher has developed extensive conversational skills. She can frequently talk teachers into improving her grades, and she excels in Mr. Hall's debate class. However, Cher's efforts to talk her way out of trouble are not always successful, such as when she fails her driver's test due to her sub-par driving skills. Josh is often the first to point out when Cher "finds a situation she can't talk her way out of."

Cher's knowledge is not without flaws, particularly in relation to certain elements of history and culture. For instance, in a voiceover, she calls the film Spartacus "Sporadicus." Then, in her debate class, she repeatedly pronounces the word "Haitians" as "Hatey-yuns."

== Mel Horowitz ==
(Dan Hedaya in the film; Michael Lerner in the first TV season; Doug Sheehan in subsequent seasons)

Mel is a litigator who makes $500 an hour. He is the father of Cher and ex-stepfather to Josh. He is a single man, having had a number of relationships prior to the events of Clueless; he is divorced from a somewhat brief marriage to Josh's mother, and Cher's own mother is deceased.

Mel is somewhat overprotective of Cher, heavily scrutinizing her dates, and also has a strong dislike for her taste in revealing clothing. Apart from this, he is proud of his daughter's accomplishments, her good works for himself and others, and her attempts at self betterment, including her debating skills.

Mel is dedicated to his career, and often allows Josh, an aspiring environmental lawyer, to assist on his cases. He also accepts help from Cher on occasion, though Cher's ineptitude in this field means she is not as much use to her father.

In the film, a prop envelope is seen giving Mel's surname as Hamilton (a continuity problem); he is also listed in the closing credits as "Mel Hamilton."

== Josh Lucas ==
(Paul Rudd in the film, David Lascher in the series)

Josh is the son of Mel's ex-wife, and thus Cher's former step-brother. He is actually from Seattle, Washington, but goes to college in L.A. He has an apartment of his own near school, but often returns to the Horowitz home, particularly when he is not on good terms with his mother's current husband. He also relishes any opportunity to work alongside Mel, in order to pick up skills for his potential career in environmental law. Mel is clearly close to Josh, stating to Cher in the film, "You divorce wives, not children", suggesting he thinks of Josh as a son.

Josh is an environmentalist, and often raises the issue as part of wider gloating. For much of the film he considers himself superior to Cher, often impugning Cher's pop-culture obsessed worldview, and choosing to watch CNN over Cher's choices of Beavis and Butt-Head and The Ren & Stimpy Show. Although he often teases Cher, he ultimately feels compassion for her, as shown when he defends her following her blunder with her father's legal papers.

During the course of the film, Cher realizes she is romantically interested in Josh, but also observes that because they are already familiar to each other, she is unable to employ her usual seduction techniques. By the close of the film they are dating.

The character of Josh only appears in the first of the three TV seasons. Paul Rudd appears as a character named Sonny in one episode (I Got You Babe) of the TV series.

== Dionne Davenport ==
(Stacey Dash in the film and the series)

Dionne is Cher's closest friend and confidante. She is a fashionable, upmarket young woman who, like Cher, possesses a high social standing. However, she is less willing to "use (her) popularity for a good cause" than Cher. However, Cher is usually able to convince her to be involved in her schemes, such as the matchmaking of Mr. Hall and Ms. Geist.

Dionne occasionally uses Valley Girl slang similar to that used by Cher and others, though does not use it extensively; Dionne is well-spoken and clearly intelligent—at times, it seems, more so than Cher.

Dionne is involved in a steady relationship with Murray Duvall through the majority of the film and TV series; their relationship is seen by many to be somewhat volatile (with their large-scale public spats being a common sight), but they do also care for each other. Dionne states during the film that she is a virgin, though later, after a frightening experience on the freeway, Dionne's virginity goes "from technical to non-existent," according to Cher. The sexual element of their relationship is not raised in the television series until the final episode.

== Tai Frasier ==
(Brittany Murphy in the film, Heather Gottlieb in the series)

Tai is a transfer student who arrives at Bronson Alcott High School, and instantly stands out due to her differences in appearance and attitude to the other students. Much of the film focuses on Cher's "project" to make Tai attractive and popular, and, after this fails, her subsequent realization that it is Tai's personal substance that is important rather than her physical appearance or popularity.

Tai quickly forms a bond with slacker Travis after meeting him in the school cafeteria. However, Cher feels that a "loadie" boyfriend would hamper her attempts to bring Tai into the popular clique; consequently, Cher makes extensive efforts to set Tai up with the wealthy and popular Elton. However, this backfires when it is revealed that Elton is more interested in Cher. These misfiring matchmaking attempts, coupled with Tai's rising popularity following an incident at the shopping mall in which she is held over a balcony, drive a wedge between Tai and Cher. Cher ultimately realizes that she cannot force Tai to become something she is not, and that Tai would be happier with Travis in her life. By the end of the film Tai has patched up her differences with Cher and apparently begun to date Travis, who is her date to Mr. Hall and Ms. Geist's wedding.

Tai's past experiences with sex and drugs are more extensive than those of the other students (though these past experiences are only implied, and not seen directly on screen). Some of the references go over the other students' heads: when Tai refers to cannabis as "herbal refreshment," Cher assumes that she is talking about tea (however, this is instantly followed by a similar misunderstanding in the other direction; when Cher refers to Coca-Cola as Coke, Tai assumes she is actually referring to cocaine).

Tai's role in the TV series is significantly smaller than in the movie, and she was dropped altogether by the second season. Brittany Murphy appeared in the episode "Driving Me Crazy" as a character named Jasmine.

== Amber Mariens ==
(Elisa Donovan in the film and the series)

Amber is a member of the in-crowd at school, fulfilling the stereotype of popular girls being snobbish, mean-spirited and spiteful. She is despised by both Cher and Dionne, and is in constant competition with Cher throughout the film when it comes to style, popularity, and boys. Cher refers to her as a "Monet" (just like the painting, "from far away it's okay, but up close it's a big old mess.") Amber coexists with Cher, Dionne, and Tai (post-makeover) despite her snobbish attitudes and bantering. She is apparently a spoiled daughter even by Beverly Hills standards, though her family members are not seen on screen until late in the TV series' run. Her parents, Tripp and Ginger, have a rocky relationship. Tripp Mariens is a weak-willed, cowardly man who dotes on his daughter and repeatedly gives in to her constant whims and demands, whereas Ginger Mariens is a fearsome battleaxe who sees Amber for the pampered, manipulative brat that she is.

Despite Amber's profession to be a style leader, she often ends up aping Cher, such as attending a party in a dress similar to one which Cher had worn earlier.

Amber becomes the third member of the TV show's central triumvirate along with Cher and Dionne, particularly in later episodes after the character of Tai has been dropped. As the series progresses, Amber's character mellows, and she becomes friends with Cher and Dionne, assisting them in their plans to help others. During the TV series, it is revealed that Amber's middle name is "Princess."

During the TV series, Amber and her family briefly move into Cher and Mel's house (which is supposedly larger and grander than Amber's family home) following Mel's financial failure ("Bakersfield Blues"); however, they subsequently move out when Cher and Mel return to Beverly Hills.

== Christian Stovitz ==
(Justin Walker in the film)

Christian is a high-school student who, due to his parents' divorce, spends alternating semesters at Bronson Alcott High and at a school in Chicago. Upon his arrival at school, Cher instantly takes a shine to him, and attempts to secure him as her boyfriend. Through her attempts to seduce Christian, we see the methods Cher uses to pique boys' interest in her, which include arranging for chocolates and flowers to be sent to herself in school and wearing slightly revealing clothing.

Christian responds to Cher's advances primarily as a way of ferreting out information on parties that he can attend. Cher is oblivious to his homosexual tendencies until Murray later spells it out to her and Dionne. This follows an evening in which Cher unsuccessfully attempts to encourage Christian to have sex with her, Christian preferring to watch the Tony Curtis film Some Like It Hot, in which the principal characters appear in drag throughout much of the movie. Despite the failure of this endeavor, Cher remains on good terms with Christian, primarily due to Cher's admiration of his taste in art and fashion.

Christian is not featured in the TV adaptation.

== Murray Duvall ==
(Donald Faison in the film and TV series)

Murray is Dionne's long-term boyfriend and often engages in public spats with her. Despite their apparently rocky relationship, Murray and Dionne are shown ultimately to care about each other. Murray was also, it is suggested, Dionne's first sexual partner.

Murray is one of the leading male characters, particularly in the TV series, who forms something of a comic double-act with Sean Holliday, with the two often taking part in various schemes and stunts together. Murray and Sean fall out, however, after it is revealed that Dionne had dated Sean prior to Murray (the boys do subsequently patch up their differences).

== Elton Tiscia ==
(Jeremy Sisto in the film)

Elton is a wealthy, arrogant student at Beverly Hills High School. Cher attempts to set Tai up with him, but her attempts fail as Elton is, in fact, more interested in Cher.

Elton's surname is not given in the film. (One online source gives his surname as Tiscia, but this hasn't been factually established thus far.)

Like Travis and Christian, Elton does not appear in the TV series.

== Travis Birkenstock ==
(Breckin Meyer in the film)

Travis is a stoner and skater (and heir to the Birkenstock sandal fortune) who falls for Tai; however, their attempts at courtship are derailed for a time by Cher's attempts to set Tai up with Elton. Travis is an underachiever, constantly late for class and often receives poor grades. He even attempted suicide from the first floor of school upon seeing his report card, and made a speech after getting the most tardies in Mr. Hall’s debate class with 38 tardies that semester.

Travis does not appear in the TV series. However, Breckin Meyer made a guest appearance in the episode "Do We With Bad Haircuts Not Feel?" as Harrison.

== Sean Holliday ==
(Sean Holland in the TV series)

Murray's best friend Sean was introduced in the TV series. He is a cheerful, if slightly naive, young man interested in rapping and dancing. He is often involved in wacky schemes, many of which he drags Murray into.

Although the character of Sean Holliday does not appear in the film, Sean Holland did, in a much smaller but similar role under the character name Lawrence.

In the television series, Sean is very close friends with Cher. At one point in the episode "Bakersfield Blues," Murray points out to Sean that "If I didn't know better, I'd swear you were sweet on the girl." Sean, however, points out that he and Cher are simply very good friends, and that their relationship is completely platonic.

== Mr. Alphonse Hall ==
(Wallace Shawn in the film and the series)

Mr. Hall is the debate teacher at Bronson Alcott High.

The character's name is listed in the credits of the film as "Mr. Wendell Hall." In the TV series his full name is given as Alphonse Hall. He appeared in only the first season of the TV show.

== Ms. Geist ==
(Twink Caplan in the film and series)

Ms. Geist is another member of the teaching staff. One of Cher's big projects in the film is setting her up romantically with Mr. Hall. Like Mr. Hall, her character appears only in the first season.

In addition to appearing as Ms. Geist, Twink Caplan is also credited as one of the film's producers.

== Coach Stoeger/Millie Diemer ==
(Julie Brown in the film and series)

She is the school's athletics/physical education coach. Her task is to bring the Beverly Hills students into line on the sports field.

In the film, the character's name is Ms. Stoeger. There is a separate (and unseen) teacher referred to as "Diemer," and in the TV series, the coach's character had become Ms. Diemer. No reference to the change of name was made on air.

== Special Guest Stars (TV) ==
(only in the TV series)

- Christopher Daniel Barnes as Donal Miller
- Lamont Bentley as Hakeem Campbell
- Sandra Bernhard as Ms. Sorenson
- Marc Blucas as Doug Sampson
- Linda Cardellini as Oddrey
- Tim Conway as Mr. Hubley
- Jennifer Elise Cox as Felice Lasser
- Loretta Devine as Phyllis Holiday
- Ja'net Dubois as Mrs. Davenport
- Deborah Harmon as Ms. Rebecca Morgan
- Sherman Hemsley as Murray's Grandfather
- Melissa Joan Hart as Sabrina Spellman
- Shar Jackson as Niecy Jackson
- Breckin Meyer as Harrison (uncredited)
- Brittany Murphy as Jasmine
- NSYNC as Themselves
- Taylor Negron as the Hairdresser
- Donna Pescow as Sheila Kendall
- Clive Revill as Mr. Bernie Pimmler
- Brad Rowe as Brian
- Paul Rudd as Sonny
- Gabrielle Union as Lydia
- Jacob Vargas as Ricardo
- Marsha Warfield as Sgt. Meany
- Warren G as Iced Capp

== See also ==
- Emma (novel)#Principal_characters
