= Show Me (Kid Ink song) =

2013 single by Kid Ink

Single by Kid Ink featuring Chris Brown

from the album My Own Lane
- Released: September 17, 2013
- Recorded: 2013
- Genre: Hip hop; R&B; hyphy
- Length: 3:39
- Label: Tha Alumni; 88 Classic; RCA
- Songwriters: Brian Collins; Christian Jones; Chris Brown; Dijon McFarlane; Fred McFarlane; Jeremih Felton; Mikely Adam; Allen George
- Producer: DJ Mustard

Kid Ink singles chronology
"Money and the Power" (2013)	"Show Me" (2013)	"Iz U Down" (2013)

Chris Brown singles chronology
"Sweet Serenade" (2013)	"Show Me" (2013)	"Loyal" (2014)

"Show Me" is a song by American rapper Kid Ink. The song was released on September 17, 2013, by Tha Alumni Music Group, 88 Classic and RCA Records as the lead single from his second studio album, My Own Lane (2014). The song, produced by DJ Mustard and Mike Free, features vocals by American singer Chris Brown. The song peaked at number 13 on the US Billboard Hot 100 and number 23 on the UK Singles Chart.

== Background and composition ==
On September 4, 2013, Kid Ink appeared on Los Angeles' Power 106 to announce his major label debut studio album would be titled, My Own Lane, and premiered the first single titled "Show Me". It was also revealed the song would be released for digital download on September 17, 2013.

The song features a hook and bridge recorded by RCA label-mate Chris Brown, production by DJ Mustard, along with containing an interpolation of Robin S.'s 1993 hit "Show Me Love". The song's production features a bubbling trap instrumental with a slight R&B vibe, along with a booming beat and clapping snares that was described as being tailor-made for the clubs and radio alike.

The song is written in a key of G major.

== Recording ==
Kid Ink wrote and recorded his lyrics over the DJ Mustard production, prior to it being sent to Chris Brown. The song's original refrain was performed by West Coast singer TeeFlii, who also wrote the song's chorus. Ink said, "I know before he had the record that it had a lot of single potential, but it just wasn't where it needed to be. When we linked up with Chris Brown, we played him the record and he kind of understood that. He put that extra... what the record needed to come to life."

The recording session took place from 8PM to 9AM the next morning, and Brown and Kid Ink then recorded four other songs, one of which was included on Brown's X Files mixtape. However, Ink said that none of the other songs would be featured on his debut album. Nonetheless, their collaboration "Main Chick" appeared on My Own Lane.

== Critical reception ==
"Show Me" was met with generally positive reviews from music critics. David Jeffries of AllMusic called it a light, airy and attractive track. Sheldon Pearce writing for XXL called it a clubby infectious hit. Edwin Ortiz of HipHopDX said, "His two collaborations with Chris Brown, "Show Me" and "Main Chick," display early and often Ink's penchant for tailoring melodies for the masses." Brent Faulkner of Starpulse praised Brown's contributions to the song and called it one of the album's best songs. AJ of Uproxx's SmokingSection called it one of the album's standout songs. Grant Jones of RapReviews praised the song's production and called it one of the album's best songs. In February 2014, Complex named it the third best song that DJ Mustard had produced.

In 2023, Robin S. told TMZ that "Show Me" is her personal favorite sampling of "Show Me Love".

== Commercial performance ==
On the week ending October 5, 2013, the song debuted at number 82 on the US Billboard Hot 100. In its tenth week on the US Billboard Hot 100, "Show Me" jumped from number 31 to number 21. By its twelfth week on the chart, the song had reached number 19. That same week, the song peaked at number one of the US Billboard Rhythmic chart. By its twentieth week the song reached a peak of number 13 on the Billboard Hot 100. As of December 2014, the song has sold 1,160,000 copies in the United States.

== Live performances ==
On January 7, 2014, Kid Ink made his late-night television debut performing "Show Me" on Conan with the song's producer DJ Mustard and singer Eric Bellinger replacing Chris Brown. On January 14, 2014, Kid Ink performed "Show Me" again with Bellinger on DJ Skee's SKEE Live. Ink performed the song solo at Power 106's Yesi Ortiz's birthday event at The Belasco Theatre in Los Angeles, California. Then in early April 2014, Ink performed the song, along with "Main Chick" during MtvU's Spring Break 2014.

== Music video ==
On November 7, 2013, the behind the scenes video was released for the music video. On November 12, 2013, the Chris Brown-directed music video was premiered on MTV. The video features cameo appearances from Nyjah Huston, Terry Kennedy, Fuzzy and Stevie Williams. As of October 25, 2020, the music video has over 280 million views on YouTube.

== Remix ==
On February 13, 2014, the official remix of "Show Me" was released, featuring R&B singers Chris Brown and Trey Songz, a new verse from Kid Ink, and rappers Juicy J and 2 Chainz.

== Chart performance ==
=== Weekly charts ===
Chart (2013–2014)	Peak position
Australia (ARIA)	46
Austria (Ö3 Austria Top 40)	47
Belgium (Ultratop 50 Flanders)	29
Belgium (Ultratip Bubbling Under Wallonia)	3
Brazil (ABPD)	43
Canada Hot 100 (Billboard)	67
Denmark (Tracklisten)	33
France (SNEP)	58
Germany (GfK)	36
Netherlands (Dutch Top 40 Tipparade)	7
Netherlands (Single Top 100)	84
New Zealand (Recorded Music NZ)	40
Sweden (Sverigetopplistan)	53
Switzerland (Schweizer Hitparade)	32
UK Singles (Official Charts)	23
UK Hip Hop/R&B (Official Charts)	4
US Billboard Hot 100	13
US Hot R&B/Hip-Hop Songs (Billboard)	4
US R&B/Hip-Hop Airplay (Billboard)	3
US Pop Airplay (Billboard)	21
US Rhythmic Airplay (Billboard)	1

=== Year-end charts ===
Chart (2014)	Position
France (SNEP)	151
US Billboard Hot 100	43
US Hot R&B/Hip-Hop Songs (Billboard)	12
US Hot Rap Songs (Billboard)	6
US Rhythmic (Billboard)	3

=== Certifications ===
Region	Certification	Certified units/sales
Australia (ARIA)	Platinum	70,000^{‡}
Canada (Music Canada)	Platinum	80,000^{‡}
Germany (BVMI)	Gold	150,000^{‡}
New Zealand (RMNZ)	2× Platinum	60,000^{‡}
United Kingdom (BPI)	Platinum	600,000^{‡}
United States (RIAA)	4× Platinum	4,000,000
Streaming
Denmark (IFPI Danmark)	Platinum	2,600,000^{†}
^{‡} Sales+streaming figures based on certification alone.^{†} Streaming-only figures based on certification alone.

== Release history ==
Country	Date	Format	Label
United States	September 17, 2013	Digital download	Tha Alumni Music Group; 88 Classic; RCA Records
United States	October 15, 2013	Rhythmic contemporary radio	Tha Alumni Music Group; 88 Classic; RCA Records
United States	October 21, 2013	Mainstream urban radio	Tha Alumni Music Group; 88 Classic; RCA Records
United States	November 12, 2013	Urban contemporary radio	Tha Alumni Music Group; 88 Classic; RCA Records
United Kingdom	November 18, 2013	Urban contemporary radio	Tha Alumni Music Group; 88 Classic; RCA Records
United States	January 21, 2014	Contemporary hit radio	Tha Alumni Music Group; 88 Classic; RCA Records
