= Black Widow (Iggy Azalea song) =

2014 single Iggy Azalea song featuring Rita Ora

Single by Iggy Azalea featuring Rita Ora

from the album The New Classic
- Released: 8 July 2014
- Recorded: November 2013
- Studio: Los Angeles (Record Plant, Westlake); New York (Jungle City)
- Genre: Pop rap
- Length: 3:30
- Label: Def Jam
- Songwriters: Iggy Azalea; Tor Erik Hermansen; Mikkel Storleer Eriksen; Benjamin Levin; Katy Perry; Sarah Hudson
- Producer: Stargate

Iggy Azalea singles chronology
"No Mediocre" (2014)	"Black Widow" (2014)	"Booty" (2014)

Rita Ora singles chronology
"I Will Never Let You Down" (2014)	"Black Widow" (2014)	"Doing It" (2015)

Music video
- "Black Widow" on YouTube

"Black Widow" is a song by Australian rapper Iggy Azalea featuring British singer Rita Ora. Released through Def Jam Recordings, the song impacted on mainstream radio stations in the US on 8 July 2014, as the fifth single from her debut studio album, The New Classic (2014). It was written by Azalea, Katy Perry, Sarah Hudson, Benny Blanco, and duo Stargate, while the latter also produced the song. Lyrically, it addressed revenge after a failed romantic relationship. An accompanying music video for the song was released on 13 August 2014.

Initially a track recorded by Katy Perry for her fourth studio album, Prism (2013), it was excluded from Prism track listing, and Perry handed the demo to Azalea for her to complete. "Black Widow" has been described as "channeling the Pop" genre, containing an ominous steel drum rhythm, heavy bass and a sparse beat. The song peaked at number three on the US Billboard Hot 100, becoming Azalea's third top-five hit, following "Fancy" and "Problem". The song also became Ora's first top-three hit in the US. It has also reached number one in Bulgaria and Romania, number four in the UK, and number fifteen in Australia.

Its composition has been the subject of music critics' comparisons to Perry's "Dark Horse". Other journalists praised its beat and Azalea and Ora's vocals. "Black Widow" charted due to strong digital sales during the debut week of The New Classic. Accordingly, before becoming a single it achieved peaks of number 91 in the United Kingdom and number 86 in Australia, and appeared on several component charts. Azalea has performed the song live as part of the setlist for her first headlining tour, The New Classic Tour (2014).

== Background ==
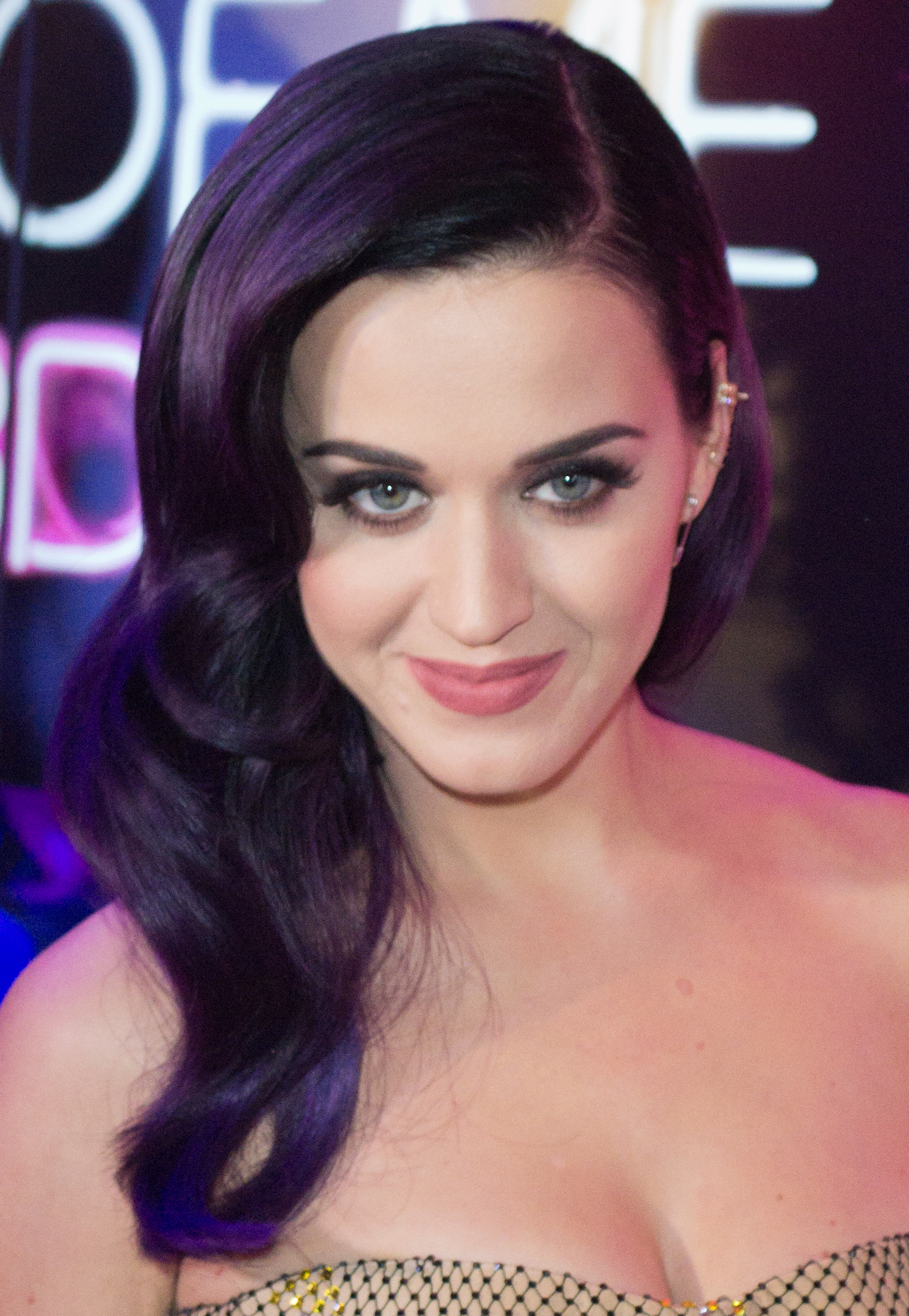
"Black Widow" was initially co-written by Katy Perry (pictured) for her fourth album Prism, but gave it to Azalea after it was completed.

In early 2013, Azalea became friends with American singer Katy Perry through Chris Anokute, an A&R at Azalea's record label Def Jam Recordings. Anokute, who previously was an A&R for Perry at her label Capitol Records, told Azalea that Perry was a fan of her music. When Azalea was nominated at the 2013 MTV Video Music Awards, Anokute asked Perry if she could promote Azalea's nomination in her category for Artist to Watch. Perry then took to Twitter to rave about Azalea's music, and Azalea later consulted Anokute about a future collaboration with Perry. Shortly afterward, Azalea and Perry began working together with the latter's frequent collaborator Dr. Luke, but the collaboration proved unsuccessful. Azalea then heard about a song Perry recorded, "Black Widow", which was going to be given away to another artist. The song was initially written as a last-minute addition to Perry's fourth studio album, Prism (2013), but the composition finalized only after the album's release. Azalea described the track as "a legend" and a "mysterious record" before she could finally hear it.

"I've known Iggy for many years. She supported me on my first tour. It was only an eight show tour in America. She only had 'Pussy' out at that time. I've always loved her vibe and her energy. I knew [her new album] was going to be a shock and it was a good shock, and I'm really happy for her. What we've done together is so cool and 'Black Widow' has an amazing message. We've always wanted to work together and we found the perfect song. It's all about women empowerment." —Rita Ora on collaborating with Azalea on the song.

On 4 June 2013, Azalea confirmed that British recording artist Rita Ora would feature on her debut studio The New Classic, after previously announcing Ora's feature on 26 December 2012. She stated, "I had a song in mind, and I need a woman with a big voice to sing the chorus because I can't do it". Azalea then asked Perry if she could record "Black Widow" for her album, which Perry then agreed to. The record, however, was never sent to Azalea and on 1 August 2013, she denied that Ora would be collaborating with her on the album. Azalea then met Perry for the first time, as her supporting act at the iTunes Festival that year. At the festival, Perry approached Azalea with an offer to record "Black Widow" as she felt the song would suit her better. Azalea was then invited to Perry's after-party that night, where the two exchanged numbers, and Perry sent Azalea the record. When Azalea received the song, it only consisted of a hook and a beat. She initially wanted Perry to sing the song's hook, but Perry was unable to because of time constraints. In an interview, Azalea mentioned, "It needed someone who could really sing, as Katy's voice is awesome. The sky's the limit for Rita. Rita's a superstar and she will only get bigger. Rita is a great fit. Her voice can blow people away." Azalea and Ora then begun recording "Black Widow" in November 2013 after the MTV Europe Music Awards, and completed it in January 2014.

The final version of "Black Widow" was co-written by Azalea, Perry, Sarah Hudson, Benny Blanco, and its producers StarGate. Tim Blacksmith and Danny D. were responsible for the song's executive production and production coordination. StarGate provided the track's instrumentation and programming. Azalea and Ora recorded their vocals for the song at Record Plant and Westlake Recording Studios in Los Angeles, and Jungle City Studios in New York City. Their vocals were engineered by Daniel Zaidenstadt and Eriksen, while Miles Walker was credited as the track's assistant vocal engineer. Phil Tan completed the mixing process at Ninja Club Studios in Atlanta, with the assistance of Daniela Rivera. The song was originally rumoured to be produced by both duo StarGate and Benny Blanco, though upon the release of the album, Blanco was only credited as a songwriter.

== Release ==
On 26 February 2014, in an interview with Los Angeles radio station Power 106, Azalea stated that the album's fifth single would be written by Perry and feature an undisclosed female artist. A 90-second preview of "Black Widow" was released on 11 April 2014. The song's full version then leaked online on 17 April 2014, five days prior to the release of The New Classic on 22 April 2014. In an interview with music website HotNewHipHop on 3 June 2014, Azalea confirmed the song as the forthcoming fifth single from the album. It was released on 14 September 2014 in the United Kingdom.

== Composition ==
"Black Widow"
A sample of the song's chorus introduced with Ora singing the lyrics "I'm gonna love ya, until you hate me / And I'm gonna show ya, what's really crazy".

"Black Widow" is a song which runs for a duration of three minutes and 29 seconds and has been described as a song that "channels more trap music with its beat". The song combines a sparse snap and heavy trap beat with a refrain that follows a slow-building, clapping chorus formula which peaks but deliberately never capitalizes. Instrumentally, "Black Widow" is composed of an ominous steel drum rhythm, and heavy bass, while its dance breakdown is employed with minimalism. Azalea solicits the track's verses with a snarling, bitter technique, consisting of rhyming employed with a spitting delivery. While Ora uses a seething element to sing the track's hook, "I'm gonna love ya, until you hate me / And I'm gonna show ya, what's really crazy / You should've known better, than to mess with me honey / I'm gonna love you, I'm gonna love you / Gonna love you, gonna love you / Like a black widow baby". Combined, Ora and Azalea's vocals are based on a call and response structure throughout the song.

Lyrically, "Black Widow" is a dark love song which deals with the subjects of revenge and feminism in a failed romantic relationship. According to Nedeska Alexis of MTV Buzzworthy, the song "captures the fallout when love turns sour" and is clarified in the lyric "I'm gonna love ya until you hate me / And now I'm gonna show ya what's really crazy". Digital Spy's Emily Mackay denoted the lyrical content in "Black Widow" to contain a theme of "dark, dangerous sexuality" and felt it owned "the bunnyboiler femme fatale stereotype". Nick Aveling of Time Out summarized the track's theme as "boy-baiting drama". The song's beat, hook and production formula garnered many comparisons to Perry's single "Dark Horse" (2013). While Tshepo Mokoena of The Guardian felt "Black Widow" was sonically reminiscent of Azalea's previous collaborations with American disc jockeys Diplo and Steve Aoki, and Craig Mathieson of The Sydney Morning Herald likened the song to the music of Beyoncé.

"Black Widow" is performed in the key of D♯ minor with a tempo of 82 beats per minute. The vocals span from D♯_{4} to B_{4} in the song.

== Critical response ==
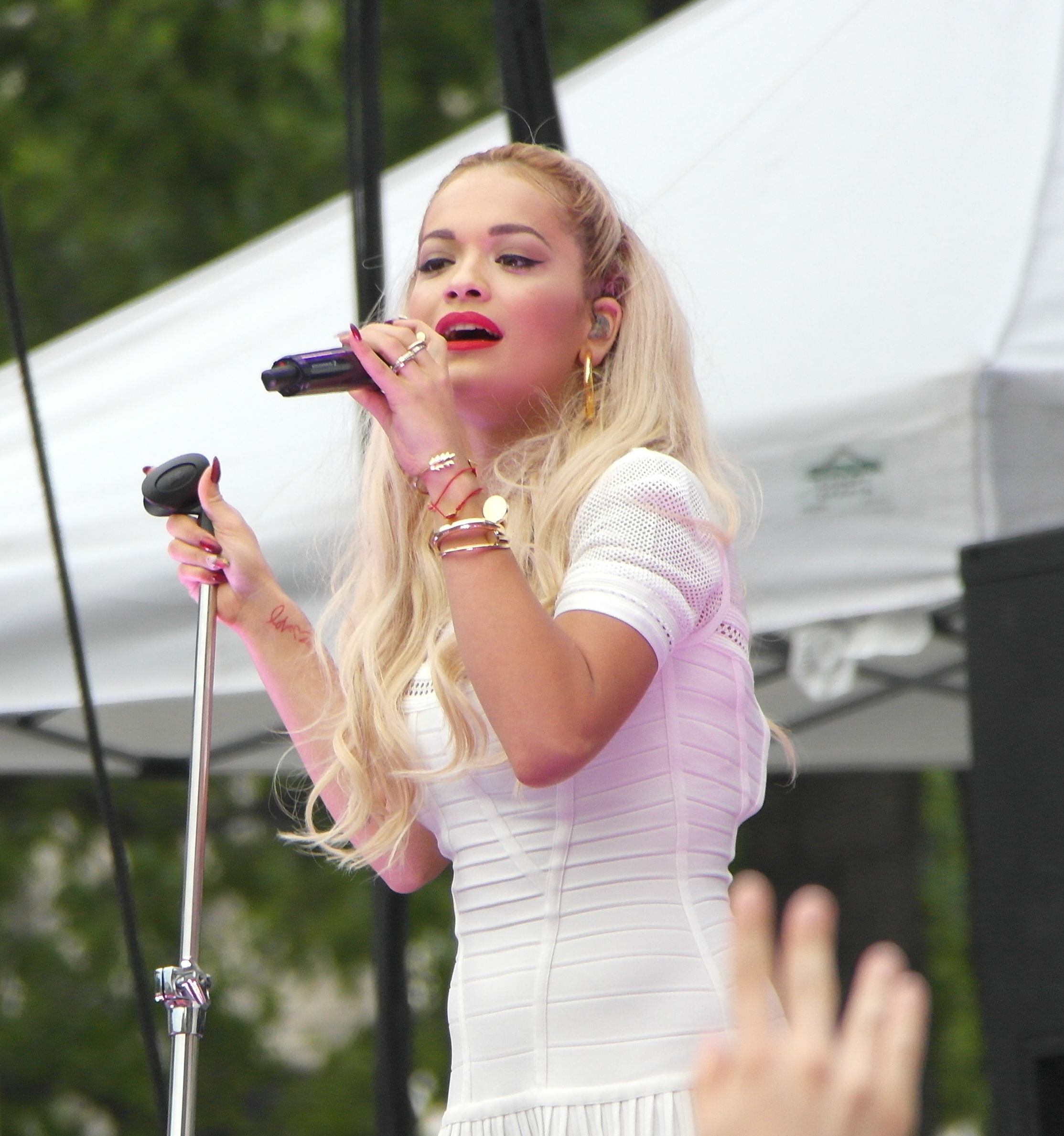
Critical response to Rita Ora's guest vocals was generally positive.

"Black Widow" was met with generally mixed to positive reviews from music critics. Writers for Rap-Up analogized the collaboration between Azalea and Ora as deadly, in the same vein as Azalea's fourth single "Fancy" which featured Charli XCX. The hook was commended for Ora's vocal delivery and enthusiastically described as "hypnotic" and "strong", although Carl Williot felt Ora's hook overshadowed Azalea's verses on the song. Writing for The Sydney Morning Herald, Craig Mathieson stated, "while her verses don't have the sustained length of her previous underground releases, Azalea skillfully upsets convention." Laetitia Wong Wai Yi of Today felt the track attained well-deserved hype and commended it for "perfectly" combining Azalea's vocal fluidity with its minimalistic dance breakdown. Glamour journalist Megan Angelo positively reviewed the song, writing, "'Black Widow' isn't just an excellent get-up, get-ready, get-moving song for Friday night—it also happens to be a Women Killing Music summit in the form of a neat little track."

MTV Buzzworthy's Nedeska Alexis and Saeed Saeed of The National claimed "Black Widow" to be a stand-out track on The New Classic. More negatively, Kellan Miller of XXL found it inferior to the album's prior tracks, his rationale being "Iggy veers off course in an all too contrived effort to meet the quota of her colossal ambition." Exclaim! journalist Erin Lowers wrote, "'Black Widow' should pass the threshold between mediocrity and superstardom, but falls by the wayside with little personality." Drowned in Sound's Giuseppe Zevolli negatively reviewed the song, writing, "'Black Widow' is so preoccupied with its overfilled, catchall crescendo that it oozes away before you even notice".

Although Rory Cashin of Entertainment.ie enjoyed "Black Widow" as a darker-toned "Dark Horse", Gigwise's Alexandra Pollard was critical of the track's similarities, dismissing Perry for repeating her "tried-and-tested-formula". StarGate's involvement was panned by Alfred Soto of Spin, who said the song's hook was borrowed from the duo's previous production for Barbadian recording artist Rihanna's "Hate That I Love You" (2007). Additionally, Soto dismissed the track's synth line as being "nicked" from StarGate's production on American singer-songwriter Ne-Yo's Libra Scale (2010). The song was named the eighth worst song of 2014 by Time magazine.

== Chart performance ==
In Australia, due to strong digital sales during the debut week of The New Classic, "Black Widow" debuted at number 86 on the Australian Singles Chart on 5 May 2014. In Ora's native United Kingdom, the song debuted at number 91 on the UK Singles Chart, eventually peaking at number four on the chart, becoming Azalea's highest-charting single as a lead artist in Britain to date. The song also debuted at number 15 on the UK R&B Chart. In the United States, "Black Widow" debuted at number nine on the Billboard Bubbling Under R&B/Hip-Hop Singles chart issued for 10 May 2014 and entered at number 97 on the Billboard Hot 100 chart issued for 10 July. It debuted at number 36 on the New Zealand Top 40 Singles Chart of 23 June 2014.

On the week ending 17 August 2014, the song advanced 15–8 on the Hot 100 becoming Azalea's third US top 10 hit. The ascent made Azalea the third female act to score three top 10 spots simultaneously in the Hot 100, after Ashanti, Adele and Ariana Grande, with the latter also doing it on the same week as Azalea, marking the first time in Hot 100 history that two acts each tripled up in the chart's top 10 simultaneously. The pair's team-up, "Problem," fell 6-7 (after reaching No. 2 for five weeks) and Azalea's former seven-week No. 1 "Fancy," featuring Charli XCX, slid 3–5. "Black Widow" had sold 2,119,182 copies in the US, as of 28 December 2014, and peaked at number three on the Billboard Hot 100. The song was one of four different songs to be held off from number one by Meghan Trainor's "All About That Bass" and Taylor Swift's "Shake It Off", which held the top two positions for 11 consecutive weeks.

With "Black Widow," Azalea also became just the fourth artist in the Mainstream Top 40 chart history to send her first three chart entries to No. 1, after Lady Gaga, Avril Lavigne and Ace of Base. Ora, meanwhile, earned her first No. 1 on the chart. The track also topped the Rhythmic Songs chart for multiple weeks. On 23 December 2014, "Black Widow" was certified Double Platinum in Canada after peaking at number six on the Canadian Hot 100.

In France, "Black Widow" debuted at number 95, becoming Azalea's highest-debut entry as a lead artist, and so is Ora. One month later, the single entered at top forty, becoming the rapper's fourth top forty and Ora's first. On October 18, 2014, "Black Widow" reached the top ten, peaking at number 9, becoming the two female artists to achieved this. The single spent 30 weeks on the French Singles Chart and became Azalea's second longuest-running single as a lead artist and third overall, and Ora's first until "Lonely Together" with Swedish disc-jockey Avicii, who spent 34 weeks. Besides the success in the French Charts, the song was also in French Airplay, peaking at number 2, and becoming Azalea's third top ten in Airplay of the country after "Problem" and "Fancy", and Ora's very first.

In Finland, the single reached the top five, at number 5, becoming both artists first top five. "Black Widow" spent 11 weeks there.

== Music video ==
=== Background ===
On 3 June 2014, Azalea confirmed an accompanying music video for the song, stating, "We're gonna have a very crazy music video, with a lot of other people that you guys may know, playing different characters. I'm really excited about it." Ora also talked about preparing for the video in June, "It is going to be amazing; I can't even tell you what's going to happen because I am sworn to secrecy. It is going to be major. You've seen her video for 'Fancy'? She loves a theme and the theme for this one is fucking genius. All I am saying is I am in training for days for this video." The video was shot in mid-July in Los Angeles, California. On 8 August 2014 during a performance, Ora announced that the video should premiere officially on 11 August 2014. On 11 August 2014, a 16-second teaser for "Black Widow" was uploaded on Azalea's VEVO channel. The video was directed by Director X and Iggy Azalea and premiered through VEVO on 13 August 2014. Daps was the second unit director for the music video. American actors Michael Madsen, Paul Sorvino, and actor/rapper T.I. also appear in the video. On 14 August 2014, exclusive behind-the-scenes footage from the video set was shown on the second episode of MTV's show House of Style, hosted by Azalea and where she revealed the visuals are inspired by 1970s kung fu films and Quentin Tarantino movies.

=== Synopsis ===
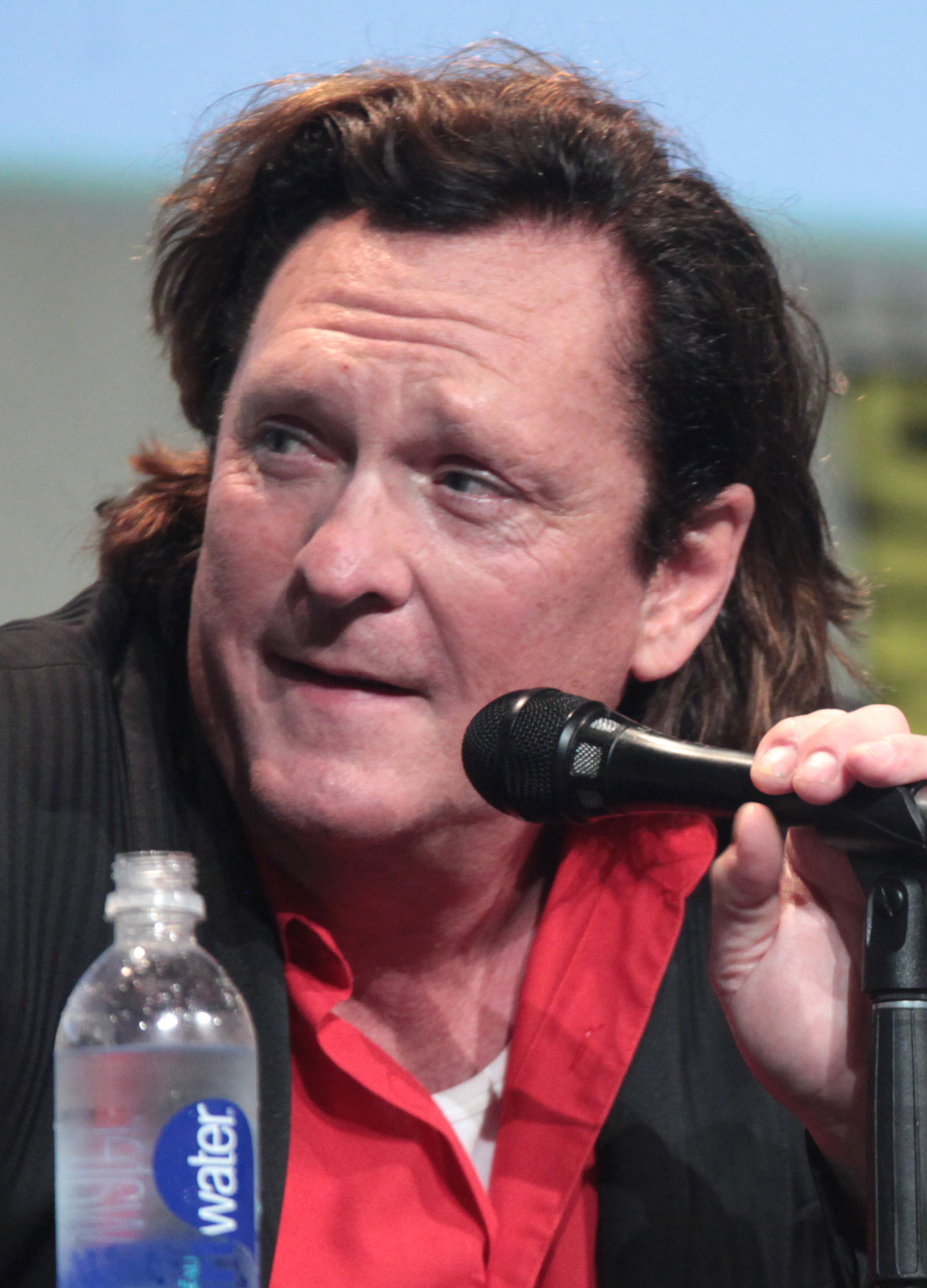
American actor Michael Madsen appears in the music video.

The video starts with Rita Ora and her boyfriend, played by Michael Madsen, entering a diner. The man steps on and squishes a spider with his boot, just before Iggy Azalea is shown as a waitress named Fox behind the diner counter. Azalea then approaches the couple and hands them the menu. The man orders a BLT sandwich "dripping with melted cheese" and just when Ora is about to order, he interrupts her by saying, "She's gonna have the same damn thing", which causes Ora to look at him somewhat upset. As Azalea arrives with the order, the man starts complaining about the sandwich and refuses to eat it. Then, the owner of the diner, Big Wanda, jumps over the counter and asks if there is a problem. After hearing the man's complaint, Azalea tries to explain but to no avail when the owner says "What did the Fox say? Nothing!". The owner then instructed Azalea to make another sandwich but with more cheese. Ora is shocked when the owner begins to flirt with her boyfriend in front of her, and her boyfriend ignores her because the owner promises him a "big, juicy BLT sandwich" that is the menu's special. When Ora tries to speak up, she is verbally put down by the owner, who says her special order is "nothing like the little sandwich" Ora has. Ora continues to show disapproval towards the situation.

The song starts just when Azalea starts chopping the lettuce. Azalea's daydream starts, in which she can be seen with Ora in a snowy scene, both dressed in similar jumpsuits with a "Black Widow" on each of their backs. When the scene changes, Azalea is training with an older Japanese man, followed by her intercepting a poison dart. She opens the dart to find an image of Madsen with the word "Destroy" written on it. Meanwhile, Ora, who is playing poker in an underground casino alongside Paul Sorvino and rapper T.I., wins a large amount of money. Following this, Sorvino becomes upset and aggressive, and Ora kicks him to the ground. As Sorvino lies motionless on the ground, Ora receives a Wickr message with the image of her next target, Madsen. She and Azalea both ride motorcycles to Madsen's club. Azalea unsheathes her katana and strides towards Madsen as the terrified club patrons flee. Madsen summons his guards to attack Azalea but Ora arrives as her backup, and the pair defeat the guards. They then confront Madsen who draws a gun on them, but before he can shoot them, he is bitten by a black widow spider and dies.

The scene snaps back to reality, revealing that all the previous events were a dream sequence of Azalea's, who is actually still chopping lettuce with the owner of the diner yelling at her, saying, "Are you trying to kill my lettuce?".

=== Reception ===
The clip was generally well-received by fans and critics. Brian Anthony Hernandez of Mashable wrote: "Step aside, Uma Thurman. In what could essentially amount to an audition tape for Kill Bill 3, 'Fancy' rapper Iggy Azalea and 'R.I.P.' singer Rita Ora have transformed into beautiful assassins in their elaborate music video for 'Black Widow'." Samantha Nelson of AXS claimed "the video coincides with the female empowerment concept," but was disappointed with the lack of single shots of Azalea rapping and the focus being on the Kill Bill theme rather than the actual performance of the song itself, while Brittney Stephens of PopSugar noted that "Iggy Azalea has already proven that she can pull off the music-video movie spinoff." "Black Widow" was nominated for "Best Video" at the 2014 MTV Europe Music Awards.

== Live performances ==
"Black Widow" was first performed by Azalea and Ora together at Wireless Festival in London on 4 July 2014. The song was also included in the setlist of The New Classic Tour. Azalea and Ora performed the track in spiderweb-inspired catsuits at the 31st annual MTV Video Music Awards, on 24 August 2014. Ora then also joined Azalea's set on stage at the Budweiser Made in America Festival in Los Angeles on 30 August 2014, to perform the song where they had a lesbian kiss to the song. They performed it again together on The Ellen DeGeneres Show's season 12 premiere week on 9 September 2014. Azalea and Ora also performed "Black Widow" in the fourth episode of Saturday Night Live's season 40 on 25 October 2014.

On 17 February 2018, Ora performed the song at the Skanderbeg Square, Pristina, at a concert celebrating the tenth anniversary of the independence of Kosovo, her country of birth. She notably replaced Azalea's verses and the dance breakdown with Albanian traditional music, while her backup dancers interrupted the choreography to perform the Albanian traditional dance, shota.

== Track listing ==
US Remixes EP
No.	Title	Length
1.	"Black Widow (featuring Rita Ora)" (Vice Remix)	3:39
2.	"Black Widow (featuring Rita Ora)" (Justin Prime Remix)	5:41
3.	"Black Widow (featuring Rita Ora)" (Justin Prime Radio Edit)	3:24
4.	"Black Widow (featuring Rita Ora)" (Justin Prime Instrumental)	5:41
5.	"Black Widow (featuring Rita Ora)" (Oliver Twizt Remix)	5:07
6.	"Black Widow (featuring Rita Ora)" (Oliver Twizt Remix Radio Edit)	3:22
7.	"Black Widow (featuring Rita Ora)" (Dank Remix)	4:24
8.	"Black Widow (featuring Rita Ora)" (Dem Slackers Remix)	5:31
9.	"Black Widow (featuring Rita Ora)" (Dem Slackers Remix Radio Edit)	3:17
10.	"Black Widow (featuring Rita Ora)" (Bordertown Remix)	4:35

UK Remixes EP
No.	Title	Length
1.	"Black Widow (featuring Rita Ora)" (Tiga Remix)	5:12
2.	"Black Widow (featuring Rita Ora)" (Darq E Freaker Remix)	3:31
3.	"Black Widow (featuring Rita Ora)" (Mtrnica & Malachi Remix)	3:31
4.	"Black Widow (featuring Rita Ora)" (DJ Turkish Remix)	3:07
5.	"Black Widow (featuring Rita Ora)" (86 Remix)	4:29

== Credits and personnel ==
The credits for "Black Widow" are adapted from the liner notes of The New Classic.

Locations

- Recorded at: Record Plant and Westlake Recording Studios, Los Angeles; Jungle City Studios, New York
- Mixed at: Ninja Club Studios, Atlanta

Personnel

- Songwriting – Amethyst Kelly, Tor Erik Hermansen, Mikkel Storleer Eriksen, Benjamin Levin, Katy Perry, Sarah Hudson
- Production – StarGate
- Vocals – Iggy Azalea, Rita Ora
- Instrumentation – StarGate
- Programming – StarGate
- Vocal engineering – Daniel Zaidenstadt, Mikkel Eriksen
- Vocal engineering assistance – Miles Walker
- Production coordination – Tim Blacksmith, Danny D.
- Executive production – Tim Blacksmith, Danny D.
- Mixing – Phil Tan
- Mixing assistance – Daniela Rivera

== Charts ==
=== Weekly charts ===
Weekly chart performance for "Black Widow"
Chart (2014–2015)	Peak position
Australia (ARIA)	15
Australian Urban (ARIA)	2
Austria (Ö3 Austria Top 40)	25
Belgium (Ultratop 50 Flanders)	12
Belgium (Ultratop 50 Wallonia)	20
Belgium Urban (Ultratop Flanders)	1
Bulgaria (IFPI)	1
Canada Hot 100 (Billboard)	6
Canada CHR/Top 40 (Billboard)	2
Canada Hot AC (Billboard)	28
CIS Airplay (TopHit)	34
Czech Republic Airplay (ČNS IFPI)	19
Czech Republic Singles Digital (ČNS IFPI)	26
Denmark (Tracklisten)	19
Euro Digital Songs (Billboard)	7
Finland (Suomen virallinen lista)	5
France (SNEP)	9
France Airplay (SNEP)	2
Germany (GfK)	39
Germany (Deutsche Black Charts)	12
Greece Digital Songs (Billboard)	9
Ireland (IRMA)	9
Italy (FIMI)	43
Lebanon (Lebanese Top 20)	2
Mexico (Billboard Mexican Airplay)	45
Mexico (Billboard Ingles Airplay)	5
Netherlands (Dutch Top 40)	13
Netherlands (Single Top 100)	13
New Zealand (Recorded Music NZ)	11
Norway (VG-lista)	17
Poland Airplay (ZPAV)	6
Poland Dance (ZPAV)	25
Poland (Video Chart)	2
Romania (Airplay 100)	1
Romania TV Airplay (Media Forest)	1
Russia Airplay (TopHit)	33
Scottish Singles Sales (Official Charts)	9
Slovakia Airplay (ČNS IFPI)	43
Slovakia Singles Digital (ČNS IFPI)	19
Spain (Promusicae)	32
Sweden (Sverigetopplistan)	23
Switzerland (Schweizer Hitparade)	28
UK Singles (Official Charts)	4
UK Hip Hop/R&B (Official Charts)	1
US Billboard Hot 100	3
US Adult Pop Airplay (Billboard)	32
US Dance Club Songs (Billboard)	1
US Hot R&B/Hip-Hop Songs (Billboard)	1
US Hot Rap Songs (Billboard)	1
US Latin Airplay (Billboard)	30
US Pop Airplay (Billboard)	1
US Rhythmic Airplay (Billboard)	1

=== Year-end charts ===
2014 year-end chart performance for "Black Widow"
Chart (2014)	Position
Australia (ARIA)	70
Australian Urban (ARIA)	11
Australian Artist Singles (ARIA)	16
Belgium (Ultratop 50 Flanders)	84
Belgium Urban (Ultratop Flanders)	15
Canada (Canadian Hot 100)	39
Germany (Deutsche Black Charts)	121
Netherlands (Dutch Top 40)	58
Netherlands (Single Top 100)	55
Russia Airplay (Tophit)	186
UK Singles (Official Charts Company)	47
US Billboard Hot 100	26
US Dance Club Songs (Billboard)	21
US Hot R&B/Hip-Hop Songs (Billboard)	6
US Mainstream Top 40 (Billboard)	17
US Rhythmic Songs (Billboard)	13

2015 year-end chart performance for "Black Widow"
Chart (2015)	Position
Australian Urban (ARIA)	39
Belgium Urban (Ultratop Flanders)	36
US Hot Rap Songs (Billboard)	49
US R&B/Hip-Hop Digital Songs (Billboard)	42

== Certifications ==
Certifications and sales for "Black Widow"
Region	Certification	Certified units/sales
Australia (ARIA)	Platinum	70,000^{^}
Brazil (Pro-Música Brasil)	3× Platinum	180,000^{‡}
Canada (Music Canada)	2× Platinum	160,000^{*}
Denmark (IFPI Danmark)	Platinum	60,000^{^}
Germany (BVMI)	Gold	200,000^{‡}
Italy (FIMI)	Platinum	50,000^{‡}
New Zealand (RMNZ)	Platinum	15,000^{*}
Norway (IFPI Norway)	2× Platinum	120,000^{‡}
Spain (Promusicae)	Gold	20,000^{‡}
Sweden (GLF)	2× Platinum	80,000^{‡}
United Kingdom (BPI)	Platinum	600,000^{‡}
United States (RIAA)	5× Platinum	5,000,000^{‡}
Streaming
Denmark (IFPI Danmark)	Platinum	2,600,000^{†}
Spain (Promusicae)	Gold	4,000,000^{†}
^{*} Sales figures based on certification alone.^{^} Shipments figures based on certification alone.^{‡} Sales+streaming figures based on certification alone.^{†} Streaming-only figures based on certification alone.

== Release history ==
Release dates for "Black Widow"
Country	Date	Format	Label
United States	8 July 2014	Mainstream radio	Def Jam
United Kingdom	14 August 2014	Contemporary hit radio	Virgin EMI
United Kingdom	14 September 2014	Digital download	Virgin EMI
Italy	10 October 2014	Radio airplay	Virgin EMI

== See also ==
- List of Airplay 100 number ones of the 2010s
- List of Billboard Hot 100 top-ten singles in 2014
- List of Billboard Mainstream Top 40 number-one songs of 2014
- List of Billboard Dance Club Songs number ones of 2014
- List of number-one R&B/hip-hop songs of 2014 (U.S.)
