= Fancy (Iggy Azalea song) =

2014 single by Iggy Azalea featuring Charli XCX

Single by Iggy Azalea featuring Charli XCX

from the album The New Classic
- Released: 17 February 2014
- Recorded: 2013
- Studio: Grove Studios (London); Conway Studios (Los Angeles)
- Genre: Electro-hop; electropop; pop rap
- Length: 3:19
- Label: Def Jam; Virgin EMI
- Songwriters: Amethyst Kelly; Charlotte Aitchison; George Astasio; Jason Pebworth; Jonathan Christopher Shave; Kurtis McKenzie
- Producers: The Invisible Men; the Arcade

Iggy Azalea singles chronology
"Change Your Life" (2013)	"Fancy" (2014)	"Problem" (2014)

Charli XCX singles chronology
"SuperLove" (2013)	"Fancy" (2014)	"Boom Clap" (2014)

Music video
- "Fancy" on YouTube

"Fancy" is a song by Australian rapper Iggy Azalea featuring British singer Charli XCX, taken from the former's debut studio album, The New Classic (2014). It was released on 17 February 2014 by Def Jam Recordings as the fourth single from the album. "Fancy" is described as a hip house, electropop, and pop rap song. It was written by Azalea and Charli XCX, composed and produced by production team the Invisible Men, alongside additional producer the Arcade. It was leaked under the title "Leave It" in December 2013.

"Fancy" reached number one on the Billboard Hot 100, becoming both Azalea's and Charli XCX's first number-one on that chart. It held the spot for seven consecutive weeks. It also topped the charts in Canada and New Zealand and had general chart success around the world. It reached the top ten in several countries such as Azalea's native country Australia and the United Kingdom. It is Charli XCX's second top-ten single, after her guest spot on Icona Pop's "I Love It" in 2013. "Fancy" was named Billboard's Song of the Summer for 2014, as well as the most-streamed song on Spotify and most-watched music video on Vevo in 2014. It won the Top Rap Song category at the 2015 Billboard Music Awards and was nominated for Record of the Year and Best Pop Duo/Group Performance at the 57th Grammy Awards. It is one of the best-selling singles worldwide and best selling singles from female rapper, with combined sales and track-equivalent streams of 9.1 million units according to IFPI. In 2017, Billboard named "Fancy" as the biggest hit by a female rapper in history. It was the number-one rap song of 2014 in the U.S., taking the top spot on the Billboard Year-End Hot Rap Songs of 2014. It is certified nine-times Platinum in the US as well as Gold or higher in eleven additional countries.

The accompanying music video for "Fancy" was directed by Director X and released on 4 March 2014. The visuals are inspired by the 1995 American comedy film Clueless, with Azalea playing Beverly Hills socialite Cher Horowitz and Charli XCX as Tai Frasier. The music video was nominated for four awards at the 2014 MTV Video Music Awards, although it did not win any of them. The song was performed by Azalea and Charli XCX on Good Morning America, Jimmy Kimmel Live! and the 2014 Billboard Music Awards. "Fancy" was also covered by many artists, such as Anna Kendrick on the 39th season of Saturday Night Live.

== Composition ==
"Fancy"
A 19-second sample of "Fancy", an electro-hop song.

"Fancy" is a three-minute and 19-second electro-hop, electropop, and pop rap song, which was written by Iggy Azalea and Charli XCX. The song was also composed and co-produced by the Invisible Men (Jason Pebworth, George Astasio and Jon Shave) and the Arcade (Kurtis McKenzie). The song is played in the key of C minor without any chord progression followed, and Charli XCX's vocals range from G_{3} to C_{5}. It is in common time and is played at a tempo of 95 beats per minute. The song features stabby synths and repeated hip hop chants of the word 'hey', which bear similarities to DJ Mustard's produced songs. Finger snaps are heard in the original mix.

== Release ==
On 5 December 2013, an unfinished song by Azalea, which surfaced with the title "Leave It", was leaked online. Azalea later revealed the song was produced by the Invisible Men and the Arcade, whom she collaborated with on her entire album. On 5 February 2014, Azalea announced that she would be releasing a new single titled "Fancy", featuring British singer-songwriter Charli XCX, later that week. The song was premiered on BBC Radio 1Xtra the evening of 6 February 2014. After the song's premiere, it was revealed "Fancy" was the song that had leaked titled "Leave It". On 17 February 2014, the song was serviced to urban contemporary radio in the United Kingdom as the album's fourth single.

== Critical reception ==
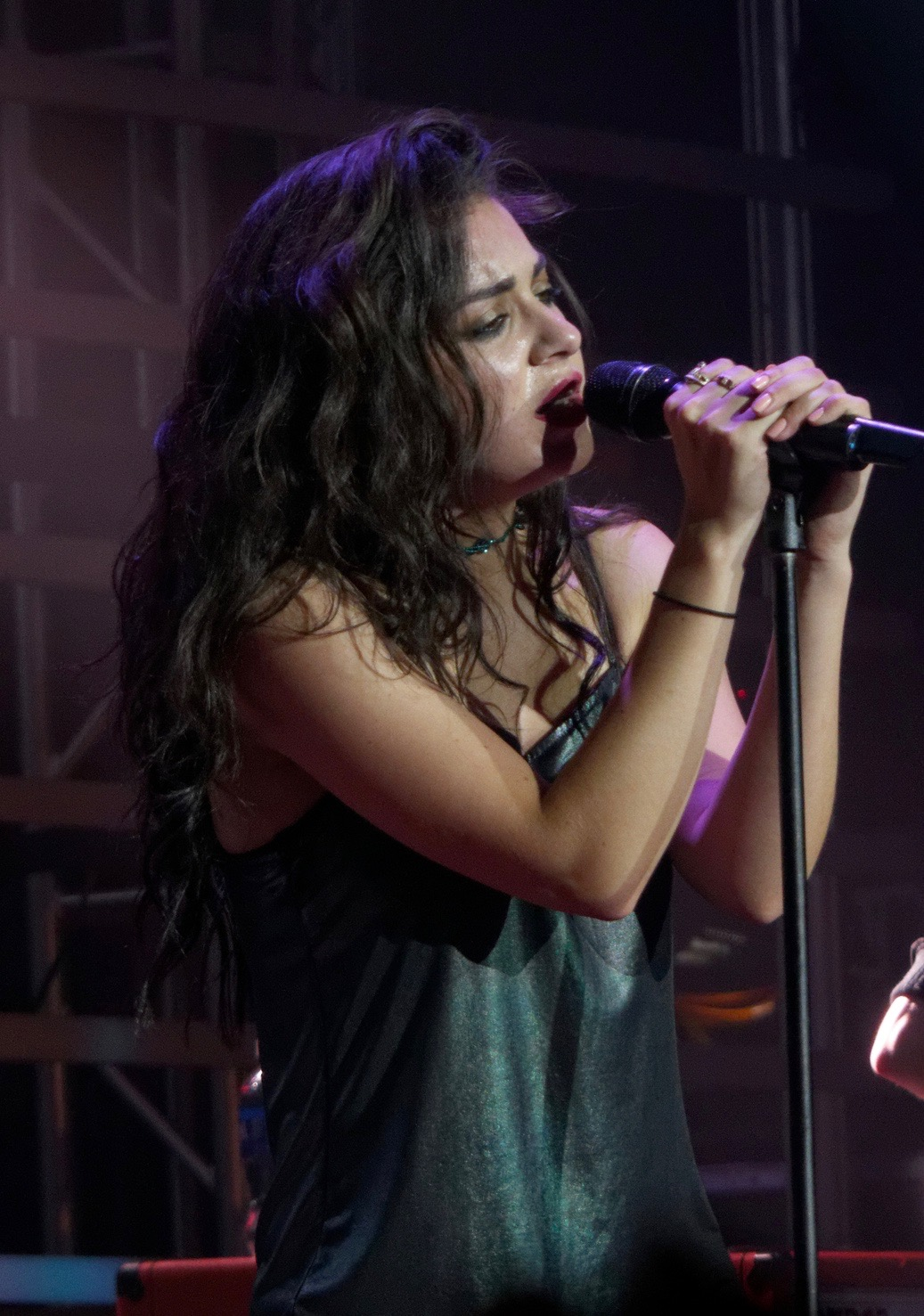
The guest appearance of Charli XCX on "Fancy" was received well by critics.

"Fancy" received overall positive reception from music critics. Brad Stern of MTV Buzzworthy remarked, "Not since Fergie's 'Glamorous' has there been such a spectacularly sass-filled ode to the glam life," praising their chemistry, calling it "a match made in heaven that we never would've expected." Chris Tomas of Hip Hop Wired wrote that the song "could be the hit record Iggy Azalea has been looking for," noting that "Charli XCX also provides a very potent chorus that women will be chanting in their clubs, cars, and the like." Janice Llamoca of HipHopDX defined it as "a hip hop-slash-pop party anthem in which the emcee lyrically displays her confidence."

Joe Gross of Rolling Stone gave the song a mixed score of 3 out of 5 stars, writing that Azalea "deftly handles the ratchet beat while Charli XCX's earworm hook holds it all down," writing that the song "[doesn't] bring '88 back [but] they can swing on chandeliers with the best of them". Jamie Parmenter of Renowned for Sound noted that the song showed the influence of Missy Elliott, and that "Iggy is almost playing a character or parody of herself like Eminem is renowned for," praising Charli XCX for "nicely breaking up the song, sounding like an edgy Gwen Stefani, matching with Iggy's rebel style." Bill Lamb of About.com, like Joe Gross, gave a mixed response, but echoed the same thought as Parmenter, praising "Charli XCX's Gwen Stefani styled vocals on the chorus" and noting that its lyrics has been done even better by Stefani nearly 10 years ago on 'Luxurious'." However, Lamb also stated that the entire song seemed "a bit too recycled" and had a "tiresome obsession with material culture delivered with a straight face." The track was placed at number nineteen on Rolling Stone's 50 Best Songs of 2014 list. It was named iTunes' best song of 2014 on Apple's annual Best-Ofs. "Fancy" was also placed at number one on MTV's Best Songs of 2014. The Village Voice's Pazz & Jop annual critics' poll listed "Fancy" at number 26 on their poll for the best music of 2014, along with Ariana Grande's "Problem", on which Azalea was featured.

== Accolades ==
Awards and nominations for "Fancy"
Organization	Year	Category	Result	Ref.
American Music Awards	2014	Single of the Year	Nominated	
ARIA Music Awards	2014	Song of the Year	Nominated	
BET Hip-Hop Awards	2014	Best Hip-Hop Video	Nominated	
BET Hip-Hop Awards	2014	People's Champ Award	Nominated	
MTV Video Music Awards	2014	Video of the Year	Nominated	
MTV Video Music Awards	2014	Best Pop Video	Nominated	
MTV Video Music Awards	2014	Best Female Video	Nominated	
MTV Video Music Awards	2014	Best Art Direction	Nominated	
Billboard Music Awards	2015	Top Hot 100 Song	Nominated	
Billboard Music Awards	2015	Top Streaming Song	Nominated	
Billboard Music Awards	2015	Top Rap Song	Won	
Grammy Awards	2015	Record of the Year	Nominated	
Grammy Awards	2015	Best Pop Duo/Group Performance	Nominated	
iHeartRadio Music Awards	2015	Best Collaboration	Nominated	

== Chart performance ==
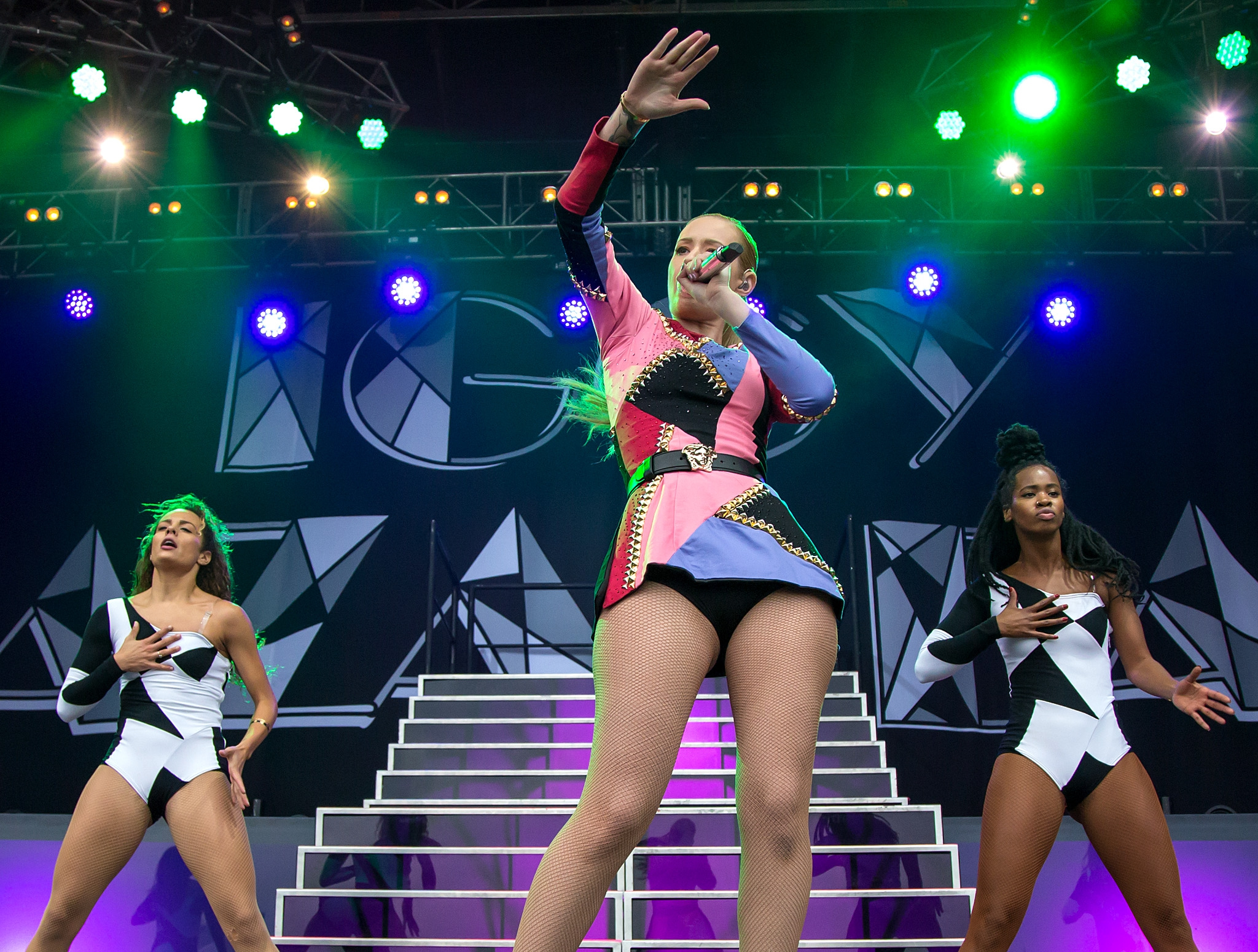
Azalea performing during the ACL Music Festival in November 2014

In the United States, "Fancy" has peaked at number one, becoming Azalea's first song to chart on the top of the Billboard Hot 100. The song is Charli XCX's second top 10 as a featured artist on the Hot 100 (the first being "I Love It") and her first number 1. On the issue date 17 May 2014 "Fancy" reached number two of the Billboard Digital Songs chart, selling 222,000 units, occupying simultaneously the top two slots of the chart as "Problem" by Ariana Grande, in which Azalea featured, debuted at the summit of Digital Songs chart. With this achievement, Azalea became only the sixth artist to occupy the top two position and the first to do so since Taylor Swift with the singles "We Are Never Ever Getting Back Together" and "Ronan" in 2012. Azalea also became just the third female artist to place her first two Hot 100 hits in the top five simultaneously, first two being Ashanti and Mariah Carey. It also marked Azalea as the first female rapper ever to have two songs concurrently in the top five of the Hot 100 chart. Moreover, Azalea passed Lil' Kim as the female rapper with the longest-leading number one on the Billboard Hot 100 and moved into a tie for fifth place among lead women who have scored the longest commands on the Hot 100 during the 2010s. The song led the chart for seven weeks, before being succeeded by MAGIC!'s "Rude". "Fancy" remained in the top ten for 17 consecutive weeks.

On the following week, Azalea became only the second artist in the nearly 10-year history of the Hot Digital Songs chart to have the top two songs concurrently for two weeks and, eventually, for three consecutive weeks. On the week-ending 31 May 2014 the song ascended to number two on the Billboard Hot 100, selling 234,000 units, topped the Streaming Songs chart with 8.4 million impressions and continued to dominate the On-Demand Songs chart for a third week. As it led the Streaming Songs chart for a thirteenth week it tied Miley Cyrus' "Wrecking Ball" for the most weeks tallied at number one. "Fancy" also reached number one on Billboard's Hot R&B/Hip-Hop Songs and Hot Rap Songs, where it remained for 16 and 18 weeks respectively making it the longest running number one on these charts. Additionally, she is the first female Australian artist to top the Hot 100 since Olivia Newton-John reached the summit in 1981 with "Physical". Along with "Problem", Azalea has the distinction of being the first act to have its first two Hot 100-charting singles at numbers one and two at the same time since the Beatles, as "Fancy" and "Problem" did, respectively. She is also only the second female artist to have the top 2 singles for multiple weeks, with the first being Ashanti. Azalea also became the fourth female rapper to top the Mainstream Top 40 chart. The song set new single-week records on Spotify's U.S. streaming service for four consecutive weeks. On 3 September 2014, "Fancy" was named Billboard's top Song of the Summer for 2014 having led their weekly Songs of the Summer chart from start to finish. "Fancy" was also named the most streamed song on Spotify in America in 2014. The song became the fifth best-selling song of 2014 in the United States with 3,970,000 copies sold for the year. By 5 February 2015, the song had sold 4,100,000 copies.

In the United Kingdom, "Fancy" became her highest charting single as a lead artist at the time, debuting at number five on the UK Singles Chart and selling 38,320 copies in its first week. In Australia, the song peaked at number five and has been certified quadruple platinum for sales of over 280,000 copies. In its ninth week on the New Zealand Singles Chart, the song climbed from number three to the top position, giving Azalea her second number-one single there, after Ariana Grande's "Problem", having replaced herself at the top, and first number-one there as a lead artist. It also marks Charli XCX's second top-ten single, after Icona Pop's "I Love It", and first number-one single in New Zealand. It has also been certified double Platinum in New Zealand. The track had sold over 7 million copies worldwide, as of October 2014, making it one of the best-selling singles worldwide. On 23 December 2014, it was certified Triple Platinum in Canada after peaking at number one on the Canadian Hot 100, with 346,000 copies sold digitally throughout 2014. According to the International Federation of the Phonographic Industry (IFPI), "Fancy" achieved combined sales and track-equivalent streams of 9.1 million units in 2014, ranking as the seventh best-selling single of the year.

Worldwidely, the song met a successful acclaim, especially in Europe where the song reached top twenty in several countries, such as Czech Republic, Finland and Ireland, top thirty in Belgium, Sweden, the Netherlands and France, top forty in Denmark, and top fifty in Austria, Switzerland and Slovakia. The song appeared equally in Germany, at number 51, becoming Azalea's first entry there and Charli XCX's second.

== Music video ==
=== Background ===
The music video for the song was shot in February 2014 in Los Angeles and premiered on 4 March 2014, on Vevo. Directed by Director X, the visuals are inspired by the famous 1990s coming-of-age comedy film Clueless, with Azalea playing Beverly Hills socialite Cher Horowitz and Charli XCX as Tai Frasier. The cast also includes a redheaded rival filling in as Amber Mariens, and the brief character appearance of Dionne Davenport and Murray Duvall lookalikes in a remake of the cult classic originally starring Alicia Silverstone, Stacey Dash, Elisa Donovan, Brittany Murphy, Paul Rudd, and Jeremy Sisto. On 4 March, behind the scenes footage for "Fancy" was released shortly before the music video premiere. Over 250 extras were individually styled, taking over two weeks to prepare the styling for the video. The video shoot was the very first time Azalea and Charli XCX met in person. As of 2024, the music video has 1.1 billion views on her YouTube channel.

=== Synopsis ===
The music video for the song shows Azalea (left) with yellow plaid clothing, referencing an outfit worn by the character Cher Horowitz from the 1995 movie Clueless. Walking down the school's hallway with her is an actress playing Dionne Davenport (right), another character from the film.

Many scenes in the video are remakes of key Clueless scenes, with outfits designed to channel the look of the film's clothing, but with a slight update. Like Clueless, the music video for "Fancy" was shot in Los Angeles' Grant High School.

The video opens with Azalea in her wardrobe finding the perfect outfit for a speech at school, using a tablet computer, similar to the protagonist of Clueless Cher Horowitz. After a scene with some cheerleaders, the video moves to the schoolyard; there, Charli XCX and Azalea are sitting at a table, with the former singing the hook. The video later includes a tennis lesson, with Azalea and others dancing close to a chain-link fence. Azalea with two other characters are seen driving in the highway; the characters of the best friend and her boyfriend are inspired by the role of Dionne Davenport and her boyfriend Murray Duvall. The video shifts to a modern version of the Christmas "Val party" from the movie, where the two protagonists arrive with their convertible. The video ends with Azalea and XCX in the school.

=== Reception ===
Chanel Parks of The Huffington Post wrote: "While it might be a little, dare we say it, sacrilegious to replicate this cult classic – we were wondering when there was going to be a music video homage to our favorite movie of all time. So props to you, Iggy." Brent Taalur Ramsey of Paste magazine praised the video, writing that "Azalea combined a quintessential 90s culture moment with her hip-hop vibes [...] this young Aussie brought it all together with some major beats and classic outfits—a sound and look that will be totally trending in the music world of 2014." It was named one of the 24 most iconic fashion moments in music videos by Harper's Bazaar. Amy Heckerling, the director of Clueless, reacted to Azalea and the video in an interview saying, "It looked like they had more money for the video than I had for the movie. But I was extremely flattered and I thought she was amazing." Original actors from the movie including Silverstone, Dash, Donovan and Donald Faison also complimented the homage.

The music video was nominated for four awards at the 2014 MTV Video Music Awards for Video of the Year, Best Female Video, Best Pop Video and Best Art Direction. On 19 June, the music video surpassed the 100 million view benchmark, making it Azalea's first Vevo Certified music video. "Fancy" was named the most-watched music video of 2014 on Vevo in America. It was the most-watched video in 2014 on YouTube in Australia. It has amassed over 1 billion views as of January 2021. Entertainment Weekly named it the best music video of 2014 saying, "A detail-obsessed ode to Clueless—that highway scene! Those knee socks!—that made everybody fall butt-crazy in love with Iggy. The nostalgia trip probably fueled a lot of the popularity of "Fancy," but don't get it twisted: Azalea is a star, and all she needed was the right role to convince the world that was true." In January 2015, Billboard named it the fifth best music video of the 2010s so far.

== Live performances ==
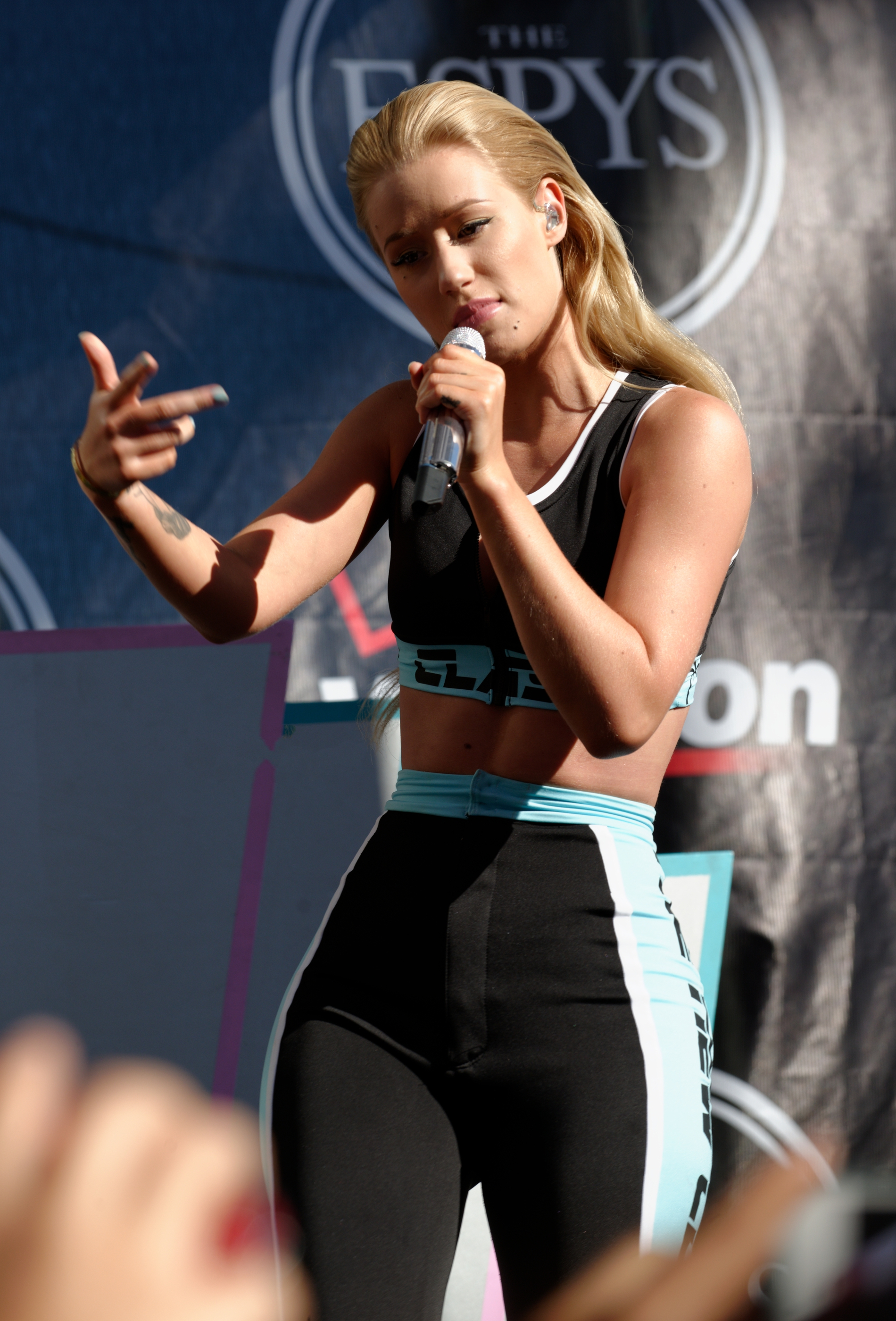
Azalea performing at the 2014 ESPY Awards

"Fancy" was first performed at the mtvU Woodie Awards during the SXSW Festival in Austin on 13 March 2014. Azalea and Charli XCX also performed "Fancy" on Late Night with Seth Meyers on 17 March 2014. On 22 April 2014, the pair recreated the Clueless-inspired video once again during another televised live performance on Good Morning America for the release of Azalea's debut album The New Classic. They performed the song on Jimmy Kimmel Live! on 16 May 2014, at the 2014 Billboard Music Awards on 18 May 2014 and on the season 18 finale of Dancing with the Stars on 20 May 2014. Azalea performed the song alone on the stage of the 2014 BET Awards on 29 June 2014 and at the 2014 ESPY Awards on 16 July 2014.

On 8 August 2014, Azalea performed "Fancy" on The Today Show as part of the Toyota concert series in Rockefeller Center, New York City. The song was also included in the setlist of her 2014 The New Classic Tour of North America and Europe, and also Charli XCX's 2014 Girl Power North America Tour. The track was included on Azalea's medley performances on Saturday Night Live on 25 October 2014, and at the 2014 American Music Awards on 23 November 2014, with XCX joining her on stage for the latter. On 31 December 2014, Azalea and Charli XCX performed the song on Dick Clark's New Year's Rockin' Eve.

== Track listing ==
Digital download
No.	Title	Length
1.	"Fancy (featuring Charli XCX)"	3:19

Digital download
No.	Title	Length
1.	"Fancy (featuring Charli XCX & Wiley)"	3:39

Remix single
No.	Title	Length
1.	"Fancy (featuring Charli XCX)" (Yellow Claw Remix)	3:36

Remixes EP
No.	Title	Length
1.	"Fancy (featuring Charli XCX)" (Riddim Commission Remix)	4:43
2.	"Fancy (featuring Charli XCX)" (Massappeals Remix)	3:42
3.	"Fancy (featuring Charli XCX)" (Dabin & Apashe Remix)	3:55
4.	"Fancy (featuring Charli XCX)" (Instrumental)	3:24

== Credits and personnel ==
Credits adapted from The New Classic liner notes.

Locations

- Recorded at: Grove Studios, London and Conway Studios, Los Angeles
- Mixed at: The Mix Spot, Los Angeles

Personnel

- Songwriting – Iggy Azalea, Charli XCX, George Astasio, Jason Pebworth, Jon Turner, Jon Shave, Kurtis McKenzie
- Production – The Invisible Men, the Arcade
- Vocals – Iggy Azalea, Charli XCX
- Drums and programming – Kurtis Mckenzie, George Astasio, Jon Shave
- Keyboards – Kurtis Mckenzie, Jason Pebworth, Sean Momberger
- Vocal engineering – Eric Weaver
- Mixing – Anthony Kilhoffer
- Mixing assistance – Kyle Ross

== Charts ==
=== Weekly charts ===
Chart (2014–2015)	Peak position
Australia (ARIA)	5
Australian Urban (ARIA)	1
Austria (Ö3 Austria Top 40)	46
Belgium (Ultratip Bubbling Under Flanders)	9
Belgium (Ultratop 50 Wallonia)	25
Belgium Urban (Ultratop Flanders)	10
Brazil (Billboard Brasil Hot 100)	81
Canada Hot 100 (Billboard)	1
Canada CHR/Top 40 (Billboard)	1
Canada Hot AC (Billboard)	18
Czech Republic Airplay (ČNS IFPI)	61
Czech Republic Singles Digital (ČNS IFPI)	11
Denmark (Tracklisten)	36
Euro Digital Song Sales (Billboard)	13
Finland (Suomen virallinen lista)	18
France (SNEP)	21
France Airplay (SNEP)	6
Germany (GfK)	51
Germany (Deutsche Black Charts)	10
Hungary (Stream Top 40)	35
Ireland (IRMA)	12
Israel International Airplay (Media Forest)	14
Japan Hot 100 (Billboard)	94
Mexico Anglo (Monitor Latino)	8
Netherlands (Dutch Top 40)	27
Netherlands (Single Top 100)	29
New Zealand (Recorded Music NZ)	1
Poland (Polish Airplay New)	3
Scottish Singles Sales (Official Charts)	5
Slovakia Airplay (ČNS IFPI)	48
Slovakia Singles Digital (ČNS IFPI)	16
Sweden (Sverigetopplistan)	23
Switzerland (Schweizer Hitparade)	47
UK Singles (Official Charts)	5
UK Hip Hop/R&B (Official Charts)	2
US Billboard Hot 100	1
US Hot R&B/Hip-Hop Songs (Billboard)	1
US Hot Rap Songs (Billboard)	1
US Adult Pop Airplay (Billboard)	21
US Dance Club Songs (Billboard)	1
US Pop Airplay (Billboard)	1
US Rhythmic Airplay (Billboard)	1

=== Year-end charts ===
Chart (2014)	Position
Australia (ARIA)	12
Australian Urban (ARIA)	3
Australian Artist Singles (ARIA)	5
Belgium Urban (Ultratop Flanders)	29
Canada (Canadian Hot 100)	11
France (SNEP)	106
Germany (Deutsche Black Charts)	68
Netherlands (Single Top 100)	71
New Zealand (Recorded Music NZ)	14
Sweden (Sverigetopplistan)	85
UK Singles (Official Charts Company)	31
US Billboard Hot 100	4
US Dance Club Songs (Billboard)	42
US Hot R&B/Hip-Hop Songs (Billboard)	3
US Hot Rap Songs (Billboard)	1
US Mainstream Top 40 (Billboard)	18
US Rhythmic (Billboard)	9

Chart (2015)	Position
Australian Urban (ARIA)	36
US R&B/Hip-Hop Digital Songs (Billboard)	50
US Rap Streaming Songs (Billboard)	25

=== Decade-end charts ===
Chart (2010–2019)	Position
US Billboard Hot 100	62
US Streaming Songs (Billboard)	17
US Top R&B/Hip-Hop Songs	30

=== All-time charts ===
Chart	Position
US Billboard Hot 100	353

== Certifications ==
Region	Certification	Certified units/sales
Australia (ARIA)	4× Platinum	280,000^{^}
Brazil (Pro-Música Brasil)	Diamond	250,000^{‡}
Canada (Music Canada)	4× Platinum	346,000
Germany (BVMI)	Gold	150,000^{‡}
Italy (FIMI)	Platinum	30,000^{‡}
New Zealand (RMNZ)	3× Platinum	90,000^{‡}
Spain (Promusicae)	Gold	20,000^{‡}
Sweden (GLF)	2× Platinum	80,000^{‡}
United Kingdom (BPI)	2× Platinum	1,200,000^{‡}
United States (RIAA)	9× Platinum	9,000,000
Streaming
Denmark (IFPI Danmark)	Platinum	2,600,000^{†}
Spain (Promusicae)	Gold	4,000,000^{†}
Summaries
Worldwide (IFPI)	—	9,100,000
^{^} Shipments figures based on certification alone.^{‡} Sales+streaming figures based on certification alone.^{†} Streaming-only figures based on certification alone.

== Release history ==
Region	Date	Format	Label
United Kingdom	17 February 2014	Urban contemporary radio	Virgin EMI Records
United States	3 March 2014	Digital download	Island Records
Australia	7 March 2014	Digital download	Universal Music
United States	11 March 2014	Rhythmic contemporary radio	Island Records
United Kingdom	6 April 2014	Digital download	Virgin EMI
Italy	6 April 2014	Digital download	Universal Music
Italy	2 May 2014	Contemporary hit radio	Universal Music

== See also ==
- List of best-selling singles in Australia
- List of Billboard Hot 100 number-one singles of 2014
- List of Canadian Hot 100 number-one singles of 2014
- List of number-one dance singles of 2014 (U.S.)
- Handy (song)
