= Believe Me (Lil Wayne song) =

Single by Lil Wayne featuring Drake

from the album Tha Carter V (intended)
- Released: May 6, 2014
- Recorded: 2013
- Genre: Hip hop
- Length: 5:37
- Label: Young Money; Cash Money; Republic
- Songwriters: Dwayne Carter; Aubrey Graham; Anderson Hernandez; Matthew Samuels
- Producers: Vinylz; Boi-1da

Lil Wayne singles chronology
| "Thug Cry" (2014) | "Believe Me" (2014) | "Krazy" (2014) |

Drake singles chronology
| "Trophies" (2014) | "Believe Me" (2014) | "Worst Behavior" (2014) |

"Believe Me" is a song by American rapper Lil Wayne. It was serviced to urban contemporary radio stations on May 6, 2014, in the United States and was released as a digital download on May 28, 2014. The song features a guest appearance by Canadian rapper Drake. It was released as the intended lead single from Wayne's twelfth studio album, Tha Carter V, however the song was omitted from the tracklist upon the album's delayed release in September 2018.

== Background ==
On April 30, 2014, boxer Floyd Mayweather Jr. posted a 15-second snippet/video of the song on Instagram. The preview shows Lil Wayne and Drake in the studio recording "Believe Me".

== Commercial performance ==
As of September 27, 2022, the track has been certified double platinum by the RIAA for sales of 2,000,000 units.

== Critical reception ==
"Believe Me" was featured on XXL's 25 Best Songs of 2014 (So Far). XXL commented on the song: "Carter Season was officially underway when Weezy dropped this gem on us late on a Friday night, and it was worth every second of the wait".

== Charts ==
| Chart (2014) | Peak position |
|---|---|
| Canada Hot 100 (Billboard) | 97 |
| Belgium Urban (Ultratop Flanders) | 36 |
| Germany (Deutsche Black Charts) | 13 |
| UK Singles (Official Charts) | 36 |
| US Billboard Hot 100 | 26 |
| US Hot R&B/Hip-Hop Songs (Billboard) | 7 |
| US Rhythmic Airplay (Billboard) | 4 |

=== Year-end charts ===
| Chart (2014) | Position |
|---|---|
| US Billboard Hot 100 | 89 |
| US Hot R&B/Hip-Hop Songs (Billboard) | 27 |
| US Rhythmic (Billboard) | 22 |

=== Certifications ===
| Region | Certification | Certified units/sales |
|---|---|---|
| United States (RIAA) | 2× Platinum | 2,000,000^{‡} |
^{‡} Sales+streaming figures based on certification alone.
