= List of number-one digital songs of 2014 (U.S.) =

2014 highest-selling digital singles in the United States

The highest-selling digital singles in the United States are ranked in the Hot Digital Songs chart, published by Billboard magazine. The data are compiled by Nielsen SoundScan based on each single's weekly digital sales, which combines sales of different versions of a single for a summarized figure.

== Chart history ==
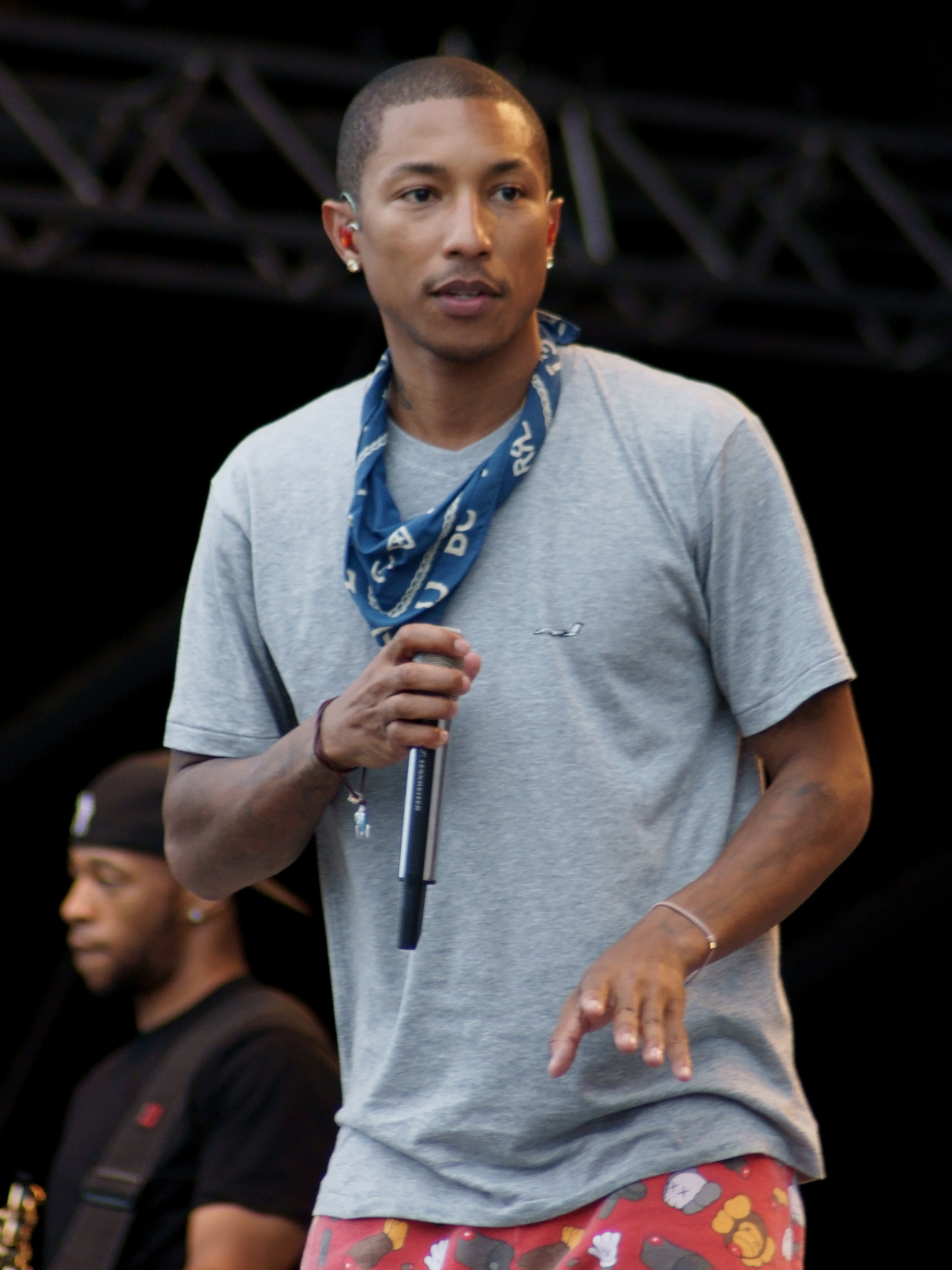
Pharrell Williams' "Happy" spent the longest amount of time atop Digital Songs of any song in 2014, reigning the chart for 11 weeks.

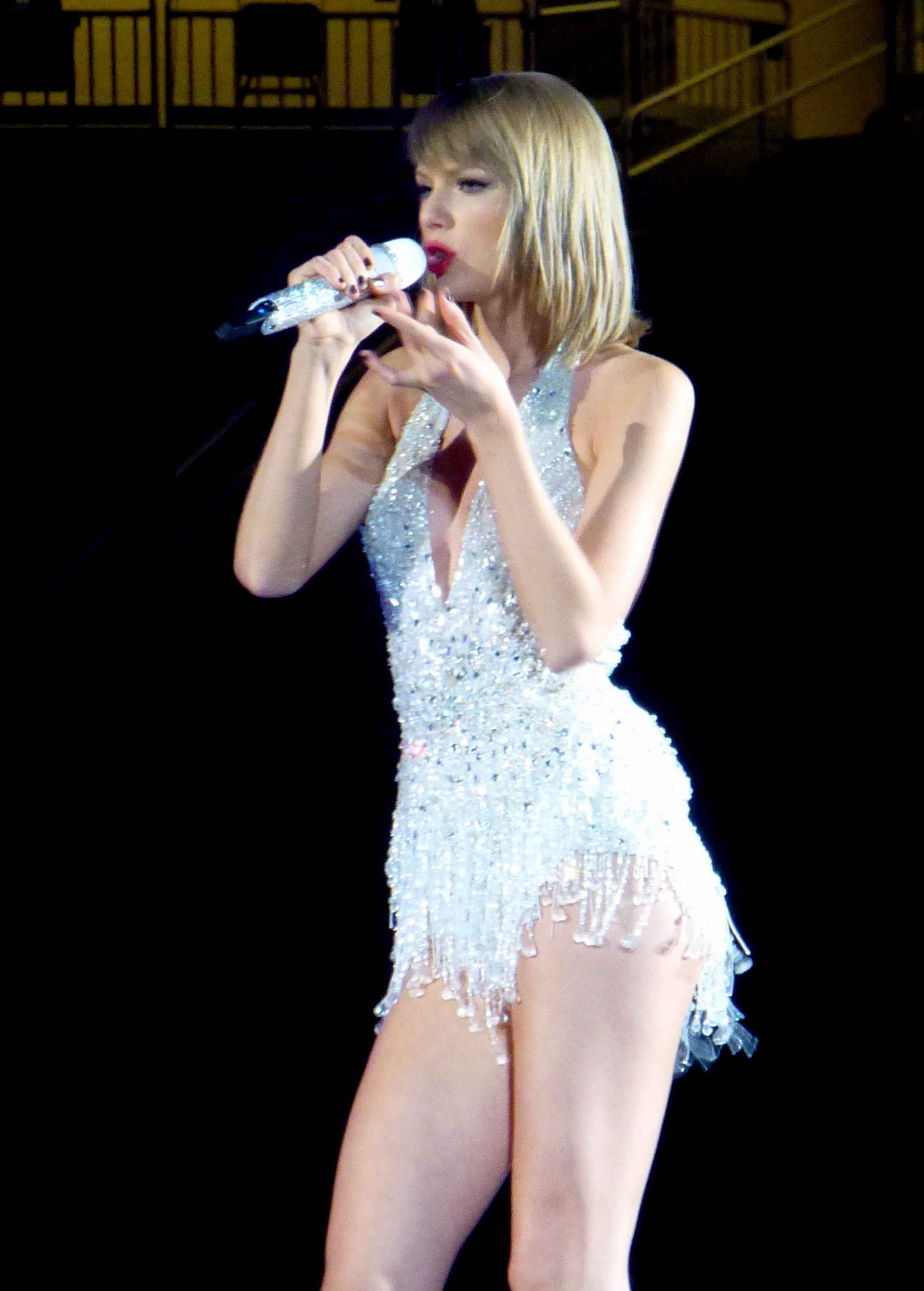
Taylor Swift's "Shake It Off" had the highest digital sales week of 2014, when it debuted with 544,000 downloads sold.

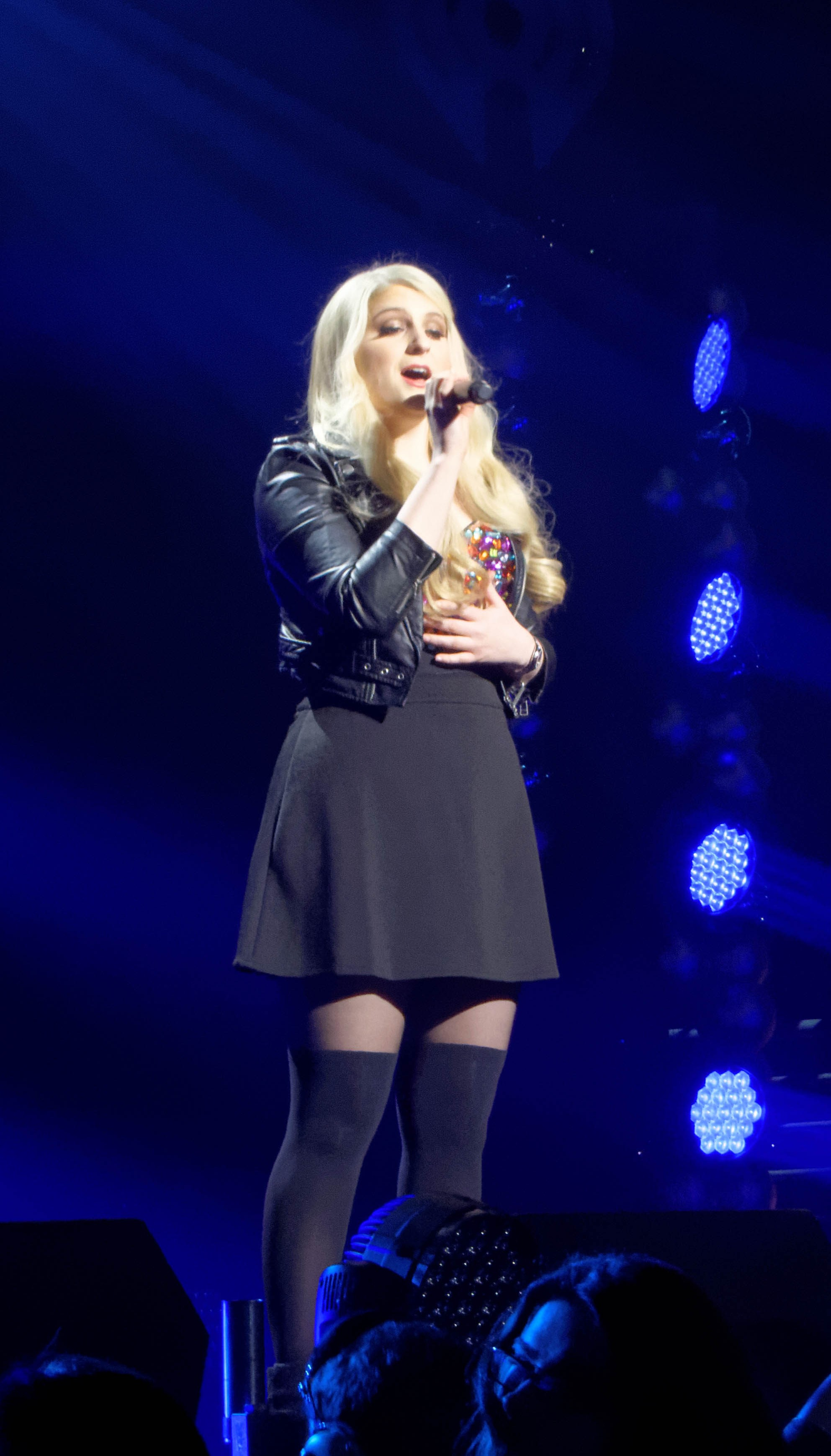
Meghan Trainor received her first Digital Songs number one in 2014, as her debut single "All About That Bass" spent 8 weeks atop the chart.

Key
| † | Indicates best-charting digital song of 2014 |

| Issue date | Song | Artist(s) | Weekly sales | Ref(s) |
|---|---|---|---|---|
| January 4 | "Say Something" | A Great Big World and Christina Aguilera | 238,000 | |
| January 11 | "Timber" | Pitbull featuring Kesha | 442,000 | |
| January 18 | "Timber" | Pitbull featuring Kesha | 301,000 | |
| January 25 | "Dark Horse" | Katy Perry featuring Juicy J | 243,000 | |
| February 1 | "Dark Horse" | Katy Perry featuring Juicy J | 261,000 | |
| February 8 | "Dark Horse" | Katy Perry featuring Juicy J | 294,000 | |
| February 15 | "Dark Horse" | Katy Perry featuring Juicy J | 373,000 | |
| February 22 | "Dark Horse" | Katy Perry featuring Juicy J | 291,000 | |
| March 1 | "Happy" † | Pharrell Williams | 329,000 | |
| March 8 | "Happy" † | Pharrell Williams | 402,000 | |
| March 15 | "Happy" † | Pharrell Williams | 413,000 | |
| March 22 | "Happy" † | Pharrell Williams | 490,000 | |
| March 29 | "Happy" † | Pharrell Williams | 364,000 | |
| April 5 | "Happy" † | Pharrell Williams | 370,000 | |
| April 12 | "Happy" † | Pharrell Williams | 321,000 | |
| April 19 | "Happy" † | Pharrell Williams | 284,000 | |
| April 26 | "Happy" † | Pharrell Williams | 257,000 | |
| May 3 | "Happy" † | Pharrell Williams | 274,000 | |
| May 10 | "Happy" † | Pharrell Williams | 208,000 | |
| May 17 | "Problem" | Ariana Grande featuring Iggy Azalea | 438,000 | |
| May 24 | "Problem" | Ariana Grande featuring Iggy Azalea | 235,000 | |
| May 31 | "Problem" | Ariana Grande featuring Iggy Azalea | 248,000 | |
| June 7 | "Fancy" | Iggy Azalea featuring Charli XCX | 336,000 | |
| June 14 | "Fancy" | Iggy Azalea featuring Charli XCX | 283,000 | |
| June 21 | "Fancy" | Iggy Azalea featuring Charli XCX | 263,000 | |
| June 28 | "Fancy" | Iggy Azalea featuring Charli XCX | 226,000 | |
| July 5 | "Rude" | Magic! | 210,000 | |
| July 12 | "Stay with Me" | Sam Smith | 211,000 | |
| July 19 | "Stay with Me" | Sam Smith | 185,000 | |
| July 26 | "Rude" | Magic! | 185,000 | |
| August 2 | "Rude" | Magic! | 195,000 | |
| August 9 | "Burnin' It Down" | Jason Aldean | 184,000 | |
| August 16 | "Bang Bang" | Jessie J, Ariana Grande and Nicki Minaj | 230,000 | |
| August 23 | "All About That Bass" | Meghan Trainor | 197,000 | |
| August 30 | "All About That Bass" | Meghan Trainor | 239,000 | |
| September 6 | "Shake It Off" | Taylor Swift | 544,000 | |
| September 13 | "Shake It Off" | Taylor Swift | 355,000 | |
| September 20 | "All About That Bass" | Meghan Trainor | 312,000 | |
| September 27 | "All About That Bass" | Meghan Trainor | 312,000 | |
| October 4 | "Shake It Off" | Taylor Swift | 294,000 | |
| October 11 | "All About That Bass" | Meghan Trainor | 253,000 | |
| October 18 | "All About That Bass" | Meghan Trainor | 202,000 | |
| October 25 | "Shake It Off" | Taylor Swift | 171,000 | |
| November 1 | "Out of the Woods" | Taylor Swift | 195,000 | |
| November 8 | "All About That Bass" | Meghan Trainor | 143,000 | |
| November 15 | "Blank Space" | Taylor Swift | 155,000 | |
| November 22 | "All About That Bass" | Meghan Trainor | 190,000 | |
| November 29 | "Blank Space" | Taylor Swift | 328,000 | |
| December 6 | "Blank Space" | Taylor Swift | 302,000 | |
| December 13 | "Blank Space" | Taylor Swift | 342,000 | |
| December 20 | "Blank Space" | Taylor Swift | 254,000 | |
| December 27 | "Blank Space" | Taylor Swift | 249,000 | |

== See also ==
- 2014 in music
- List of Billboard Hot 100 number-one singles of 2014
