= List of Billboard Streaming Songs number ones of 2014 =

This is a list of songs that reached number one on the Billboard magazine Streaming Songs chart in 2014.

== Chart history ==
Key
†	Indicates best-charting streaming song of 2014

Issue date	Song	Artist(s)	Weekly streams
January 4	"The Monster"	Eminem featuring Rihanna	7.6 million
January 11	"Adore You"	Miley Cyrus	7 million
January 18	"Wrecking Ball"	Miley Cyrus	7.6 million
January 25	"Wrecking Ball"	Miley Cyrus	
February 1	"Drunk in Love"	Beyoncé featuring Jay Z	5.5 million
February 8	"Dark Horse" †	Katy Perry featuring Juicy J	5.6 million
February 15	"Drunk in Love"	Beyoncé featuring Jay-Z	9.4 million
February 22	"Drunk in Love"	Beyoncé featuring Jay-Z	6.7 million
March 1	"Drunk in Love"	Beyoncé featuring Jay-Z	7.3 million
March 8	"Dark Horse" †	Katy Perry featuring Juicy J	11.6 million
March 15	"Dark Horse" †	Katy Perry featuring Juicy J	11.2 million
March 22	"Dark Horse" †	Katy Perry featuring Juicy J	8.9 million
March 29	"We Might Be Dead By Tomorrow"	Soko	11.5 million
April 5	"Dark Horse" †	Katy Perry featuring Juicy J	
April 12	"Dark Horse" †	Katy Perry featuring Juicy J	8.8 million
April 19	"Dark Horse" †	Katy Perry featuring Juicy J	8.4 million
April 26	"Dark Horse" †	Katy Perry featuring Juicy J	8.2 million
May 3	"Happy"	Pharrell Williams	9.2 million
May 10	"Happy"	Pharrell Williams	8.4 million
May 17	"Happy"	Pharrell Williams	8.6 million
May 24	"Happy"	Pharrell Williams	9.3 million
May 31	"Fancy"	Iggy Azalea featuring Charli XCX	8.4 million
June 7	"Fancy"	Iggy Azalea featuring Charli XCX	14 million
June 14	"Fancy"	Iggy Azalea featuring Charli XCX	13.5 million
June 21	"Fancy"	Iggy Azalea featuring Charli XCX	12.5 million
June 28	"Fancy"	Iggy Azalea featuring Charli XCX	12.2 million
July 5	"Fancy"	Iggy Azalea featuring Charli XCX	11.6 million
July 12	"Fancy"	Iggy Azalea featuring Charli XCX	11.1 million
July 19	"Fancy"	Iggy Azalea featuring Charli XCX	10.7 million
July 26	"Fancy"	Iggy Azalea featuring Charli XCX	10.6 million
August 2	"Fancy"	Iggy Azalea featuring Charli XCX	12.2 million
August 9	"Fancy"	Iggy Azalea featuring Charli XCX	10.1 million
August 16	"Fancy"	Iggy Azalea featuring Charli XCX	8.6 million
August 23	"Fancy"	Iggy Azalea featuring Charli XCX	8.9 million
August 30	"All About That Bass"	Meghan Trainor	8.1 million
September 6	"Anaconda"	Nicki Minaj	32.1 million
September 13	"Anaconda"	Nicki Minaj	17.3 million
September 20	"Anaconda"	Nicki Minaj	13.1 million
September 27	"All About That Bass"	Meghan Trainor	15.5 million
October 4	"All About That Bass"	Meghan Trainor	15.7 million
October 11	"All About That Bass"	Meghan Trainor	14.3 million
October 18	"All About That Bass"	Meghan Trainor	13.9 million
October 25	"All About That Bass"	Meghan Trainor	13.4 million
November 1	"All About That Bass"	Meghan Trainor	12.9 million
November 8	"All About That Bass"	Meghan Trainor	13.2 million
November 15	"All About That Bass"	Meghan Trainor	11.9 million
November 22	"Shake It Off"	Taylor Swift	16.1 million
November 29	"Blank Space"	Taylor Swift	19.2 million
December 6	"Blank Space"	Taylor Swift	14.2 million
December 13	"Blank Space"	Taylor Swift	14.2 million
December 20	"Blank Space"	Taylor Swift	12 million
December 27	"Blank Space"	Taylor Swift	12.2 million

== See also ==
- 2014 in music
- List of Billboard Hot 100 number-one singles of 2014
