= List of Billboard Hot 100 top-ten singles in 2014 =

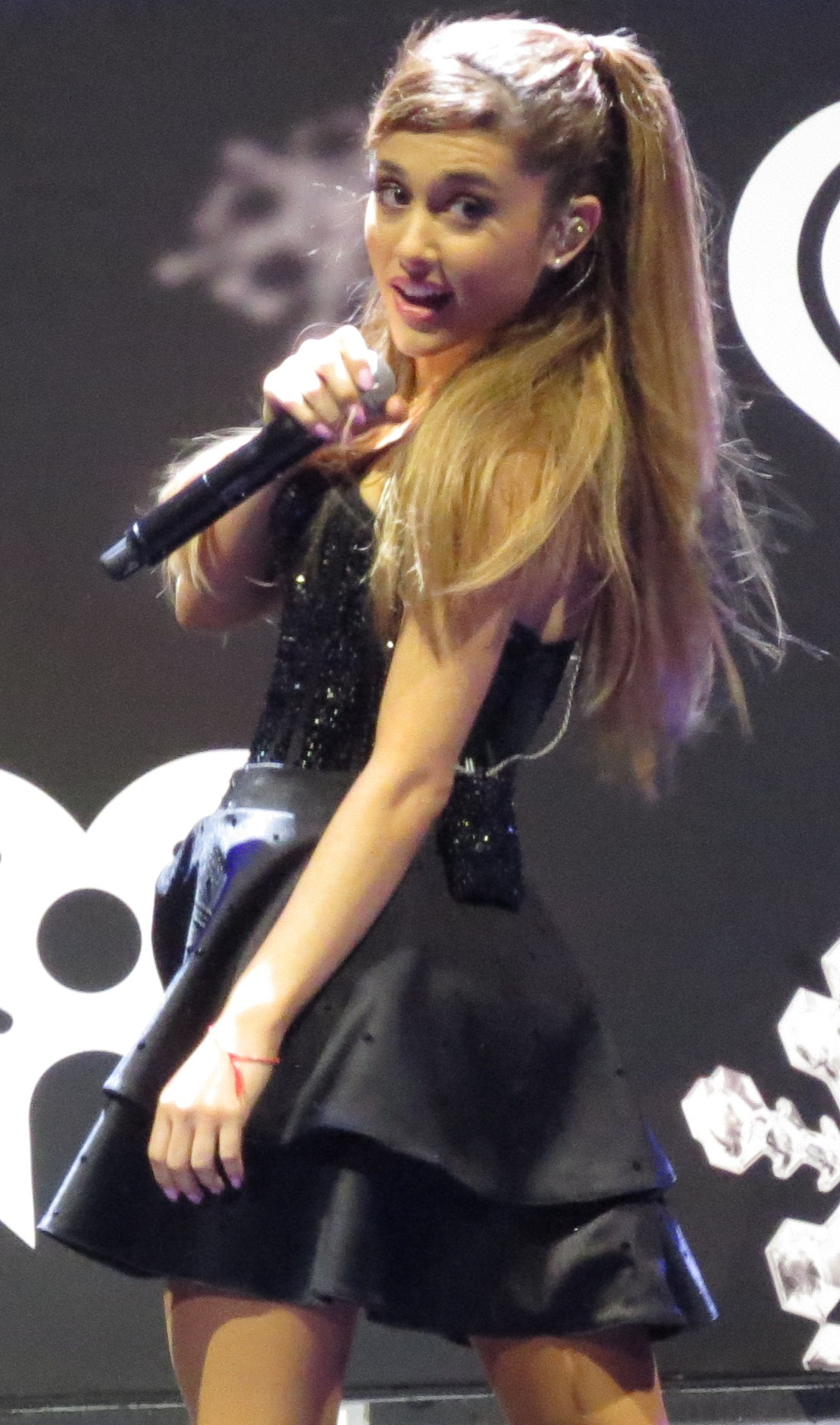
Ariana Grande scored the most top ten hits in 2014 with four, including "Problem", "Bang Bang", "Break Free" and "Love Me Harder".

This is a list of singles that charted in the top ten of the Billboard Hot 100, an all-genre singles chart, in 2014.

During the year, 59 songs (including those who peaked in 2013 and 2015 prior to their entry) and 66 acts charted in the tier, and 28 of these acts scored their first top-ten single in the US either as a lead or featured artist. Ariana Grande had the most top tens in 2014, with four, while Pharrell Willams's single "Happy" became the longest-running number one song in the U.S., spending ten consecutive weeks in the countdown; and OneRepublic's "Counting Stars" and Meghan Trainor's "All About That Bass" became the longest top-ten singles of the year, spending twenty-five consecutive weeks in the tier. John Legend's first top ten hit "All of Me" became the third-longest ascent to number one after Los del Rio's hit song "Macarena" and Lonestar's Amazed, reached on its thirtieth week, and spending twenty-three weeks in the top 10.

== Top-ten singles ==
Key

- ↑ – indicates single's top 10 entry was also its Hot 100 debut
- † – indicates Best performing song of the year
- (#) – 2014 year-end top 10 single position and rank
- The "weeks in top ten" column reflects each song's entire chart life, not just its run during 2014.

List of Billboard Hot 100 top ten singles which peaked in 2014
Top ten entry date	Single	Artist(s)	Peak	Peak date	Weeks in top ten	References
Singles from 2013
November 9	"Counting Stars" (#5)	OneRepublic	2	January 18	25	
November 30	"Timber"	Pitbull featuring Kesha	1	January 18	17	
December 7	"Let Her Go"	Passenger	5	February 22	12	
Singles from 2014
January 18	"Dark Horse" (#2)	Katy Perry featuring Juicy J	1	February 8	22	
February 1	"Pompeii"^{[D]}	Bastille	5	March 15	15	
February 1	"Team"	Lorde	6	March 15	14	
February 8	"Talk Dirty" (#6)	Jason Derulo featuring 2 Chainz	3	February 22	18	
February 15	"Drunk in Love"	Beyoncé featuring Jay Z	2	February 15	8	
February 15	"Happy" † (#1)	Pharrell Williams	1	March 8	22	
March 8	"All of Me" (#3)	John Legend	1	May 17	23	
March 22	"Let It Go"^{[E]}	Idina Menzel	5	April 5	9	
March 29	"We Might Be Dead by Tomorrow" ↑	Soko	9	March 29	1	
March 29	"The Man"	Aloe Blacc	8	April 12	5	
April 12	"Turn Down for What"	DJ Snake and Lil Jon	4	June 14	15	
May 3	"Loyal"	Chris Brown featuring Lil Wayne and French Montana or Too Short or Tyga	9	May 3	2	
May 3	"Not a Bad Thing"	Justin Timberlake	8	May 3	6	
May 10	"Fancy" (#4)	Iggy Azalea featuring Charli XCX	1	June 7	17	
May 17	"Problem" (#9) ↑	Ariana Grande featuring Iggy Azalea	2	June 7	16	
May 24	"Ain't It Fun"	Paramore	10	May 24	1	
May 31	"Love Never Felt So Good"	Michael Jackson and Justin Timberlake	9	May 31	1	
May 31	"A Sky Full of Stars"	Coldplay	10	May 31	1	
June 7	"Am I Wrong"	Nico & Vinz	4	July 5	14	
June 7	"Wiggle"	Jason Derulo featuring Snoop Dogg	5	June 21	9	
June 14	"Rude" (#7)	Magic!	1	July 26	16	
June 14	"Summer"	Calvin Harris	7	July 19	9	
June 21	"Stay With Me"(#10)	Sam Smith	2	August 16	21	
July 19	"Maps"^{[G]}	Maroon 5	6	August 9	8	
July 26	"Latch"	Disclosure featuring Sam Smith	7	August 9	4	
August 9	"Chandelier"^{[I]}	Sia	8	August 23	8	
August 16	"Bang Bang" ↑	Jessie J, Ariana Grande and Nicki Minaj	3	October 4	16	
August 16	"All About That Bass" (#8)	Meghan Trainor	1	September 20	25	
August 23	"Boom Clap"^{[F]} ^{[H]}	Charli XCX	8	October 4	4	
August 30	"Black Widow"	Iggy Azalea featuring Rita Ora	3	October 18	13	
August 30	"Break Free"	Ariana Grande featuring Zedd	4	August 30	8	
September 6	"Shake It Off" ↑	Taylor Swift	1	September 6	24	
September 6	"Anaconda"	Nicki Minaj	2	September 6	8	
October 4	"Don't Tell 'Em"	Jeremih featuring YG	6	October 25	8	
October 11	"Habits (Stay High)"	Tove Lo	3	November 8	10	
October 11	"Rather Be"	Clean Bandit featuring Jess Glynne	10	October 11	1	
October 18	"Animals"	Maroon 5	3	November 22	14	
October 25	"Hot Boy"	Bobby Shmurda	6	November 22	6	
November 1	"Don't"^{[J]} ^{[K]}	Ed Sheeran	9	November 15	3	
November 8	"Take Me to Church"	Hozier	2	December 20	20	
November 22	"Love Me Harder"^{[K]}	Ariana Grande and The Weeknd	7	November 22	7	
November 29	"Blank Space"	Taylor Swift	1	November 29	17	
November 29	"I'm Not the Only One"	Sam Smith	5	December 27	14	
December 13	"The Heart Wants What It Wants"	Selena Gomez	6	December 13	1	
December 20	"Lips Are Movin"	Meghan Trainor	4	December 27	12	

=== 2013 peaks ===
List of Billboard Hot 100 top ten singles in 2014 which peaked in 2013
Top ten entry date	Single	Artist(s)	Peak	Peak date	Weeks in top ten	References
August 31	"Roar"^{[A]}	Katy Perry	1	September 14	17	
September 7	"Wake Me Up!"	Avicii	4	October 5	21	
September 14	"Royals"	Lorde	1	October 12	23	
September 28	"Wrecking Ball"^{[B]}	Miley Cyrus	1	September 28	16	
November 9	"Demons"	Imagine Dragons	6	December 7	12	
November 16	"The Monster" ↑	Eminem featuring Rihanna	1	December 21	13	
November 16	"Story of My Life" ↑^{[C]}	One Direction	6	November 16	7	
December 14	"Say Something"	A Great Big World and Christina Aguilera	4	December 28	14	

=== 2015 peaks ===
List of Billboard Hot 100 top ten singles in 2014 which peaked in 2015
Top ten entry date	Single	Artist(s)	Peak	Peak date	Weeks in top ten	References
November 29	"Jealous"^{[L]}	Nick Jonas	7	January 24	10	
December 13	"Uptown Funk"	Mark Ronson featuring Bruno Mars	1	January 17	31	
December 27	"Thinking Out Loud"	Ed Sheeran	2	January 31	23	

== Artists with most top-ten songs ==
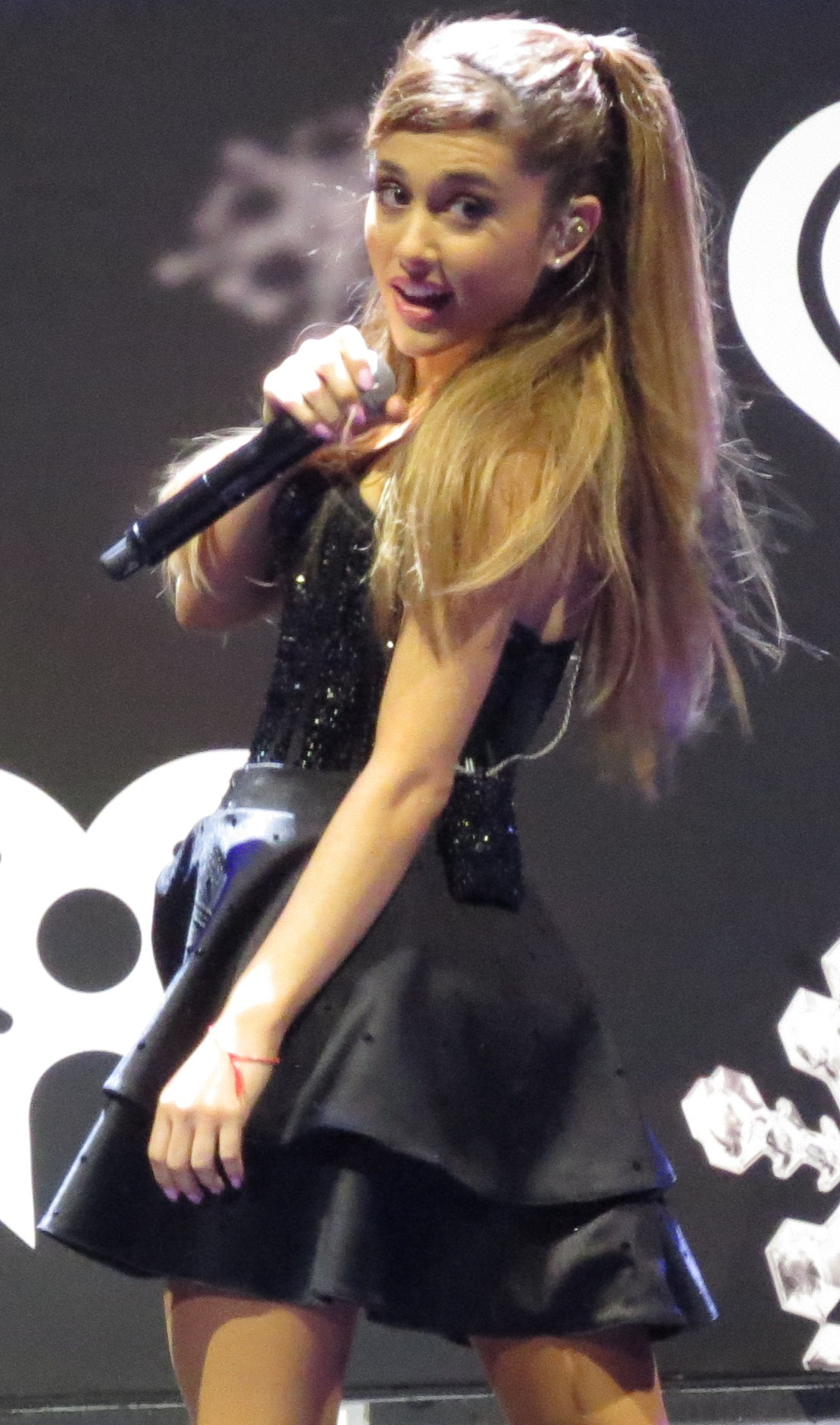
Ariana Grande scored the most top ten hits in 2014 with four, including "Problem", "Bang Bang", "Break Free" and "Love Me Harder".

List of artists by total songs peaking in the top-ten
Artist	Numbers of songs
Ariana Grande	4
Iggy Azalea	3
Sam Smith	3
Charli XCX	2
Ed Sheeran	2
Jason Derulo	2
Justin Timberlake	2
Maroon 5	2
Meghan Trainor	2
Nicki Minaj	2

== Notes ==
^{A} The single re-entered the top ten on the week ending January 11, 2014.
^{B} The single re-entered the top ten on the week ending January 18, 2014.
^{C} The single re-entered the top ten on the week ending January 25, 2014.
^{D} The single re-entered the top ten on the week ending February 22, 2014.
^{E} The single re-entered the top ten on the week ending April 5, 2014.
^{F} The single re-entered the top ten on the week ending September 13, 2014.
^{G} The single re-entered the top ten on the week ending September 20, 2014.
^{H} The single re-entered the top ten on the week ending September 27, 2014.
^{I} The single re-entered the top ten on the week ending October 4, 2014.
^{J} The single re-entered the top ten on the week ending November 15, 2014.
^{K} The single re-entered the top ten on the week ending December 6, 2014.
^{L} The single re-entered the top ten on the week ending December 20, 2014.

== See also ==
- 2014 in American music
- List of Billboard Hot 100 number ones of 2014
- Billboard Year-End Hot 100 singles of 2014
