= Out of the Woods =

2016 single by Taylor Swift

Single by Taylor Swift

from the album 1989
- Released: January 19, 2016
- Studio: Conway Recording, Los Angeles; Jungle City, New York City
- Genre: Synth-pop
- Length: 3:55
- Label: Big Machine
- Songwriters: Taylor Swift; Jack Antonoff
- Producers: Taylor Swift; Jack Antonoff

Taylor Swift singles chronology
"Wildest Dreams" (2015)	"Out of the Woods" (2016)	"New Romantics" (2016)

Music video
- "Out of the Woods" on YouTube

"Out of the Woods" is a song by the American singer-songwriter Taylor Swift from her fifth studio album, 1989 (2014). Swift wrote and produced the song with Jack Antonoff. With lyrics inspired by a failed relationship and the ensuing anxieties that Swift experienced, "Out of the Woods" is a synth-pop song with elements of Eurodance and indietronica and features heavy synthesizers, looping drums, and layered background vocals.

Big Machine Records made the song available for download on October 14, 2014, as a promotional single for 1989. Swift premiered the music video for "Out of the Woods" on ABC's Dick Clark's New Year's Rockin' Eve on December 31, 2015; the video depicts Swift struggling to escape from a magical forest. The song was released to US pop and hot adult contemporary radio as the album's sixth single on January 19, 2016, by Big Machine in partnership with Republic Records.

Music critics praised "Out of the Woods" for its 1980s-influenced production and narrative lyrics offering emotional engagement. The song peaked at number 18 on the US Billboard Hot 100 and was certified platinum by the Recording Industry Association of America (RIAA). It also reached the top 10 of charts in Canada and New Zealand. Swift performed the song on television shows such as Good Morning America and included it in the set list of the 1989 World Tour (2015). Following the 2019 dispute regarding the ownership of Swift's back catalog, she re-recorded the song as "Out of the Woods (Taylor's Version)" for her re-recorded album 1989 (Taylor's Version) (2023).

== Background and production ==
Taylor Swift had been identified as a country singer-songwriter up until her fourth studio album, Red, which was released in October 2012. Red incorporates various pop and rock styles, transcending the country sound of her previous releases. Swift began writing her fifth studio album, 1989, in mid-2013, when she was on the Red Tour. Inspired by 1980s synth-pop, she conceived 1989 as her first "official pop album" that transformed her image from country to pop. On 1989, Swift enlisted new producers including Jack Antonoff, who produced two songs with Swift for the standard edition—"Out of the Woods" and "I Wish You Would", and the bonus track "You Are in Love" for the deluxe edition; Antonoff had worked with Swift on "Sweeter than Fiction", a 1980s new wave-influenced song recorded by Swift for the soundtrack of One Chance (2013).

For "Out of the Woods," Antonoff envisioned the song to feature a 1980s sound with a modern twist. He used a Yamaha DX7 synthesizer to create most parts of the song, and a Minimoog Voyager for the refrain, which brought forth an "extremely modern" sound that he desired. He edited his background vocals and layered them over looping drums. After completing the instrumental, Antonoff sent it to Swift when she was on a plane. Swift sent him a voice memo containing the lyrics roughly 30 minutes later; it was the first time Swift wrote the lyrics to an existing track. According to the liner notes of 1989, "Out of the Woods" was recorded by Laura Sisk, assisted by Brendan Morawski, at Jungle City Studios in New York City, and by Sam Holland, assisted by Cory Bice, at Conway Recording Studios in Los Angeles. Swift's vocals were produced by Max Martin.

== Music and lyrics ==
"Out of the Woods"
A sample of the song's bridge with looping drums, "oh-oh" background vocals, and lyrics referencing a snowmobile accident that Swift and an ex-lover encountered.

Music critics described "Out of the Woods" as a 1980s-influenced synth-pop song. According to Hannah Mylrea from NME and Edwin Mcfee from Hot Press, the track consists of indietronica and Eurodance elements. The production is characterized by pulsing synthesizers, loud drums, and echoing background vocals that gradually build up towards the end. Compared to other tracks of 1989, "Out of the Woods" features a denser production. Antonoff took inspiration from the music of the rock band My Morning Jacket: "every sound is louder than the last ... It started out big, and then I think the obvious move would have been to do a down chorus, but the idea was to keep pushing."

The lyrics are about a fragile romance, inspired by the anxieties Swift experienced from a tumultuous relationship. In the refrain, Swift repeats the line, "Are we out of the woods yet?" over and over, indicating her desire to stabilize the relationship. Swift ponders over its inevitable end: "Your necklace hanging from my neck the night we couldn't quite forget / When we decided to move the furniture so we could dance / Baby, like we stood a chance." The bridge narrates an accident that requires one of the couple to undergo a surgery: "Remember when you hit the brakes too soon / Twenty stitches in a hospital room." The accident in the bridge was inspired by a snowmobile accident that she and an ex-lover had suffered when they were on a ski trip; she had persuaded the tabloid media to not publicize it. Besides its literal sense, the accident is a metaphor for the relationship's fragility and how the two have to deal with its aftermath. When promoting 1989 in October 2014, Swift remarked that "Out of the Woods" was the song that "best represents [the album]".

== Release and commercial performance ==
On October 13, 2014, Swift premiered 15 seconds of "Out of the Woods" on Good Morning America. Big Machine Records made the song available for download on October 14, 2014, as a promotional single for 1989. It is track number four on 1989, which was released on October 27, 2014, by Big Machine.

Swift premiered the music video for "Out of the Woods" on Dick Clark's New Year's Rockin' Eve, broadcast on December 31, 2015. Big Machine and Republic Records released the song to US pop and hot adult contemporary radio stations on January 19, 2016; it was the sixth single from 1989. In Italy, "Out of the Woods" was released to radio on February 5, 2016, by Universal Music Group.

"Out of the Woods" entered the US Billboard Hot 100 chart dated November 1, 2014, at number 18, its peak position. It entered the Billboard Digital Songs at number one, becoming Swift's eighth chart topper. After its video premiere on New Year's Rockin' Eve, the song re-appeared on the Hot 100 at number 46. By May 2016, the Recording Industry Association of America (RIAA) had certified it platinum for one million units based on digital sales and streaming. The single peaked within the top 10 on charts of New Zealand (number six) and Canada (number eight). In Australia, the song peaked at number 19 on the singles chart and was certified triple-platinum by the Australian Recording Industry Association (ARIA). The track was certified gold by the British Phonographic Industry (BPI) and platinum by the International Federation of the Phonographic Industry (IFPI) in Norway.

== Critical reception ==
The song received critical acclaim. Upon the release of 1989, music critics compared the 1980s-influenced production of "Out of the Woods" to the music of 1980s musicians including Phil Collins and Madonna. Sam Lansky from Time, Jason Lipshutz from Billboard, Brian Mansfield from USA Today, and Lindsay Zoladz from Vulture praised the production for showcasing Swift's expanding artistry beyond her previous country styles. In a review of 1989 for the Los Angeles Times, Mikael Wood deemed "Out of the Woods" one of the album's highlights, describing it as the most authentic tribute to the 1980s synth-pop sound that Swift tried to recreate on the album.

Other reviews complimented Swift's lyrical craftsmanship and storytelling, which she had honed on her previous country songs. Lipshutz remarked that although the song was a musical departure for Swift, it was a reminder of her abilities to present "striking, instantly unforgettable images". Writing for The Independent, Andy Gill argued that the intricate lyrics capturing "dramatic emotional change in a few striking lines" of "Out of the Woods" were rare for a pop song. Carl Wilson, in a 1989 review for Slate, picked it as his favorite off the album, highlighting both the detailed lyrics and the production. Esther Zuckerman of Entertainment Weekly deemed the production generic, but highlighted the lyrics as a testament to Swift's ability to offer emotional engagement in her songs.

"Out of the Woods" ranked at number 94 on Pitchfork's list of the 100 Best Tracks of 2014. In retrospective reviews, Mylrea and Nate Jones from Vulture complimented the song's production and emotional sentiments, but Rob Sheffield from Rolling Stone was less enthusiastic, feeling that the production overwhelms the intricate lyrics. NME, honoring Antonoff with the Songwriter Award in 2022, selected "Out of the Woods" as one of his best songs.

== Music video ==
Joseph Kahn directed the music video for "Out of the Woods". The video's filming locations in New Zealand included Bethells Beach and the mountains of Queenstown. During the filming, a severe storm struck, causing a one-week delay. Conservationists in the area claimed that the production team breached their permit and endangered a rare native bird by using up to 12 vehicles, an accusation that Swift's crew denied.

The video shows Swift battling to get out of a forest, interpreting the title literally. Swift is seen struggling to escape a magical forest while being chased by a pack of wolves as animate roots constantly follow her. She then finds herself in different natural settings like snowy mountains, an ocean, a barren landscape, a muddy location, and a burning forest. At the end of the video, the woods disappear as she finds a beach, where another version of her is standing by the shore as she reaches for her. The video ends with the caption "She lost him, but she found herself, and somehow that was everything," which is a hidden message written in the booklet of 1989.

Kahn said that Swift "suffered for the art"; she did not employ a double stunt and did all the action, such as crawling through the mud and running through the snow, by herself. Media publications remarked on the video's visual effects and cinematic storytelling. Amanda Bell from MTV News compared the video's cinematic quality to the Harry Potter series, and commented that the video's message "serves as a clear metaphor for her very public relationship history and how she transformed each conflict into her own personal victories, one in particular".

== Live performances and other usage ==
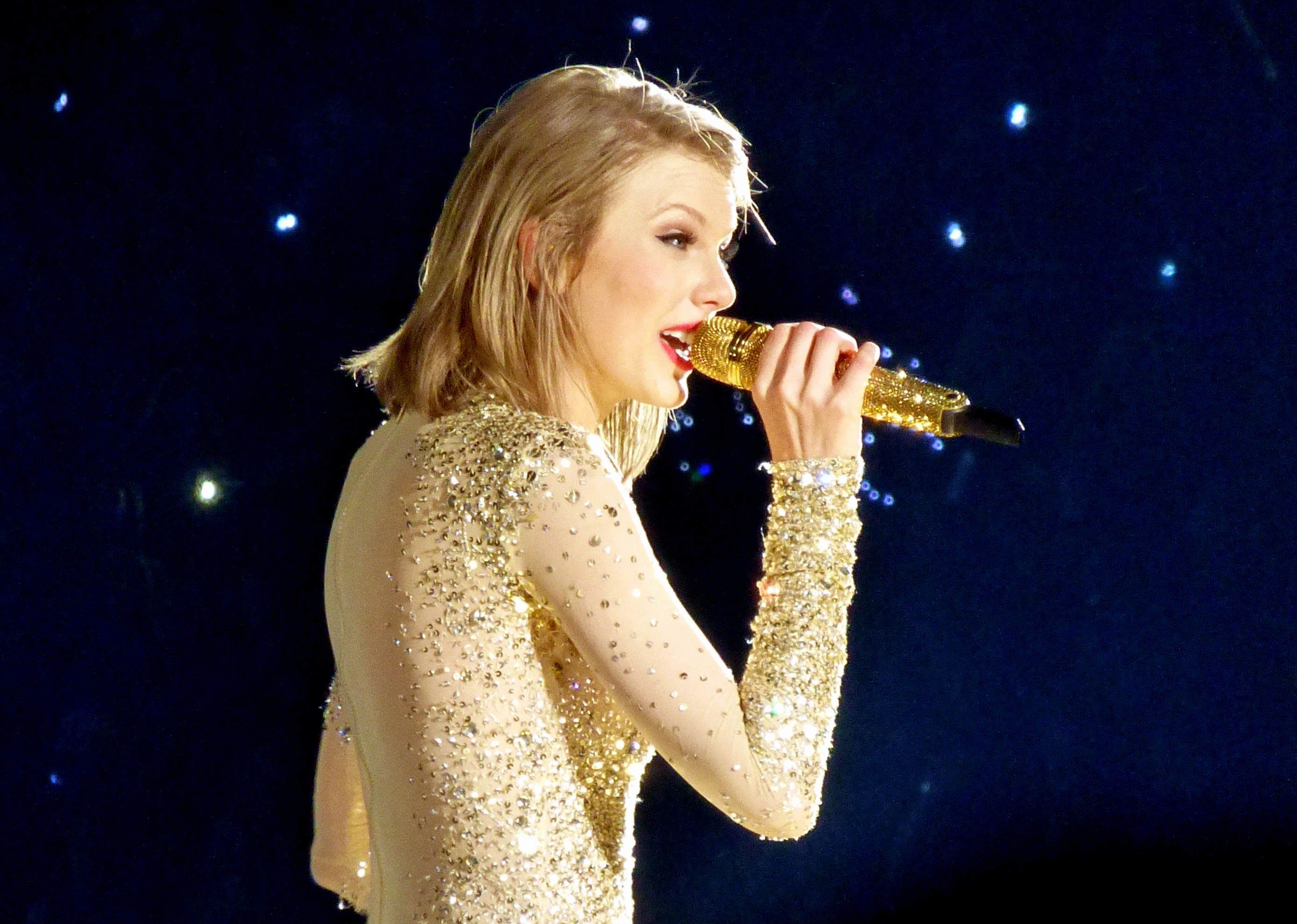
Swift performing "Out of the Woods" on the 1989 World Tour

During promotion of 1989, Swift performed "Out of the Woods" on televised shows including Jimmy Kimmel Live!, The Ellen DeGeneres Show, and Good Morning America. She performed the song as part of the "1989 Secret Sessions", live streamed by iHeartRadio and Yahoo! on October 27, 2014, the same day the album was released. On the 1989 World Tour in 2015, Swift included the song as the penultimate number on the regular set list. Swift played a stripped-down rendition of "Out of the Woods" on piano at the Grammy Museum in Los Angeles on September 30, 2015; John Blistein from Rolling Stone praised this version over the synth-pop production for better conveying the emotional sentiments of the lyrics.

On December 3, 2015, she sang the song on piano at Hamilton Island in Australia as part of a Nova 96.9 radio program. Swift performed "Out of the Woods" as the opening number to the 58th Annual Grammy Awards on February 15, 2016. She also included the song in the set lists of her shows at the Formula 1 Grand Prix in Austin on October 22, 2016, and DirecTV's pre-Super Bowl event Super Saturday Night in Houston on February 4, 2017. Swift sang "Out of the Woods" as a "surprise song" during the stops in Toronto and Auckland of her Reputation Stadium Tour (2018) and the stop in Nashville of her Eras Tour (2023–2024). Later on in the tour, she also performed the song in a mashup with "Is It Over Now?" (2023) in Buenos Aires and Paris, included "Clean" (2014) in London, "Getaway Car" (2017) in Milan, "All You Had to Do Was Stay" (2014) in Miami, and with "Us" (2024) in Toronto with the American singer-songwriter Gracie Abrams.

The rock singer Ryan Adams recorded a country folk-oriented cover of "Out of the Woods" for his track-by-track cover of Swift's 1989. Yahoo! writer Oscar Gracey said that the cover "makes us want to hike through a forest, find a clearing, and mourn the relationships that didn't quite work out", and The A.V. Club's Annie Zaleski viewed that Adams's acoustic production "exacerbates the song's uncertainty about a relationship's status".

"Out of the Woods" vocals was sampled on Swift's 2022 promotional single "Question...?". The sample was awarded "Favorite Use of a Sample" at the 2023 iHeartRadio Music Awards.

== Credits and personnel ==
Credits are adapted from the liner notes of 1989.

- Taylor Swift – vocals, songwriter, producer
- Jack Antonoff – producer, songwriter, guitar, electric guitar, bass, keyboards, drums, background vocals
- Cory Bice – recording assistant
- Tom Coyne – mastering
- Serban Ghenea – mixing
- John Hanes – mix engineer
- Sam Holland – recording
- Max Martin – vocal producer
- Brendan Morawski – recording assistant
- Laura Sisk – recording

== Charts ==
Chart performance
Chart (2014–2016)	Peak position
Australia (ARIA)	19
Austria (Ö3 Austria Top 40)	64
Belgium (Ultratop 50 Flanders)	50
Canada Hot 100 (Billboard)	8
Canada AC (Billboard)	13
Canada CHR/Top 40 (Billboard)	13
Canada Hot AC (Billboard)	9
Denmark (Tracklisten)	23
Finland Airplay (Radiosoittolista)	90
Finland Download (Latauslista)	24
France (SNEP)	70
Hong Kong (HKRIA)	5
Hungary (Single Top 40)	37
Italy (FIMI)	97
Mexico Airplay (Billboard)	47
New Zealand (Recorded Music NZ)	6
Poland (Polish Airplay Top 100)	43
Scottish Singles Sales (Official Charts)	48
Spain (Promusicae)	22
UK Singles (Official Charts Company)	136
US Billboard Hot 100	18
US Adult Contemporary (Billboard)	20
US Adult Pop Airplay (Billboard)	11
US Pop Airplay (Billboard)	12

2023 chart performance for "Out of the Woods"
Chart (2023)	Peak position
Portugal (AFP)	45

== Certifications ==
Certifications
Region	Certification	Certified units/sales
Australia (ARIA)	3× Platinum	210,000^{‡}
Brazil (Pro-Música Brasil)	Platinum	60,000^{‡}
Canada (Music Canada)	Gold	40,000^{*}
New Zealand (RMNZ)	Platinum	30,000^{‡}
Norway (IFPI Norway)	Platinum	60,000^{‡}
United Kingdom (BPI)	Gold	400,000^{‡}
United States (RIAA)	Platinum	1,000,000^{‡}
^{*} Sales figures based on certification alone.^{‡} Sales+streaming figures based on certification alone.

== Release history ==
=== Promotional release ===
Release date and formats for "Out of the Woods"
Region	Date	Format	Label	Ref.
Various	October 14, 2014	Digital download	Big Machine	

=== Single release ===
Release date and formats for "Out of the Woods"
Region	Date	Format(s)	Label(s)	Ref.
United States	January 19, 2016	Hot adult contemporary radio	Big Machine; Republic	
United States	January 19, 2016	Contemporary hit radio	Big Machine; Republic	
Italy	February 5, 2016	Radio airplay	Universal	

== "Out of the Woods (Taylor's Version)" ==
"Out of the Woods (Taylor's Version)"

Song by Taylor Swift

from the album 1989 (Taylor's Version)
- Released: October 27, 2023
- Studio: Conway Recording, Los Angeles; Electric Lady, New York; Rough Customer, New York; Sharp Sonics, Los Angeles
- Length: 3:55
- Label: Republic
- Songwriters: Taylor Swift; Jack Antonoff
- Producers: Taylor Swift; Jack Antonoff

Lyric video
- "Out of the Woods (Taylor's Version)" on YouTube

After signing a new contract with Republic Records, Swift began re-recording her first six studio albums in November 2020. The decision followed a public 2019 dispute between Swift and the talent manager Scooter Braun, who acquired Big Machine Records, including the masters of Swift's albums which the label had released. By re-recording the albums, Swift had full ownership of the new masters, which enabled her to control the licensing of her songs for commercial use in hopes of substituting the Big Machine–owned masters.

Republic Records released 1989's re-recording, 1989 (Taylor's Version), on October 27, 2023. The re-recording of "Out of the Woods", subtitled "Taylor's Version", was released as track number four on the re-recorded album. Prior to that, a snippet of "Out of the Woods (Taylor's Version)" was used in a trailer for the American animated adventure film Migration (2023).

=== Personnel ===
Credits are adapted from the liner notes of 1989 (Taylor's Version).

Technical

- Taylor Swift – producer
- Jack Antonoff – producer, recording, programming
- Zem Audu – synth recording
- Bryce Bordone – engineer for mix
- Jozef Caldwell – assistant engineer
- Serban Ghenea – mixing
- David Hart – synth recording
- Mikey Freedom Hart – synth recording, programming
- Sean Hutchinson – drums recording
- Oli Jacobs – recording
- Jack Manning – assistant engineer
- Joey Miller – assistant engineer
- Megan Searl – assistant engineer
- Jon Sher – assistant engineer
- Michael Riddleberger – drums recording
- Christopher Rowe – recording
- Laura Sisk – recording
- Evan Smith – Juno recording, programming

Musicians

- Taylor Swift – lead vocals, songwriter
- Jack Antonoff – songwriter, bass, drums, synthesizer, background vocals
- Zem Audu – synthesizer
- David Hart – acoustic guitar, electric guitar
- Mikey Freedom Hart – acoustic guitar, electric guitar, synthesizer, background vocals
- Sean Hutchinson – drums, percussion
- Michael Riddleberger – drums, percussion
- Evan Smith – Juno, background vocals

=== Charts ===
Chart performance
Chart (2023)	Peak position
Australia (ARIA)	12
Brazil Hot 100 (Billboard)	98
Canada Hot 100 (Billboard)	14
Global 200 (Billboard)	15
Greece International (IFPI)	18
Ireland (Billboard)	15
New Zealand (Recorded Music NZ)	16
Philippines (Billboard)	8
Singapore (RIAS)	16
Sweden (Sverigetopplistan)	77
UK (Billboard)	18
UK Singles Downloads (Official Charts)	84
UK Singles Sales (OCC)	92
UK Streaming (OCC)	19
US Billboard Hot 100	16
Vietnam (Vietnam Hot 100)	65

=== Certifications ===
Certifications
Region	Certification	Certified units/sales
Australia (ARIA)	Platinum	70,000^{‡}
Brazil (Pro-Música Brasil)	Gold	20,000^{‡}
United Kingdom (BPI)	Silver	200,000^{‡}
^{‡} Sales+streaming figures based on certification alone.

== See also ==
- List of number-one digital songs of 2014 (U.S.)
