= Happy (Pharrell Williams song) =

2013 single by Pharrell Williams

Single by Pharrell Williams

from the album Girl and Despicable Me 2: Original Motion Picture Soundtrack
- Released: November 21, 2013
- Recorded: February 2013
- Studio: Circle House (Miami)
- Genre: Soul; neo soul
- Length: 3:55
- Label: Back Lot; I Am Other; Columbia
- Songwriter: Pharrell Williams
- Producer: Pharrell Williams

Pharrell Williams singles chronology
"Lose Yourself to Dance" (2013)	"Happy" (2013)	"Move That Dope" (2014)

Music video
- "Happy" on YouTube

"Happy" is a song written, produced, and performed by American musician Pharrell Williams, released as the only single from the soundtrack album for the film Despicable Me 2 (2013). (Note: The song "Just a Cloud Away", also from the soundtrack, was released as a single on March 24, 2022, after a resurgence in popularity due to TikTok.) The song was first released on July 2, 2013 with the soundtrack, and it was released as a single on November 21, 2013, alongside a 24-hour-long music video. The song was reissued on December 16, 2013, by Back Lot Music under exclusive license to Columbia Records, a division of Sony Music. The song also served as the lead single from Williams's second studio album, Girl (2014). An official remix features American rapper Sky Blu of LMFAO.

"Happy" is an uptempo soul and neo soul song on which Williams's falsetto voice has been compared to Curtis Mayfield's by critics. The song has been highly successful, peaking at No. 1 in the United States, United Kingdom, Canada, Ireland, New Zealand, and 19 other countries. It was the best-selling song of 2014 in the United States with 6.45 million copies sold for the year, as well as in the United Kingdom with 1.5 million copies sold for the year. It reached No. 1 in the UK on a record-setting three occasions and became the most downloaded song of all time in the UK in September 2014; it is the ninth-highest-selling single of all time in the country. It was nominated for an Academy Award for Best Original Song. A live rendition of the song won the Grammy Award for Best Pop Solo Performance at the 57th Annual Grammy Awards.

The music video for "Happy" was nominated for Best Male Video and Video of the Year at the 2014 MTV Video Music Awards. It also won the Grammy Award for Best Music Video at the 57th Annual Grammy Awards. The song was Billboard's number-one single for 2014. "Happy" was the most successful song of 2014, with 13.9 million units (sales plus equivalent streams) worldwide. In 2024, the song appeared on the soundtrack to the LEGO animated biography of Williams' life, Piece by Piece.

== Background ==
Williams provided vocals for French duo Daft Punk's 2013 album Random Access Memories on the songs "Lose Yourself to Dance" and "Get Lucky". After returning from the recording sessions in Paris, he attended a meeting with record label managers who said that the results were "spectacular" and that "Get Lucky" would be Daft Punk's next single. They also made Williams an offer to record his own album, to which he agreed quickly, "overwhelmed that someone wanted to know what's in my heart".

On December 17, 2013, it was announced that Williams had signed to Columbia Records and would release his second studio album in 2014. Williams originally wrote the song for CeeLo Green and felt Green's recording of the song was better, but Elektra Records, Green's record label, decided against it since he was on the verge of releasing his Christmas album, Cee Lo's Magic Moment.

== Composition ==
"Happy" (2013)
A 23-second sample of "Happy", a soul song

"Happy" was written and produced by Williams, with backing vocals by Rhea Dummett, Trevon Henderson, Ashley L. Lee, Shamika Hightower, Jasmine Murray and Terrence Rolle. The track was digitally edited and arranged by Andrew Coleman and Mike Larson, who also recorded it with assistance from Matthew Desrameaux at Circle House Studios in Miami, Florida. The song was later mixed by Leslie Brathwaite at Music Box Studios in Atlanta, Georgia.

"Happy" plays for 3 minutes and 53 seconds in common time and at a tempo of 160 beats per minute. The song is written in the key of F minor. Williams sings the upper notes in falsetto; his vocal range spans from F_{3} to C_{5}. His singing on the track has been compared to that of Curtis Mayfield.

"Happy" is an up-tempo soul and neo soul song. According to music journalist Paul Tingen, "Happy" is "a mid-tempo ... song in a faux-Motown style, with an arrangement that is, by modern standards, very sparse: programmed drums, one bass and one keyboard part, and handclaps both programmed and played, all topped off by Williams's lead vocals and a whole posse of backing vocals". Jody Rosen viewed the song as a "standout" with a "sprightly neosoul funk groove".

== Critical reception ==
Professional ratings
Review scores
Source	Rating
Contactmusic.com	4/5 stars
Renowned for Sound	4/5 stars
Rolling Stone	3.5/5 stars

"Happy" was met with very positive reviews. Jody Rosen of Rolling Stone gave it 3.5 stars and deemed it "an instant contender for 2013's Song of the Summer". In a 4/5 review, Renowned for Sound's Huw Woodward said, "Happy is a rather... well... happy affair with a cheerful beat and exuberant vocal that would indicate that the former N.E.R.D. singer is finding a lot of lighthearted fun to be had in both music and life. 'Because I'm happy, clap along if you feel like happiness is the truth' sings Williams as the jaunty rhythm gets your head nodding." Holly Williams of Contactmusic.com gave it four stars, praising it for being "unbelievably catchy" and "the kind of song that makes you want to dance and sing along". Reggie Ugwu of Billboard called the song "Contagiously peppy and brilliantly simple". "Happy" was nominated for Best Original Song at the 86th Academy Awards on March 2, 2014, but lost to "Let It Go" from Frozen. In January 2015, "Happy" was ranked at No. 13 on The Village Voice's annual year-end Pazz & Jop critics' poll.

Retrospective reviews have been more critical. In 2022, Far Out placed "Happy" on its "The 10 worst songs to have spent 10 weeks at Number 1 on the Billboard Hot 100" list: "Featuring nonsensical lyrics such as 'clap along if you feel like a room without a roof,' it's a fine enough song for a children's film. However, there was no need for such a repetitive song to receive so much general radio play." Writing for Stereogum in his The Number Ones column, Tom Breihan gave the song a 3/10, calling it "a repetitive song, one that keeps running its chorus back and doesn't have a proper bridge."

== Chart performance ==
=== Netherlands ===
In October 2013, a month prior to its single release, "Happy" catapulted to No. 1 on the Dutch Top 40 chart in the Netherlands, partially as a result of radio station 3FM airplay and subsequent online downloads, as well as featuring in a Transavia commercial. It was released worldwide on November 21, 2013. In 2014, after 35 weeks on the charts and then still in the top 15, "Happy" became the most successful song in the Dutch Top 40 of all time. It went on to finish number five on the year-end Single Top 40 list, giving Williams three songs in the top five, along with "Blurred Lines" and "Get Lucky", both of which feature him.

=== United Kingdom ===
In the United Kingdom, "Happy" debuted at No. 71 on the UK Singles Chart on December 1, 2013. It then spent four weeks climbing before finally reaching No. 1 on December 29, becoming the final UK number one single of 2013. It became Williams' third No. 1 song in Britain, counting "Get Lucky" and "Blurred Lines", where he appeared as a featured artist. It has since spent four non-consecutive weeks at No. 1, reaching the peak on three separate occasions. In doing so, Williams became only the third artist ever to achieve this, and the first since Guy Mitchell in 1957 with "Singing the Blues". Following the single's third week at No. 1, it spent five weeks in the top three before returning to the summit, boosted by his performance at the 2014 Brit Awards. In the same week that "Happy" returned to No. 1 for the third time, it sold its millionth copy in the UK, Williams' third in under a year, having previously done so with Daft Punk's "Get Lucky" in June 2013, and Thicke's "Blurred Lines" in July 2013. This made Williams only the second artist in UK chart history (the first being the Beatles) to have three singles sell 1 million copies in under a year, as well as only the third artist ever to have three million-sellers, along with the Beatles (who have six) and Rihanna (who has four).

"Happy" was the best-selling single of UK in 2014, with 1.5 million copies sold for the year, and became the most downloaded song of all time in the UK by September 2014, with over 1.62 million sold. It had also been streamed over 25 million times and was the first song released in the 2010s to go 3× Platinum. With the inclusion of streaming, "Happy" has achieved combined sales of over 2 million. Additionally, "Happy" and Idina Menzel's "Let It Go" became the first singles ever to spend an entire calendar year on the official UK top 75 chart. On June 12, it was announced that "Happy" had overtaken "Evergreen" by Will Young as the UK's best-selling single of the 21st century, with sales of 1.81 million. "Happy" spent 92 weeks in the UK top 100. As of February 2020, the song has sold 1,950,000 copies.

=== New Zealand ===
On the New Zealand Singles Chart, "Happy" debuted at No. 11 on December 23, 2013. The next week it moved to No. 2. Then on January 6, 2014, "Happy" began a 12-week consecutive reign in the No. 1 position, right up until March 24, 2014. It then dropped to No. 2 for one week, then spent a further three weeks at No. 1, bringing the total number of weeks at No. 1 to fifteen, breaking the 36-year-long record for most weeks spent at No. 1, previously held by Boney M.'s "Rivers of Babylon". As of February 22, 2015, "Happy" had spent 62 straight weeks in the New Zealand Top 40 since its debut, before finally dropping out of the chart the following week. The song has been certified 7× Platinum in New Zealand.

=== United States ===
"Happy" reached the top of the US Billboard Hot 100 for the week ending March 8, 2014, giving Williams his fourth No. 1 single on the chart, and his first as lead artist. It took twelve years and a week (as the issue date is March 8, 2014) to achieve his first Hot 100 No. 1 hit as a lead artist. The song remained at No. 1 the following week, when it topped the Hot 100 Airplay chart. The song remained at the No. 1 position on the Hot 100 longer than any other song in the calendar year. On the week of May 17, 2014, after spending ten weeks at the summit, "Happy" was finally knocked off number one by John Legend's "All of Me" down to the No. 2 spot. "Happy" became the 28th song in the history of the chart to reach this milestone. It spent a total of 22 weeks in the top 10, entering on the week-ending February 15, 2014 and departing on July 19, 2014.

Topping the airplay charts for ten weeks, the song also holds the record for the second-highest audience peak for a week on the Hot 100 Airplay with 225.9 million impressions, while Robin Thicke's "Blurred Lines", a song in which Pharrell was featured as well as produced and co-wrote, holds the all-time record. The single was also the strongest in sales. It was number one on the Digital Song Sales for 11 weeks, and passed its 4 million sales mark in April 2014, the first song of 2014 to do so. The song sold 5,633,000 copies in the US in the first six months of 2014, the most ever of any song in the first six months of any calendar year. It was also the best-selling song of 2014 in the US with 6.45 million copies sold for the year, and has sold over 6.9 million total copies in the US as of April 2015. Relatively, the song performed the least on streaming, staying at number-one on the streaming chart for four weeks.

=== Other charts ===
The song also topped the charts of 22 other countries, including Australia, Austria, Canada, France, Germany, Ireland, Italy, Poland and Spain. It spent twelve weeks (including seven consecutive) at No. 1 in Ireland, making it the third song in less than a year to spend more than seven weeks at No. 1, after Robin Thicke's "Blurred Lines" and Avicii's "Wake Me Up!". In France, "Happy" spent 22 weeks at No. 1, the longest reign at the top of the Syndicat National de l'Edition Phonographique (until 2026 with "Melodrama"), beating Lou Bega's "Mambo No. 5", which spent 20 weeks at No. 1 in 1999.

== Music video ==
To coincide with the single release, the website 24hoursofhappy.com was launched, featuring a visual presentation of "Happy" advertised as "the world's first 24-hour music video". It was directed by the French directing team We Are from LA with creative director Yoann Lemoine, and shot by steadicam operator Jon Beattie. It consists of the four-minute song repeated multiple times, with various people dancing around Los Angeles and miming along. The website allows users to navigate to various points in the 24-hour timeframe, including all 360 four-minute segments. The video featured appearances by Jimmy Kimmel, Tyler, the Creator, Jamie Foxx, Magic Johnson, Issa Rae, Earl Sweatshirt, Kelly Osbourne, JoJo, Sérgio Mendes, Ryan Heffington, Whit Hertford, Leah LaBelle, Jasper Dolphin, and Despicable Me 2 stars Steve Carell and Miranda Cosgrove. It held the Guinness World Record for the longest music video until 2020, when it was surpassed by Twenty One Pilots's 178-day long live stream of fan clips for their single "Level of Concern".

A four-minute edit of the video was also released onto the I Am Other and Williams's own YouTube channel on November 21, 2013, and January 8, 2014 respectively; both uploads of the video had received over a billion views each as of April 2024. It was nominated for Best Male Video and Video of the Year at the 2014 MTV Video Music Awards. The 24-hour version of the music video for "Happy" was also projected at the Buenos Aires International Festival of Independent Cinema in April 2014.

=== "Happy" tribute videos ===
The original video spawned many cover videos on YouTube in which people from different cities throughout the world dance to the song. Those videos are usually called "Pharrell Williams – Happy – We Are from [name of the city]". As of May 2014, more than 1,500 videos have been created. Inspired by this global phenomenon, a French couple launched a website wearehappyfrom.com to showcase the remakes. In April 2014, the Embassy of the United States, Yerevan, Armenia released a video titled "Happy Yerevan", directed by Artyom Abovyan featuring US ambassador John A. Heffern and several Armenian celebrities, such as singers André, Emmy and Aram Mp3. The same month artsmedia Albania produced a music video for the track featuring inhabitants of Tirana. The video soon became popular in Albania and caused controversy over the usage of images of Albanian First Secretary Enver Hoxha.

==== Arrests in Iran for tribute ====
In May 2014, a group of Iranian fans who created a tribute to "Happy" were arrested. According to a police chief, the song represented vulgarity and also hurt public chastity. Williams responded to the arrest in a tweet stating "It's beyond sad these kids were arrested for trying to spread happiness." Soon after Iran's President Hassan Rouhani criticized the arrest when he tweeted "#Happiness is our people's right. We shouldn't be too hard on behaviours caused by joy." The dancers, along with the director, were later released. It was reported on September 19, 2014, that seven of the individuals in the Iranian video had been handed sentences, suspended for three years, of 91 lashes each along with jail by Iranian courts.

=== "Weird Al" Yankovic parody ===
In 2014, American musician "Weird Al" Yankovic parodied "Happy" as "Tacky" on his fourteenth studio album Mandatory Fun. The song mocks questionable style in fashion as well as activities considered gauche. Yankovic recorded the song as one of the last on Mandatory Fun, and received Williams' approval directly, through email. He remarked he was "honored" to have his work spoofed by Yankovic. The song's one-shot music video parodies "Happy", and was the first in a series of eight videos released over eight days in promotion of Mandatory Fun. It features cameo appearances by Aisha Tyler, Margaret Cho, Eric Stonestreet, Kristen Schaal, and Jack Black, and was produced by Nerdist Industries.

== Credits and personnel ==
Recording

- Recorded at Circle House Studios, Miami, Florida
- Mixed at Music Box Studios, Atlanta, Georgia

Personnel

- Pharrell Williams – lead vocals, background vocals, keyboards, drums, bass guitar, writing, production
- Rhea Dummett – backing vocals
- Trevon Henderson – backing vocals
- Ashley L. Lee – backing vocals
- Shamika Hightower – backing vocals
- Jasmine Murray – backing vocals
- Terrence Rolle – backing vocals
- Amir Windom – A&R
- Ali Khazaee – Cover Art
- Mike Larson – recording, digital editing, arrangement
- Matthew Desrameaux – recording assistant
- Andrew Coleman – digital editing, arrangement
- Leslie Brathwaite – mixer
- Reuben Cohen – mastering

== Charts ==
=== Weekly charts ===
Weekly chart performance for "Happy"
Chart (2013–2016)	Peak position
Australia (ARIA)	1
Austria (Ö3 Austria Top 40)	1
Belgium (Ultratop 50 Flanders)	1
Belgium (Ultratop 50 Wallonia)	1
Belgium (Ultratop Flanders Urban)	1
Brazil (Billboard Brasil Hot 100)	17
Bulgaria Airplay (BAMP)	1
Canada Hot 100 (Billboard)	1
CIS Airplay (TopHit)	1
Croatia International Airplay (HRT)	1
Czech Republic Airplay (ČNS IFPI)	1
Czech Republic Singles Digital (ČNS IFPI)	1
Denmark (Tracklisten)	1
Dominican Republic (Monitor Latino)	11
Euro Digital Songs (Billboard)	1
Finland (Suomen virallinen lista)	7
Finland Airplay (Radiosoittolista)	6
France (SNEP)	1
Germany (GfK)	1
Germany (Airplay Chart)	1
Greece Digital Songs (Billboard)	1
Hungary (Dance Top 40)	4
Hungary (Rádiós Top 40)	1
Hungary (Single Top 40)	1
Ireland (IRMA)	1
Israel International Airplay (Media Forest)	1
Italy (FIMI)	1
Italy Airplay (EarOne)	1
Japan Hot 100 (Billboard)	5
Lebanon (The Official Lebanese Top 20)	1
Luxembourg Digital Songs (Billboard)	1
Mexico (Billboard Ingles Airplay)	1
Mexico Anglo (Monitor Latino)	1
Moldova (Media Forest)	1
Netherlands (Dutch Top 40)	1
Netherlands (Single Top 100)	1
New Zealand (Recorded Music NZ)	1
Norway (VG-lista)	1
Poland Dance (ZPAV)	6
Poland Airplay (ZPAV)	1
Portugal Digital Songs (Billboard)	1
Romania (Airplay 100)	1
Romania Airplay (Media Forest)	1
Romania TV Airplay (Media Forest)	1
Russia Airplay (TopHit)	1
Scottish Singles Sales (Official Charts)	2
South Africa Airplay (EMA)	1
South Korea International Singles (Gaon)	5
Slovakia Airplay (ČNS IFPI)	1
Slovakia Singles Digital (ČNS IFPI)	16
Slovenia (SloTop50)	1
Spain (Promusicae)	1
Sweden (Sverigetopplistan)	3
Switzerland (Schweizer Hitparade)	1
UK Singles (Official Charts)	1
UK Independent (Official Charts)	1
Ukraine Airplay (TopHit)	11
US Billboard Hot 100	1
US Adult Alternative Airplay (Billboard)	14
US Adult Contemporary (Billboard)	1
US Adult R&B Songs (Billboard)	1
US Adult Pop Airplay (Billboard)	1
US Dance Airplay (Billboard)	11
US Dance Club Songs (Billboard)	14
US Hot R&B/Hip-Hop Songs (Billboard)	1
US Pop Airplay (Billboard)	1
US Rhythmic Airplay (Billboard)	1
US Rock & Alternative Airplay (Billboard)	45
Venezuela Pop Rock (Record Report)	1

=== Monthly charts ===
2025 monthly chart performance for "Happy"
Chart (2025)	Peak position
Romania Airplay (TopHit)	88

=== Year-end charts ===
2013 year-end chart performance
Chart (2013)	Position
Australia (ARIA)	92
France (SNEP)	62
Netherlands (Dutch Top 40)	9
Netherlands (Single Top 100)	5
UK Singles (Official Charts Company)	85

2014 year-end chart performance
Chart (2014)	Position
Australia (ARIA)	1
Austria (Ö3 Austria Top 40)	2
Belgium (Ultratop 50 Flanders)	1
Belgium (Ultratop 50 Wallonia)	1
Brazil (Billboard Hot 100 Airplay)	10
Canada (Canadian Hot 100)	1
Denmark (Tracklisten)	2
France (SNEP)	1
Germany (Official German Charts)	2
Hungary (Dance Top 40)	18
Hungary (Rádiós Top 40)	6
Hungary (Single Top 40)	1
Ireland (IRMA)	1
Israel (Media Forest)	1
Italy (FIMI)	2
Italy Airplay (EarOne)	1
Japan (Japan Hot 100)	6
Japan Adult Contemporary (Billboard)	1
Netherlands (Dutch Top 40)	9
Netherlands (Single Top 100)	2
New Zealand (Recorded Music NZ)	1
Poland (ZPAV)	4
Romania (Airplay 100)	1
Russia Airplay (TopHit)	7
Slovenia (SloTop50)	4
Spain (PROMUSICAE)	2
Sweden (Sverigetopplistan)	6
Switzerland (Schweizer Hitparade)	1
Taiwan (Hito Radio)	44
UK Singles (Official Charts Company)	1
Ukraine Airplay (TopHit)	44
US Billboard Hot 100	1
US Adult Contemporary (Billboard)	6
US Adult Top 40 (Billboard)	7
US Hot R&B/Hip-Hop Songs (Billboard)	1
US Mainstream Top 40 (Billboard)	9
US Rhythmic (Billboard)	12
Venezuela Pop Rock General (Record Report)	2

2015 year-end chart performance
Chart (2015)	Position
Belgium (Ultratop 50 Flanders)	91
Belgium (Ultratop 50 Wallonia)	70
Brazil (Crowley)	92
Canada (Canadian Hot 100)	73
France (SNEP)	68
Hungary (Single Top 40)	63
Japan (Japan Hot 100)	41
Netherlands (Single Top 100)	100
Spain (PROMUSICAE)	87

2016 year-end chart performance
Chart (2016)	Position
Brazil Airplay (Brasil Hot 100)	55
France (SNEP)	186

2017 year-end chart performance
Chart (2017)	Position
Panama Anglo Airplay (Monitor Latino)	91

2024 year-end chart performance
Chart (2024)	Position
Romania Airplay (TopHit)	171

2025 year-end chart performance
Chart (2025)	Position
Argentina Anglo Airplay (Monitor Latino)	62
CIS Airplay (TopHit)	183
Romania Airplay (TopHit)	175

=== Decade-end charts ===
2010s-end chart performance
Chart (2010–2019)	Position
Australia (ARIA)	5
Germany (Official German Charts)	8
Netherlands (Single Top 100)	1
UK Singles (Official Charts Company)	7
US Billboard Hot 100	21
US Hot R&B/Hip-Hop Songs (Billboard)	9

=== All-time charts ===
All-time chart performance for "Happy"
Chart	Position
UK Singles (Official Charts Company)	9

== Certifications ==
Certifications and sales
Region	Certification	Certified units/sales
Australia (ARIA)	11× Platinum	770,000^{‡}
Austria (IFPI Austria)	Gold	15,000^{*}
Belgium (BRMA)	4× Platinum	80,000^{‡}
Canada (Music Canada)	Diamond	800,000^{‡}
Denmark (IFPI Danmark)	Platinum	30,000^{^}
France (SNEP)	Diamond	335,000
Germany (BVMI)	9× Gold	1,350,000^{‡}
Italy (FIMI)	6× Platinum	180,000^{‡}
Japan (RIAJ)	2× Platinum	500,000^{*}
Mexico (AMPROFON)	2× Diamond	600,000^{‡}
New Zealand (RMNZ)	7× Platinum	105,000^{*}
Norway (IFPI Norway)	3× Platinum	30,000^{*}
Portugal (AFP)	Gold	10,000^{‡}
Spain (Promusicae)	4× Platinum	160,000^{‡}
Sweden (GLF)	4× Platinum	160,000^{‡}
Switzerland (IFPI Switzerland)	3× Platinum	90,000^{^}
United Kingdom (BPI)	7× Platinum	4,200,000^{‡}
United States (RIAA)	11× Platinum	11,000,000^{‡}
Streaming
Denmark (IFPI Danmark)	4× Platinum	10,400,000^{†}
Japan (RIAJ)	Gold	50,000,000^{†}
Spain (Promusicae)	2× Platinum	16,000,000^{†}
^{*} Sales figures based on certification alone.^{^} Shipments figures based on certification alone.^{‡} Sales+streaming figures based on certification alone.^{†} Streaming-only figures based on certification alone.

== Release history ==
Street dates
Region	Date	Format	Label
Worldwide	May 22, 2013	Streaming	
Australia	November 21, 2013	Digital download	Back Lot Music
Austria	November 21, 2013	Digital download	Back Lot Music
Belgium	November 21, 2013	Digital download	Back Lot Music
Canada	November 21, 2013	Digital download	Back Lot Music
Denmark	November 21, 2013	Digital download	Back Lot Music
Finland	November 21, 2013	Digital download	Back Lot Music
France	November 21, 2013	Digital download	Back Lot Music
Germany	November 21, 2013	Digital download	Back Lot Music
Greece	November 21, 2013	Digital download	Back Lot Music
Italy	November 21, 2013	Digital download	Back Lot Music
Japan	November 21, 2013	Digital download	Back Lot Music
Latin America	November 21, 2013	Digital download	Back Lot Music
Netherlands	November 21, 2013	Digital download	Back Lot Music
New Zealand	November 21, 2013	Digital download	Back Lot Music
Norway	November 21, 2013	Digital download	Back Lot Music
Spain	November 21, 2013	Digital download	Back Lot Music
Sweden	November 21, 2013	Digital download	Back Lot Music
United Kingdom	November 21, 2013	Digital download	Back Lot Music
United States	November 21, 2013	Digital download	Back Lot Music
United States	January 13, 2014	Adult contemporary	Columbia
United States	January 21, 2014	Contemporary hit radio	Columbia

== See also ==
- Billboard Year-End Hot 100 singles of 2014
- List of Airplay 100 number ones of the 2010s
- List of best-selling singles
- List of best-selling singles in Australia
- List of best-selling singles of the 2000s (century) in the United Kingdom
- List of Billboard Hot 100 number-one singles of 2014
- List of Billboard Hot 100 top 10 singles in 2014
- List of Billboard Mainstream Top 40 number-one songs of 2014
- List of Canadian Hot 100 number-one singles of 2014
- List of Dutch Top 40 number-one singles of 2013
- List of million-selling singles in the United Kingdom
- List of Billboard Adult Contemporary number ones of 2014
- List of number-one Billboard Streaming Songs of 2014
- List of number-one digital songs of 2014 (U.S.)
- List of number-one digital tracks of 2014 (Australia)
- List of number-one hits of 2013 (France)
- List of number-one hits of 2014 (Austria)
- List of number-one hits of 2014 (Denmark)
- List of number-one hits of 2014 (France)
- List of number-one hits of 2014 (Germany)
- List of number-one hits of 2014 (Italy)
- List of number-one hits of 2014 (Switzerland)
- List of number-one R&B/hip-hop songs of 2014 (U.S.)
- List of number-one singles of 2014 (Australia)
- List of number-one singles of 2014 (Finland)
- List of number-one singles of 2014 (Ireland)
- List of number-one singles of 2014 (Poland)
- List of number-one singles of 2014 (Slovenia)
- List of number-one singles of 2014 (South Africa)
- List of number-one singles of 2014 (Spain)
- List of number-one streaming tracks of 2014 (Australia)
- List of top 10 singles in 2013 (France)
- List of top 100 singles of 2014 (France)
- List of Top 25 singles for 2014 in Australia
- List of UK Independent Singles Chart number ones of 2013
- List of UK top 10 singles in 2013
- List of UK top 10 singles in 2014
- List of Ultratop 50 number-one singles of 2014
- List of songs which have spent the most weeks on the UK Singles Chart
- New Zealand top 50 singles of 2014

== Notes ==
1. The song "Just a Cloud Away", also from the soundtrack, was released as a single on March 24, 2022, after a resurgence in popularity due to TikTok.
