= Dark Horse (Katy Perry song) =

2013 single by Katy Perry

Single by Katy Perry featuring Juicy J

from the album Prism
- Released: December 17, 2013
- Studio: Playback Recording Studios (Santa Barbara, California); MXM Studios (Stockholm, Sweden); Luke's in the Boo (Malibu, California); Secret Garden Studios (Montecito, California)
- Genre: Trap; hip-hop; pop rap; electropop
- Length: 3:35
- Label: Capitol
- Songwriters: Katy Perry; Jordan Houston; Lukasz Gottwald; Sarah Theresa Hudson; Max Martin; Henry Walter
- Producers: Dr. Luke; Max Martin; Cirkut

Katy Perry singles chronology
"Unconditionally" (2013)	"Dark Horse" (2013)	"Birthday" (2014)

Juicy J singles chronology
"Lolly" (2013)	"Dark Horse" (2013)	"Shell Shocked" (2014)

Music video
- "Dark Horse" on YouTube

"Dark Horse" is a song by American singer Katy Perry featuring American rapper Juicy J. It was originally released on September 17, 2013, by Capitol Records as the first promotional single from Perry's fourth studio album, Prism (2013). Three months later, it was released as the third official single on December 17. Both artists co-wrote the song with its producers, Max Martin, Cirkut, and Dr. Luke, alongside Sarah Hudson. It was conceived by Perry and Hudson during a writing session in Perry's hometown of Santa Barbara, California, and Juicy J was later commissioned for a verse on the song. The song was recorded at Playback Recording Studios in Santa Barbara, alongside MXM Studios, based in Stockholm, Sweden, Luke's in the Boo, based in Malibu, California, and Secret Garden Studios, based in Montecito, California.

"Dark Horse" combines the genres of trap, hip hop, pop-rap and electropop, replicating what has been described as a "Southern rap-techno mashup", and is heavily influenced by witch house: an underground electronic music genre that features occult themes, trap drums, and the heavy bass lines featured in the track. The track features a minimal production, with a "seductive" and "mature" tone to Perry's vocals, while Juicy J is featured on the song's intro and rapped third verse. Perry, in interviews, said she wanted the song to have a "witchy, spell-y kind of black magic-y idea", so she wrote it from the perspective of a witch warning a man not to fall in love with her because if he does, she will be his last. The song was part of a competition sponsored by Pepsi in which fans could vote via Twitter on whether they would prefer either "Dark Horse" or "Walking on Air" to be released as the first promotional single from Prism.

"Dark Horse" was a commercial success, charting at number one in Canada, the Netherlands, Poland, and the United States. It also reached the top ten in almost 20 countries, including New Zealand, the United Kingdom, Sweden, and Venezuela, as well as on the Digital Songs chart of Billboard magazine. Billboard credits "Dark Horse" for helping cement trap music's place on the charts. Perry first performed the song live at the 2013 iHeartRadio Music Festival in Las Vegas on September 20, 2013. The song's first major television performance was at the 56th Annual Grammy Awards on January 26, 2014. "Dark Horse" was nominated for Best Pop Duo/Group Performance at the 57th Annual Grammy Awards. It won Single of the Year at the 2014 American Music Awards. The song was certified diamond in Australia, Brazil, Canada, France, and the United States. "Dark Horse" has sold 13.2 million units (combined sales and track-equivalent streams), becoming the second best-selling song worldwide for 2014. In 2015, the song was performed at Pepsi's Super Bowl XLIX halftime show in Glendale, Arizona.

In 2014, Flame, a Christian rap artist, filed a copyright infringement lawsuit against Perry and the other songwriters, claiming that "Dark Horse" copied from his 2008 song "Joyful Noise". On July 29, 2019, a federal jury ruled in favor of Flame and the co-plaintiffs Da' T.R.U.T.H. and Chike Ojukwu. The jury ordered Perry, her collaborators, and associated labels to pay $2.78 million in damages; of which Perry was ordered to pay $550,000. However, in part due to a similar judgment that found Led Zeppelin's "Stairway to Heaven" clear of copyright infringement in the Ninth Circuit, the jury award was vacated on appeal in March 2020.

== Production and release ==
Inspired by the 1996 film The Craft, Perry and singer-songwriter Sarah Hudson wrote the first version of "Dark Horse" in Perry's hometown of Santa Barbara, California. Perry described the song as a "juxtaposition", as it mixed her, a pop music artist, with an "urban kind of hip-hop-flavored background soundtrack"; and its lyrics as "witchy and dark", written from the perspective of "a witch warning [a] man to not fall in love with [her]", and if so, she would be his last. Perry then asked producer Dr. Luke to contact one of his Kemosabe Records artists, American rapper Juicy J, for a guest verse. Juicy J complimented Perry as having a "very professional" work ethic and being substantially involved in the song's development. He said: "My verse I did on that song, she was singing it. She's really a genius, she was by the mixing board and telling the guy what to take in and take out. She's really hands-on with her music, she knows music."

"Dark Horse" was recorded and engineered at Luke's in the Boo in Malibu, Conway Recording Studios in Hollywood, Playback Recording Studios in Santa Barbara, California, and Secret Garden Studios in Montecito, as well as MXM Studios in Stockholm, Sweden. It was engineered by Peter Carlsson, Mike "Crazy Mike" Foster, Clint Gibbs, Sam Holland, and Michael Ilbert. They were assisted by Eric Eylands, Rachael Findlen, Justin Fox, Elliot Lanam, and Cory Bice. It was mixed by Şerban Ghenea, while John Hanes served as the engineer for mix. All instrumentation and programming was done by Dr. Luke, Max Martin, and Cirkut.

In a press release on August 20, 2013, Pepsi announced a partnership with Perry to promote her fourth studio album Prism: a social "tweet-to-unlock" voting program, encouraging fans to tweet the hashtag #KATYNOW in exchange for song titles and lyrics. The chosen tracks for the campaign were "Walking on Air" and "Dark Horse". After the samples were revealed, fans could vote for which one they wanted to have an early release on digital retailers. The winner was "Dark Horse", which was released on September 17, 2013, on the iTunes Store. Due to its commercial success, it was sent to contemporary hit and rhythmic radio stations on December 17, 2013, as Prism's third official single.

== Composition ==
"Dark Horse" is a trap, hip hop, pop rap and electropop song. which is styled in "Southern rap-techno mashup", and has a length of three minutes and thirty-five seconds. Musically, the verses are built around icy rhythms and chopped and screwed vocal samples, while the chorus' feature Perry singing into a gradual crescendo. The song contains a grimy, "incredibly simplistic" production. According to Kathy Iandoli of MSN Entertainment, "Dark Horse" contains a mixture of elements from "trippy pop", EDM, and dubstep. According to the sheet music published at Musicnotes.com, "Dark Horse" is written in the key of B♭ minor. It follows a chord progression of G♭ – D♭ – B♭m – B♭m/A♭, and the vocals range from the low note of B♭_{3} to the high note of D♭_{5}. "Dark Horse" has a tempo of 132 beats per minute in half-time style typical of trap music. A writer for the Winnipeg Free Press described the song as "brooding, borderline sleazy trap-pop excursion that comes across like a stripped-down version of 'E.T.' mixed with 'Grindin'' by The Clipse", before going on to call it unexpected, unconventional, and unstoppable.

== Critical reception ==
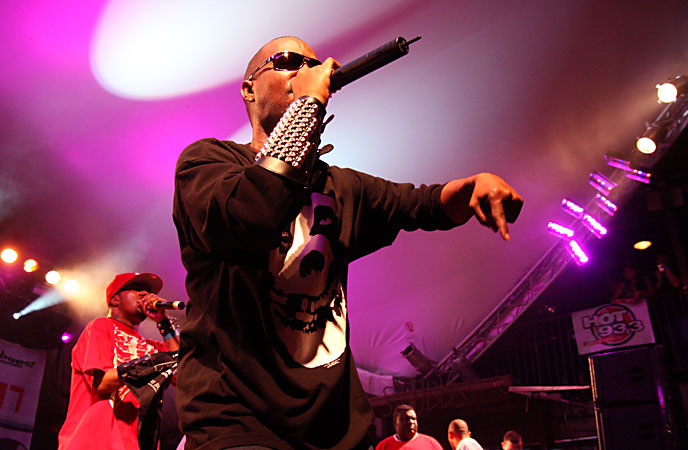
The critical response to guest vocals from Juicy J (pictured) was generally negative.

Marc Hogan from Spin called the lyrics a "cliché salad" but believed that the song had potential to become a hit due to its "soaring hooks" and "sleekly sculpted production". Reviewing the song for Billboard, Jason Lipshutz said that by exploring trap-influenced music, Perry "score[d]" and "slay[ed]". Digital Spy's Robert Copsey questioned the decision to not have a proper chorus in "Dark Horse" and the inclusion of Juicy J, though he praised the "sleazy" beat and "sultry" vocals from Katy Perry. He gave the track a rating of four stars out of five. Contributor Dylan Mial of Blogcritics said the "juxtaposition" of Perry's vocals and Juicy J's rap brought "the ingredients for a perfect musical storm" and favored Perry for the "uniqueness" of the single.

Keith Murphy from Vibe called the track "infectiously sexy", while John Walker from MTV was similarly positive about the song, though he wrote that Juicy's verse was "phoned-in". Sal Cinquemani of Slant Magazine likened the song to avant-garde band Art of Noise's song "Moments In Love" and called it a "continuation" of "E.T.", and further labelled it as a "standout" from Prism. While she did not give her opinion of the song as a whole, Helen Brown from the publication The Daily Telegraph criticized Juicy J for his "daft" rap. For AbsolutePunk, Craig Manning classified "Dark Horse" as Prism's worst song, while also panning the rapper's contribution. Marah Eakin from The A.V. Club was not entirely critical of the song, though she noted that it was not among "Perry's best".

Consequence of Sound's Chris Bosman had a mixed response—while he praised the song for feeling "vital" and "forward-moving", he criticized the guest vocals and nonetheless deemed the trap influence "trap for soccer moms". Writing for ABC News, Mesfin Fekadu commented that "her team fare[d] better" in the song and observed that the "Southern hip-hop and electronic flavors" present on it were factors that made it "work".

== Accolades ==
=== Awards and nominations ===
Name of award, year listed, category, and result
Award	Year	Category	Result	Ref.
American Music Awards	2014	Single of the Year	Won	
Berlin Music Video Awards	2014	Best Art Director (Note: The music video director, Mathew Cullen, was nominated.)	Nominated	
Billboard Mid-Year Awards (Note: The Billboard Mid-Year Awards are a fan-voted poll conducted by the publication to recognize the most popular artists and music based on fan votes, reflecting fan preferences during the first half of the year.)	2014	Favorite Number One Hot 100 Song	Nominated	
Billboard Mid-Year Awards	2014	Best Music Video	Nominated	
Latin Music Italian Awards	2014	Best International Song of the Year	Nominated	
Latin Music Italian Awards	2014	Best International Female Video of the Year	Nominated	
Los 40 Music Awards	2014	Best International Video	Nominated	
MP3 Music Awards	2014	The RCD Award (Note: "RCD" stands for radio, charts, and downloads.)	Nominated	
MTV Europe Music Awards	2014	Best Song	Nominated	
MTV Europe Music Awards	2014	Best Video	Won	
MTV Video Music Awards	2014	Best Female Video	Won	
MTV Video Music Awards	2014	Best Collaboration	Nominated	
Much Music Video Awards	2014	International Video of the Year – Artist	Nominated	
Planeta Awards	2014	Best Hip-hop/R&B Song of the Year	Won	
Premios Juventud	2014	Favorite Song, Not in Spanish	Nominated	
Teen Choice Awards	2014	Choice Music: Single by a Female Artist	Nominated	
TeleHit Awards	2014	Video of the Year	Won	
Vevo Certified Awards	2014	Vevo Certified Award	Won	
Vevo Hot This Year Awards	2014	Video of the Year	Won	
Vevo Hot This Year Awards	2014	Best Pop Video	Won	
Vevo Hot This Year Awards	2014	Best Certified Video	Won	
BMI Pop Awards	2015	Award Winning Song (Note: Juicy J, one of the songwriters, received the award.)	Won	
Grammy Awards	2015	Best Pop Duo/Group Performance	Nominated	
iHeartRadio Music Awards	2015	Best Collaboration	Nominated	
Myx Music Awards	2015	Favorite International Video	Nominated	
Nickelodeon Kids' Choice Awards	2015	Favorite Song	Nominated	
RIAA Diamond Awards	2017	Diamond Song Award	Won	
Spotify Awards	2022	Billion-Play Award (Note: Spotify awards plaques to artists when their songs reach a billion streams on the platform.)	Won	

=== Listicles ===
Name of publication, year listed, name of listicle, and result
Publication	Year	Listicle	Result	Ref.
ABC News	2014	Spring Songs	Placed	
XXL	2016	Best Hip-hop and Pop Collaborations	Placed	
Revolt	2024	Best Pop Songs with a Rap Verse	9th	
The Times of India	2025	Most Controversial Music Videos	5th	
Yardbarker	2025	Best Hip-hop and Pop Collaborations	17th	

== Commercial performance ==
"Dark Horse" debuted at number seventeen on the Billboard Hot 100 and at number four on the Hot Digital Songs chart with 194,000 downloads sold for the week ending October 5, 2013. Following its release as a single, after several weeks of ascending the chart, "Dark Horse" reached number one in the United States on the chart dated February 8, 2014. It marked Perry's ninth US number one and Juicy J's first, and remained atop the chart for four consecutive weeks. It spent 22 weeks in the top ten and 57 weeks on the chart in total, marking Perry's longest stay in both the top ten and on the Hot 100 itself. Besides its success on the Hot 100, "Dark Horse" also performed extremely well on Billboard's component charts, topping the Mainstream Top 40 chart for five weeks, giving Perry her record-tying eleventh number-one, the Hot Dance Club Songs chart, becoming her record-extending thirteenth consecutive number one, and the Rhythmic chart, becoming her second number one, while reaching numbers two and six on the Adult Pop Songs and the Adult Contemporary charts respectively. As of August 2020, the song has sold 6.4 million copies in the nation, and has been certified eleven-times platinum by the Recording Industry Association of America (RIAA).

In Canada, "Dark Horse" debuted at number eight on the Canadian Hot 100 chart, and peaked at number one for two weeks, becoming the Perry's tenth number-one single in the country and Juicy J's first, and has since been certified seven-times platinum by Music Canada for sales of 560,000 units. "Dark Horse" peaked at number two on the New Zealand Singles Chart becoming Perry's twelfth top ten, and was certified double platinum by the RMNZ. In Australia, the song was not eligible to chart on the ARIA Top 100 Singles Chart as it was seen as a digital-only release, but peaked at number five on the ARIA Top 50 Digital Tracks and was certified eight-times platinum by the ARIA, for sales of 560,000 units. "Dark Horse" also saw major success in Europe. In the UK, it peaked at number four on the UK Singles Chart, becoming her thirteenth top ten hit, while peaking at number three in both Ireland and Scotland. The song topped the charts in the Netherlands, Belgium (Flanders), and Poland, while reaching number two in Austria, Norway, and Sweden, number three in Belgium (Wallonia), number four in Switzerland and the Czech Republic, number five in Italy, number six in Germany, France, and Denmark, number eight in Hungary, and number nine in Spain. It earned certifications in Sweden (four times platinum), Italy (three times platinum), Norway (three times platinum), the UK (two times platinum), Mexico (two times platinum), Germany (three times gold), and Belgium (gold). "Dark Horse" sold 13.2 million units worldwide in 2014, finishing as the second best-selling song of the year according to the International Federation of the Phonographic Industry (IFPI).

== Music video ==
=== Background and release ===
In an interview with Billboard at the 2014 Grammy Awards, Juicy J stated the video will be filmed "soon"; he added that it is "a major motion picture." He further teased the release by saying, "I can't really tell you because it's definitely going to be a surprise, but I'll tell you this much right here: you've seen her other videos, this one's gonna be just as big. Everything she does is like grade A."

When "Dark Horse" had attained the top position on the US Billboard Hot 100 Chart, Perry announced that she was working on the video. On February 6, 2014, Perry tweeted the video would be released "soon". On February 13, 2014, she released a preview of the music video onto her Vevo account on YouTube, revealing the Egyptian setting of the video. Perry played a character named "Katy Pätra", a takeoff on the Egyptian queen Cleopatra. The video was released on February 20, 2014.

The music video was directed by Mathew Cullen, who previously worked with Perry on her music video for the song "California Gurls". Perry's idea for the music video was to combine Ancient Egyptian culture with Memphis, Tennessee hip hop: setting the video in ancient Memphis, Egypt as a nod to Juicy J's Tennessee hometown. Speaking of Perry's concept, Cullen said "That's music to my ears — when an artist has a couple concepts that they want to mash up to create something fresh."

The music video for "Dark Horse" was the most viewed music video in 2014 worldwide. On June 9, 2015, the music video for "Dark Horse" became the first video by a female artist to reach one billion views on Vevo. Perry also became the first female to have a video on YouTube with one billion views. Four years later, it was ranked seventh globally among the most-watched videos of the 2010s decade.

=== Synopsis ===
The video was criticized for including a scene where Perry's character disintegrated a man (pictured), originally seen wearing a pendant appearing to display the Arabic word for "Allah", which was subsequently edited out of the video

During the video's opening, it is revealed that the music video takes place "a crazy long time ago" in Memphis, Egypt. For the opening verses, Perry's character Katy Pätra, the witch of Memphis, is shown wearing a white dress and white and blue wig while floating on a large barge at sunset, with pyramids and palm trees visible in the background. The video transitions to a different scene where Pätra, now wearing a longer dress and a black wig, sits in an extravagant Sphinx-like throne while pharaohs gather to bring her expensive gifts (such as a large diamond) in an attempt to "win her heart". After retrieving the first suitor's gift, she hits the man with a magical bolt of lightning from her hand, turning him into a pile of sand, and takes his jewels to wear on her teeth as a grill. Another suitor brings her candy, cupcakes, twinkies, and spicy cheese puffs. After she burns her mouth with the spicy cheese puffs, she turns the suitor into a large cup of water, which she drinks. Pätra also appears as a gray statue in a scene where golden pythons and gray guardian statues such as Anubis, Horus, Nisroch and Apep surround her, and in a scene with a blue background where she wears a golden dress and several golden hieroglyphs levitate around her. During Juicy J's verse, the rapper emerges from a gold sarcophagus while Pätra accepts an Egyptian chariot with hydraulics (she turns the associated suitor into a set of giant dice to hang from the frame) and rejects a suitor who turns out to have the face of a crocodile by turning him into a wallet. During the final chorus, the last suitor brings Pätra a large gold pyramid with a pink capstone, which she ascends. At the top of the pyramid, Pätra, dressed as Isis, uses her powers to conjure up a magical "perfect storm" with pink, purple, and violet clouds. Although it seems like Pätra has finally found a gift she likes, the final frame of the video reveals that she has turned the final suitor into a dog with a human head.

=== Reception ===
The music video was criticized by some for appropriating the symbols and imagery of Egyptian culture. Cullen, the director, defended the music video, saying that, while he believes it is dangerous to rip things directly from present cultures without adding anything to them, Ancient Egypt is part of what he calls our "shared collective mythology". He said: "The most important thing is that when you create something, and this is actually something Katy and I worked to do — you bring a new spin to it." Egyptologist David P. Silverman praised the music video's use of Egyptian imagery and the interest it could generate to viewers: "[Egypt has] always been a part of popular culture. It encourages people to think of these things, and some of those people actually begin to learn a lot." The video was noted by conspiracy theorists for bearing resemblance to imagery used by the alleged Illuminati, but Robert K. Ritner rejected the allegations, saying that "The many discussions of the Illuminati are nonsense" and that, in fact, the masonic imagery associated with the Illuminati is drawn from Egyptian imagery (as a common source for both).

==== Accusations of blasphemy ====
The music video caused controversy among Muslims who criticized a scene in the video where a man wearing a pendant appearing to display the Arabic word for "Allah" is disintegrated and turned into sand by Perry's character. The scene took place 1 minute and 15 seconds into the video. A petition launched on Change.org accused Perry of "representing an opposition of God" and demanded that the video be taken down from YouTube. The petition reached over 65,000 signatures and as a response, the pendant was digitally removed from the video on February 26, 2014, after which the petition was closed.

== Copyright infringement lawsuit ==
On July 1, 2014, the St. Louis Post-Dispatch reported that Christian rapper Flame and others filed a lawsuit against Perry, Capitol Records, and Perry's co-writers for infringing copyright on the song "Joyful Noise", which appeared on the 2008 album Our World: Redeemed. The producer, Chike Ojukwu, along with co-songwriter Da' T.R.U.T.H. were listed as co-plaintiffs. Cho'zyn Boy, a DJ for Flame in 2014, stated that Perry's song is "identical" to "Joyful Noise", but ten BPM slower in tempo and one step higher in pitch. In addition to the infringement claims, the suit claimed that "by any measure, the devoutly religious message of 'Joyful Noise' has been irreparably tarnished by its association with the witchcraft, paganism, black magic, and Illuminati imagery evoked by the same music in 'Dark Horse'". Rapper Lecrae, who is featured on the song and was initially included as a plaintiff in the lawsuit, clarified to MTV that "I was in Hong Kong [when] the press release went out and it's not my song — it's my guy Flame's song and I respect everyone's intellectual properties — but that statement about the witchcraft and stuff, that's not my statement and I don't stand behind that statement." To divest himself from the lawsuit, Lecrae signed over his rights to the song to Flame, Da' T.R.U.T.H., and Ojukwu for free.

In August 2018, Christina A. Snyder from the United States District Court for the Central District of California ruled against a summary judgment, arguing that the plaintiffs "demonstrated a triable issue of fact as to access because 'Joyful Noise' achieved critical success, including a Grammy nomination, and was readily available and viewed millions of times on YouTube and MySpace." She also deferred to the arguments of musicologist Todd Decker, who claimed that the songs share "five or six points of similarity"; specifically, the ostinatos in both songs are either identical or nearly so in their phrase length, rhythm, pitch content, and timbre. Perry and Dr. Luke countered with their own expert testimony from musicologist Lawrence Ferrara that the commonalities between the two songs are merely generic elements. During the federal trial in July 2019, Perry, Dr. Luke, and Max Martin testified that they had never heard "Joyful Noise", and that of the trillions of videos uploaded to YouTube between 2009 and 2013, and their defense team attempted to demonstrate that "Joyful Noise" was not widely accessible to audiences. The lawyer for Flame and the other plaintiffs noted that Perry in the early 2000s started her career in Christian pop, to which Perry replied that even during that part of her career she was "mostly always listening to ... secular music anyway".

Ferrara argued that "Dark Horse" contains elements common to countless songs, including the much older songs "Mary Had a Little Lamb", "Jolly Old St. Nicholas", and "Merrily We Roll Along". Decker claimed that the descending melodies of each ostinato are unique and that he had not "seen another piece that descends in the way these two do." The attorney for Perry and fellow defendants accused Flame and the other plaintiffs of "trying to own basic building blocks of music, the alphabet of music that should be available to everyone." Another argument from Perry and the other defendants was that because Ojukwu never registered the beat he produced and later licensed it to Flame, "Joyful Noise" was itself a derivative work. When Perry testified before the court, initially technical difficulties prevented her lawyers from playing "Dark Horse" in the courtroom, and Perry joked "I could perform it for you live." On July 29, 2019, a federal jury found that Perry, Juicy J, Dr. Luke, Max Martin, Cirkut, and Sarah Hudson were guilty of infringement, along with Capitol Records, Warner Bros. Music Publishing, Kobalt Publishing, and Kasz Money Inc. The jury awarded the plaintiffs $2.78 million, of which Perry herself was ordered to pay $550,000.

Perry and the other defendants moved for judgment as a matter of law. While the motion was under consideration, in early March 2020, the Ninth Circuit (of which the Central District of California is a part of) issued a ruling in a similar long-running lawsuit on whether Led Zeppelin's "Stairway to Heaven" violated the copyright of the song "Taurus" from the band Spirit. In its ruling, the Ninth found that "Stairway" did not violate the copyright of "Taurus", specifically overturning its "inverse ratio rule" which it had used in several previous cases. Perry's lawyers took this ruling as part of their appeal to Judge Snyder. On March 17, 2020, Judge Snyder overturned the jury award, citing numerous factors, including that the evidence given did not support the jury's award, and of the recent Ninth Circuit judgement. Snyder wrote "A relatively common 8-note combination of unprotected elements that happens to be played in a timbre common to a particular genre of music cannot be so original as to warrant copyright protection". Snyder vacated the jury's verdict and denied motions for a new trial, though stated that should the case be heard on appeal at the Ninth Circuit, that a new jury trial would be required. The Ninth Circuit ruled 3–0 in March 2022 to affirm Snyder's decision in Perry's favor, stating that "Allowing a copyright over this material would essentially amount to allowing an improper monopoly over two-note pitch sequences or even the minor scale itself."

== Live performances ==
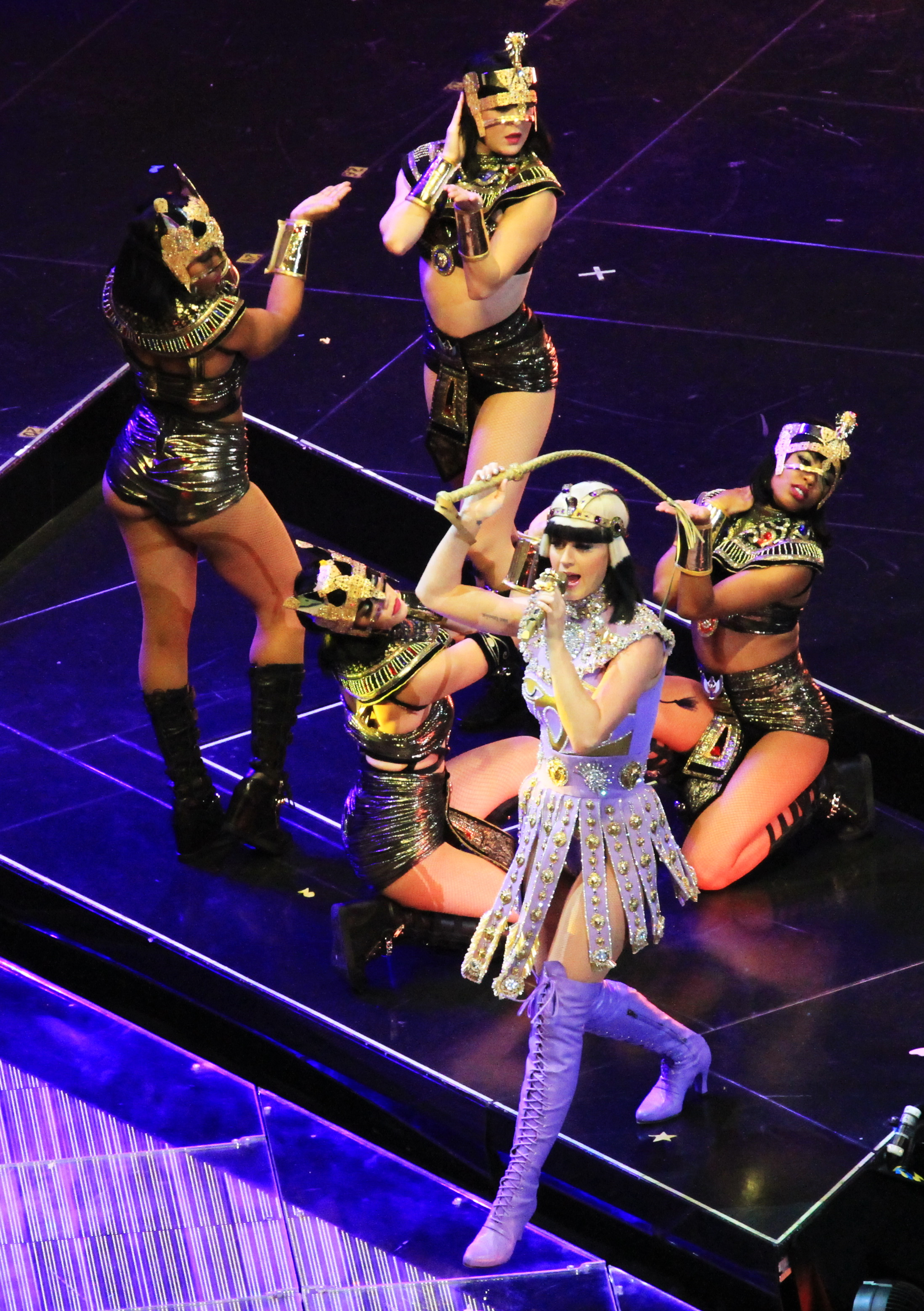
Perry performing "Dark Horse" at The Prismatic World Tour

"Dark Horse" was first performed at the iHeartRadio Music Festival in Las Vegas on September 20, 2013. It was later performed at the iTunes Festival in London. Perry also performed the song with Juicy J at the We Can Survive event at the Hollywood Bowl on October 23. Perry also performed "Dark Horse" on The Voice of Germany on December 13, 2013. Perry and Juicy J performed the song at the 56th Annual Grammy Awards on January 26, 2014. The "dark and mysterious" performance featured a "haunted forest" design with animatronic horses, broomstick pole dances, and a controlled fire. The singer also performed the song at the 2014 BRIT Awards and the performance featured a neon-colored Egyptian theme, like the music video.

On February 1, 2015, the song was performed by Perry during the Super Bowl XLIX halftime show, where she was on a chessboard, with her dancers as chess pieces. It is regarded as the most technical performance in her halftime set.

On January 17, 2026, Perry performed "Dark Horse" on Joy Awards 2026 that took place in Saudi Arabia alongside Firework and Roar.

== Use in media ==
The song is used as the theme music for The Face Vietnam season 3.

== Formats and track listings ==
- Digital download – Japan version
1. "Dark Horse" (featuring TEE) – 3:35
- CD single
1. "Dark Horse" – 3:35
2. "Dark Horse" (Johnson Somerset Remix) – 9:01

== Credits and personnel ==
Credits adapted from Prism album liner notes.

- Katy Perry – lead vocals, backing vocals, songwriter
- Juicy J – featured vocals, backing vocals, songwriter
- Sarah Hudson – songwriter
- Dr. Luke – producer, songwriter
- Max Martin – producer, songwriter
- Cirkut – producer, songwriter

== Charts ==
=== Weekly charts ===
Weekly chart performance
Chart (2013–2014)	Peak position
Australia Digital Tracks (ARIA)	5
Austria (Ö3 Austria Top 40)	2
Belgium (Ultratop 50 Flanders)	1
Belgium (Ultratop 50 Wallonia)	3
Bulgaria Airplay (BAMP)	1
Brazil (Billboard Brasil Hot 100)	18
Brazil Hot Pop Songs	4
Canada Hot 100 (Billboard)	1
Canada AC (Billboard)	7
Canada CHR/Top 40 (Billboard)	1
Canada Hot AC (Billboard)	2
CIS Airplay (TopHit)	32
Colombia Airplay (National-Report)	10
Czech Republic Airplay (ČNS IFPI)	2
Czech Republic Singles Digital (ČNS IFPI)	4
Denmark (Tracklisten)	6
Euro Digital Song Sales (Billboard)	3
Finland Download (Latauslista)	5
France (SNEP)	6
Germany (GfK)	6
Greece Digital Songs (Billboard)	4
Hong Kong (HKRIA)	12
Hungary (Single Top 40)	8
Hungary (Rádiós Top 40)	27
Ireland (IRMA)	3
Israel International Airplay (Media Forest)	4
Italy (FIMI)	5
Japan Hot 100 (Billboard)	91
Lebanon (The Official Lebanese Top 20)	14
Luxembourg Digital Song Sales (Billboard)	1
Mexico Anglo (Monitor Latino)	4
Netherlands (Dutch Top 40)	1
Netherlands (Single Top 100)	1
New Zealand (Recorded Music NZ)	2
Norway (VG-lista)	2
Poland Airplay (ZPAV)	1
Portugal Digital Song Sales (Billboard)	10
Romania (Airplay 100)	3
Romania TV Airplay (Media Forest)	1
Russia Airplay (TopHit)	26
Scottish Singles Sales (Official Charts)	3
Slovakia Airplay (ČNS IFPI)	16
Slovakia Singles Digital (ČNS IFPI)	11
Slovenia (SloTop50)	24
South Africa Airplay (EMA)	5
Spain (Promusicae)	9
Sweden (Sverigetopplistan)	2
Switzerland (Schweizer Hitparade)	4
Turkey (Number One Top 20)	5
Ukraine Airplay (TopHit)	45
UK Singles (Official Charts)	4
UK Streaming Chart	3
US Billboard Hot 100	1
US Adult Contemporary (Billboard)	6
US Adult Pop Airplay (Billboard)	2
US Dance Club Songs (Billboard)	1
US Dance Airplay (Billboard)	2
US Latin Pop Airplay (Billboard)	16
US Pop Airplay (Billboard)	1
US R&B/Hip-Hop Airplay (Billboard)	12
US Rhythmic Airplay (Billboard)	1
Venezuela Pop Rock (Record Report)	2

Weekly chart performance
Chart (2022)	Peak position
Global 200 (Billboard)	147

Weekly chart performance
Chart (2026)	Peak position
Russia Streaming (TopHit)	66

=== Monthly charts ===
Monthly chart performance
Chart (2014)	Peak position
Russia Airplay (TopHit)	33
Ukraine Airplay (TopHit)	65

Monthly chart performance
Chart (2026)	Position
Russia Streaming (TopHit)	84

=== Year-end charts ===
Year-end chart performance
Chart (2013)	Position
Australia Streaming (ARIA)	68
New Zealand (Recorded Music NZ)	28

Year-end chart performance
Chart (2014)	Position
Australia Digital Tracks (ARIA)	53
Austria (Ö3 Austria Top 40)	16
Belgium (Ultratop 50 Flanders)	10
Belgium (Ultratop 50 Wallonia)	15
Brazil (Crowley)	41
Canada (Canadian Hot 100)	6
CIS Airplay (TopHit)	60
Denmark (Tracklisten)	16
France (SNEP)	30
Germany (Official German Charts)	11
Hungary (Single Top 40)	35
Israel (Media Forest)	34
Italy (FIMI)	17
Netherlands (Dutch Top 40)	10
Netherlands (Single Top 100)	26
New Zealand (Recorded Music NZ)	31
Poland (ZPAV)	26
Romania (Airplay 100)	19
Russia Airplay (TopHit)	50
Spain (PROMUSICAE)	41
Sweden (Sverigetopplistan)	16
Switzerland (Schweizer Hitparade)	17
Ukraine Airplay (TopHit)	167
UK Singles (Official Charts)	20
US Billboard Hot 100	2
US Adult Contemporary (Billboard)	19
US Adult Top 40 (Billboard)	9
US Dance Club Songs (Billboard)	8
US Dance/Mix Show Airplay (Billboard)	18
US Mainstream Top 40 (Billboard)	1
US Rhythmic (Billboard)	5
Worldwide (IFPI)	2

Year-end chart performance
Chart (2015)	Position
CIS (TopHit)	111
Russia Airplay (TopHit)	104

=== Decade-end charts ===
Decade-end chart performance
Chart (2010–2019)	Position
US Billboard Hot 100	26

=== All-time charts ===
All-time chart performance
Chart (1958–2018)	Position
US Billboard Hot 100 (Women)	33
US Billboard Greatest of All Time Pop Songs	23
US Billboard Hot 100 Songs of the 21st Century	48

== Certifications and sales ==
Certifications and sales
Region	Certification	Certified units/sales
Australia (ARIA)	13× Platinum	910,000^{‡}
Austria (IFPI Austria)	2× Platinum	60,000^{*}
Belgium (BRMA)	Gold	15,000^{*}
Brazil (Pro-Música Brasil)	8× Diamond	2,000,000^{‡}
Canada (Music Canada)	Diamond	800,000^{‡}
Finland	8× Platinum	32,000
France (SNEP)	Diamond	333,333^{‡}
Germany (BVMI)	3× Gold	450,000^{‡}
Italy (FIMI)	3× Platinum	90,000^{‡}
Mexico (AMPROFON)	2× Platinum	120,000^{*}
New Zealand (RMNZ)	5× Platinum	150,000^{‡}
Norway (IFPI Norway)	5× Platinum	300,000^{‡}
Portugal (AFP)	Gold	10,000^{‡}
South Korea	—	10,418 (Note: South Korea sales figures as of October 2013.)
Spain (Promusicae)	2× Platinum	120,000^{‡}
Sweden (GLF)	4× Platinum	160,000^{‡}
United Kingdom (BPI)	3× Platinum	1,800,000^{‡}
United States (RIAA)	11× Platinum	11,000,000^{‡}
Streaming
Denmark (IFPI Danmark)	2× Platinum	5,200,000^{†}
Greece (IFPI Greece)	Platinum	2,000,000^{†}
Spain (Promusicae)	Platinum	8,000,000^{†}
Summaries
Worldwide	—	13,200,000 (Note: Worldwide sales figures as of December 2014.)
^{*} Sales figures based on certification alone.^{‡} Sales+streaming figures based on certification alone.^{†} Streaming-only figures based on certification alone.

== Release history ==
Release dates and formats
Country	Date	Format	Label	Ref.
Various	September 17, 2013 (Note: Release as a promotional single.)	Digital download	Capitol	
United States	December 17, 2013	Contemporary hit radio	Capitol	
United States	December 17, 2013	Rhythmic contemporary radio	Capitol	
France	January 6, 2014	Radio airplay	Universal	
Italy	February 14, 2014	Radio airplay	Universal	
Germany	February 28, 2014	CD	Capitol	
United States	March 11, 2014	Urban contemporary radio	Capitol	
United States	September 4, 2015	Digital download	Capitol	

== See also ==
- List of Billboard Hot 100 number-one singles of 2014
- List of Billboard Hot 100 top 10 singles in 2014
- List of Dutch Top 40 number-one singles of 2014
- List of Billboard Hot 100 number-one singles of the 2010s
- List of Canadian Hot 100 number-one singles of 2014
- List of Billboard Mainstream Top 40 number-one songs of 2014
- List of number-one Billboard Streaming Songs of 2014
- List of number-one dance singles of 2014 (U.S.)
- List of number-one digital songs of 2014 (U.S.)
- List of number-one singles of 2014 (Poland)
- List of top 10 singles in 2014 (France)
- List of UK top-ten singles in 2014
- List of highest-certified singles in Australia
- List of best-selling singles in Brazil
