= List of Billboard Mainstream Top 40 number-one songs of 2014 =

This is a list of songs that reached number one on the Billboard Mainstream Top 40 (Pop Songs) chart in 2014.

During 2014, a total of 20 singles hit number-one on the charts.

== Chart history ==
Key
| † | Indicates best-performing single of 2014 |

| Issue date | Song | Artist(s) | Ref. |
|---|---|---|---|
| January 4 | "The Monster" | Eminem featuring Rihanna | |
| January 11 | "The Monster" | Eminem featuring Rihanna | |
| January 18 | "The Monster" | Eminem featuring Rihanna | |
| January 25 | "Counting Stars" | OneRepublic | |
| February 1 | "Timber" | Pitbull featuring Ke$ha | |
| February 8 | "Timber" | Pitbull featuring Ke$ha | |
| February 15 | "Timber" | Pitbull featuring Ke$ha | |
| February 22 | "Dark Horse" † | Katy Perry featuring Juicy J | |
| March 1 | "Dark Horse" † | Katy Perry featuring Juicy J | |
| March 8 | "Dark Horse" † | Katy Perry featuring Juicy J | |
| March 15 | "Dark Horse" † | Katy Perry featuring Juicy J | |
| March 22 | "Dark Horse" † | Katy Perry featuring Juicy J | |
| March 29 | "Happy" | Pharrell Williams | |
| April 5 | "Happy" | Pharrell Williams | |
| April 12 | "Happy" | Pharrell Williams | |
| April 19 | "Happy" | Pharrell Williams | |
| April 26 | "Talk Dirty" | Jason Derulo featuring 2 Chainz | |
| May 3 | "All of Me" | John Legend | |
| May 10 | "All of Me" | John Legend | |
| May 17 | "All of Me" | John Legend | |
| May 24 | "All of Me" | John Legend | |
| May 31 | "All of Me" | John Legend | |
| June 7 | "Not a Bad Thing" | Justin Timberlake | |
| June 14 | "Not a Bad Thing" | Justin Timberlake | |
| June 21 | "Fancy" | Iggy Azalea featuring Charli XCX | |
| June 28 | "Fancy" | Iggy Azalea featuring Charli XCX | |
| July 5 | "Fancy" | Iggy Azalea featuring Charli XCX | |
| July 12 | "Problem" | Ariana Grande featuring Iggy Azalea | |
| July 19 | "Problem" | Ariana Grande featuring Iggy Azalea | |
| July 26 | "Am I Wrong" | Nico & Vinz | |
| August 2 | "Am I Wrong" | Nico & Vinz | |
| August 9 | "Rude" | MAGIC! | |
| August 16 | "Rude" | MAGIC! | |
| August 23 | "Rude" | MAGIC! | |
| August 30 | "Stay With Me" | Sam Smith | |
| September 6 | "Stay With Me" | Sam Smith | |
| September 13 | "Boom Clap" | Charli XCX | |
| September 20 | "Boom Clap" | Charli XCX | |
| September 27 | "Boom Clap" | Charli XCX | |
| October 4 | "All About That Bass" | Meghan Trainor | |
| October 11 | "All About That Bass" | Meghan Trainor | |
| October 18 | "All About That Bass" | Meghan Trainor | |
| October 25 | "Shake It Off" | Taylor Swift | |
| November 1 | "Black Widow" | Iggy Azalea featuring Rita Ora | |
| November 8 | "Shake It Off" | Taylor Swift | |
| November 15 | "Habits (Stay High)" | Tove Lo | |
| November 22 | "Habits (Stay High)" | Tove Lo | |
| November 29 | "Animals" | Maroon 5 | |
| December 6 | "Animals" | Maroon 5 | |
| December 13 | "Animals" | Maroon 5 | |
| December 20 | "Animals" | Maroon 5 | |
| December 27 | "Blank Space" | Taylor Swift | |

== See also ==
- 2014 in American music
