= List of Billboard Hot 100 number ones of 2014 =

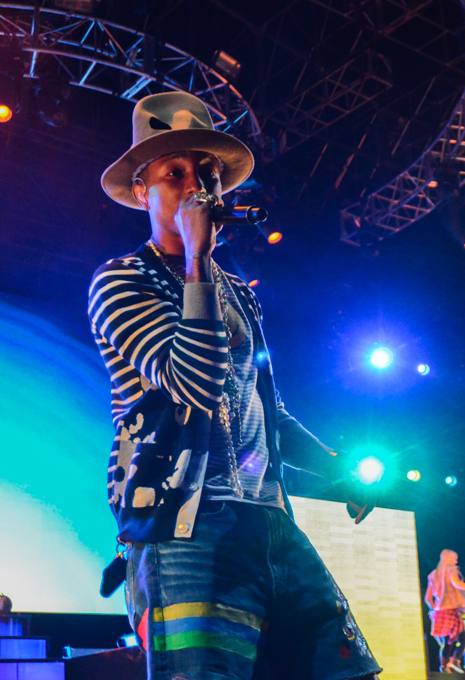
"Happy" by Pharrell Williams (pictured) spent ten weeks at number one on the Hot 100, the longest of any single in 2014. It later ranked as the best-performing single of the year.

The Billboard Hot 100 is a chart that ranks the best-performing singles of the United States. Its data, published by Billboard magazine and compiled by Nielsen SoundScan, is based collectively on each single's weekly physical and digital sales, as well as airplay and streaming.

During 2014, nine singles reached number one on the Hot 100; a tenth single, "The Monster" by Eminem featuring Rihanna, began its run at number one in December 2013. Of those ten number-one singles, four were collaborations. In total, thirteen acts topped the chart as either lead or featured artists, with six—Juicy J, John Legend, Iggy Azalea, Charli XCX, Magic! and Meghan Trainor—achieving their first Hot 100 number-one single. Pharrell Williams' "Happy" was the longest-running number-one of the year, leading the chart for ten weeks; it subsequently topped the Billboard Year-End Hot 100.

In May, Legend's "All of Me" reached number one in its thirtieth week on the Hot 100, earning the distinction of the third-longest ascent to number one after Los del Río's "Macarena" and Lonestar's "Amazed". The song also became the third number-one to feature only piano and vocals, following Adele's "Someone like You" and Bruno Mars' "When I Was Your Man". Azalea became the fourth solo female rapper to top the chart when "Fancy" reached number one in June, a feat previously achieved only by Lauryn Hill, Lil' Kim and Shawnna. In its sixth of seven weeks on top, "Fancy" became the longest-reigning single by a female rapper on the chart.

Taylor Swift's "Blank Space" reached number one in November, ending the run of Swift's own "Shake It Off". In doing so, Swift became the first female artist in the history of the Hot 100, and tenth act overall, to replace herself at the top of the chart. With "Shake It Off" and "Blank Space", Swift was also the only artist to notch multiple number-ones in 2014.

2014 was also the first year in 18 years to have all of its number-one singles that topped the chart that year enter the decade-end top 100 in the 2010s, after all of the number-one songs from 1996 made the decade-end top 100 of the 1990s. (The Monster did not make the decade-end top 100, but started its peak position in 2013.)

== Chart history ==
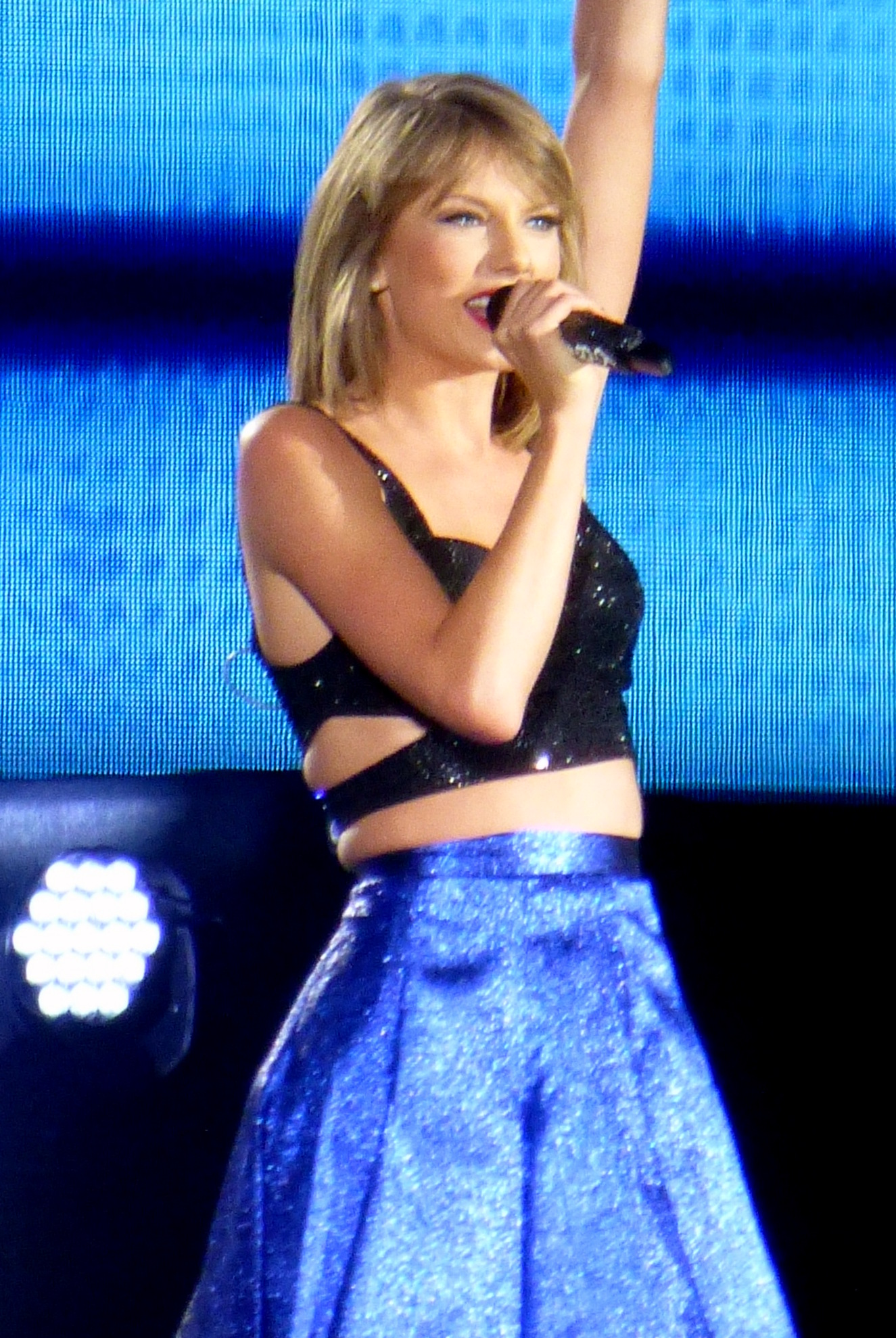
Taylor Swift became the first woman to replace herself at number-one after "Blank Space" dethroned "Shake It Off" from the top spot.

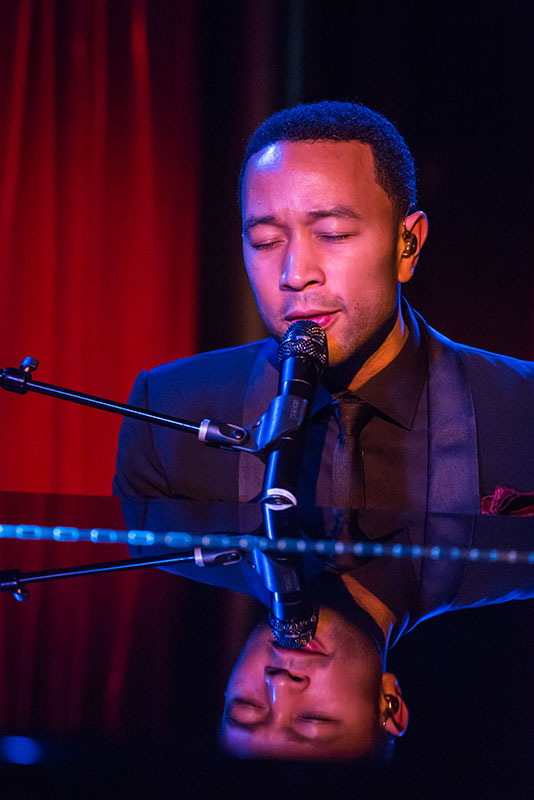
John Legend earned his first number-one with "All of Me" after a thirty-week climb to the top, the third-longest of any song in Hot 100 history.

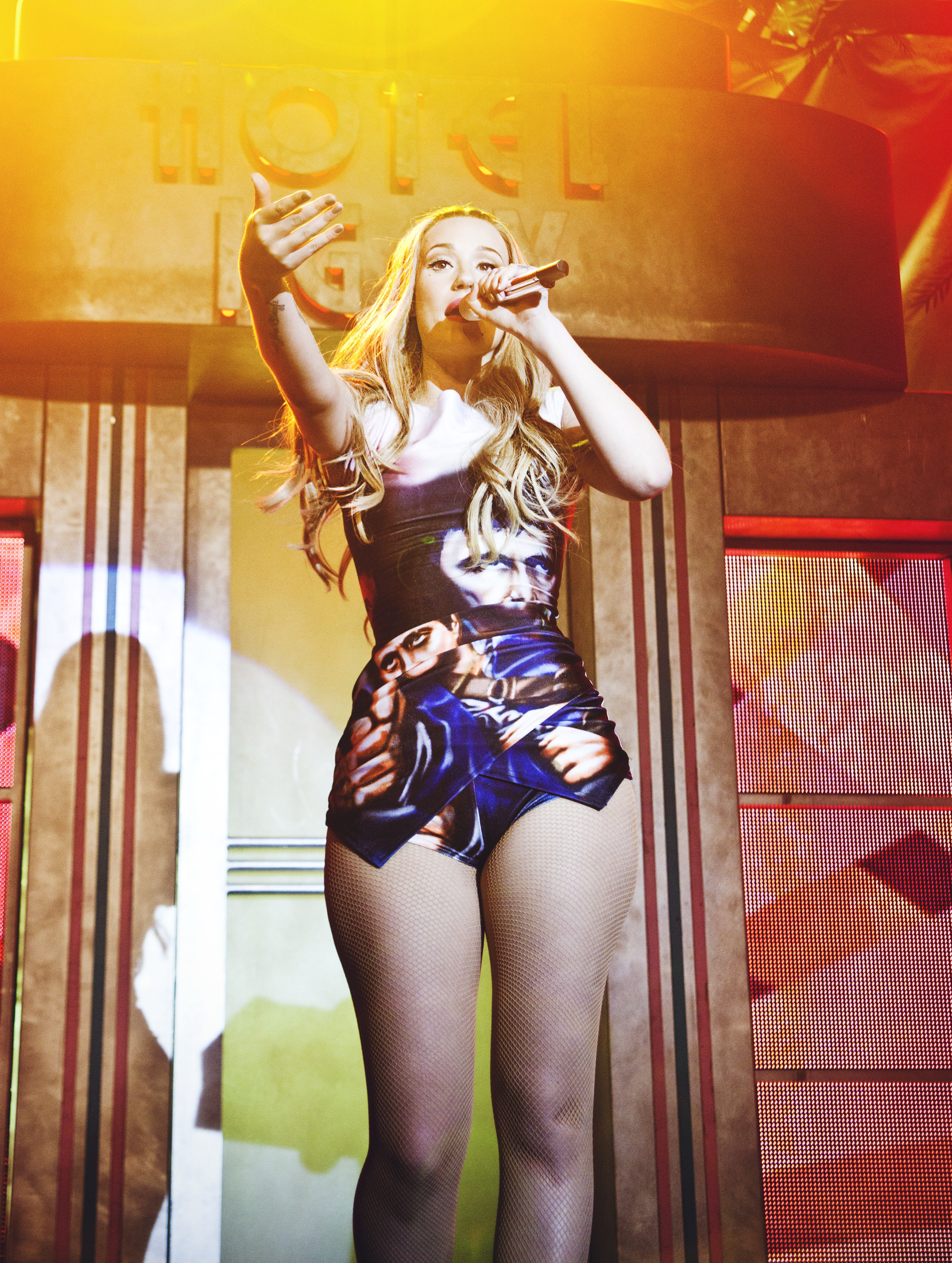
In its sixth week on top, "Fancy" by Iggy Azalea (pictured) featuring Charli XCX became the longest-reigning number-one single by a female rapper.

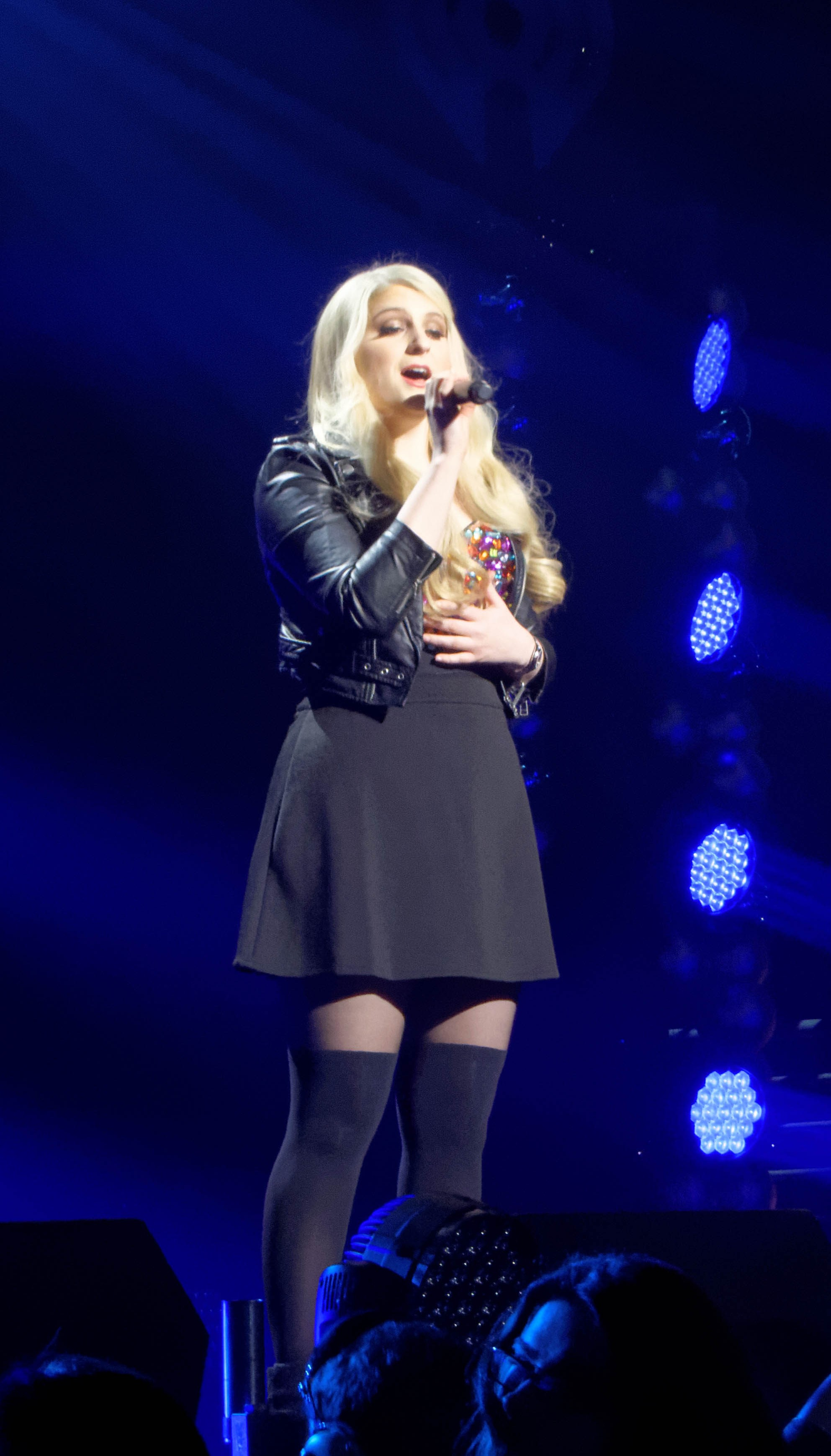
Meghan Trainor earned her first number-one with her debut single "All About That Bass", which led the Hot 100 for eight weeks.

Key
†	Indicates best-performing single of 2014

No.	Issue date	Song	Artist(s)	Ref.
1031	January 4	"The Monster"	Eminem featuring Rihanna	
1031	January 11	"The Monster"	Eminem featuring Rihanna	
1032	January 18	"Timber"	Pitbull featuring Kesha	
1032	January 25	"Timber"	Pitbull featuring Kesha	
1032	February 1	"Timber"	Pitbull featuring Kesha	
1033	February 8	"Dark Horse"	Katy Perry featuring Juicy J	
1033	February 15	"Dark Horse"	Katy Perry featuring Juicy J	
1033	February 22	"Dark Horse"	Katy Perry featuring Juicy J	
1033	March 1	"Dark Horse"	Katy Perry featuring Juicy J	
1034	March 8	"Happy" †	Pharrell Williams	
1034	March 15	"Happy" †	Pharrell Williams	
1034	March 22	"Happy" †	Pharrell Williams	
1034	March 29	"Happy" †	Pharrell Williams	
1034	April 5	"Happy" †	Pharrell Williams	
1034	April 12	"Happy" †	Pharrell Williams	
1034	April 19	"Happy" †	Pharrell Williams	
1034	April 26	"Happy" †	Pharrell Williams	
1034	May 3	"Happy" †	Pharrell Williams	
1034	May 10	"Happy" †	Pharrell Williams	
1035	May 17	"All of Me"	John Legend	
1035	May 24	"All of Me"	John Legend	
1035	May 31	"All of Me"	John Legend	
1036	June 7	"Fancy"	Iggy Azalea featuring Charli XCX	
1036	June 14	"Fancy"	Iggy Azalea featuring Charli XCX	
1036	June 21	"Fancy"	Iggy Azalea featuring Charli XCX	
1036	June 28	"Fancy"	Iggy Azalea featuring Charli XCX	
1036	July 5	"Fancy"	Iggy Azalea featuring Charli XCX	
1036	July 12	"Fancy"	Iggy Azalea featuring Charli XCX	
1036	July 19	"Fancy"	Iggy Azalea featuring Charli XCX	
1037	July 26	"Rude"	Magic!	
1037	August 2	"Rude"	Magic!	
1037	August 9	"Rude"	Magic!	
1037	August 16	"Rude"	Magic!	
1037	August 23	"Rude"	Magic!	
1037	August 30	"Rude"	Magic!	
1038	September 6	"Shake It Off"	Taylor Swift	
1038	September 13	"Shake It Off"	Taylor Swift	
1039	September 20	"All About That Bass"	Meghan Trainor	
1039	September 27	"All About That Bass"	Meghan Trainor	
1039	October 4	"All About That Bass"	Meghan Trainor	
1039	October 11	"All About That Bass"	Meghan Trainor	
1039	October 18	"All About That Bass"	Meghan Trainor	
1039	October 25	"All About That Bass"	Meghan Trainor	
1039	November 1	"All About That Bass"	Meghan Trainor	
1039	November 8	"All About That Bass"	Meghan Trainor	
re	November 15	"Shake It Off"	Taylor Swift	
re	November 22	"Shake It Off"	Taylor Swift	
1040	November 29	"Blank Space"	Taylor Swift	
1040	December 6	"Blank Space"	Taylor Swift	
1040	December 13	"Blank Space"	Taylor Swift	
1040	December 20	"Blank Space"	Taylor Swift	
1040	December 27	"Blank Space"	Taylor Swift	

== Number-one artists ==
List of number-one artists by total weeks at number one
Position	Artist	Weeks at No. 1
1	Pharrell Williams	10
2	Taylor Swift	9
3	Meghan Trainor	8
4	Iggy Azalea	7
4	Charli XCX	7
6	Magic!	6
7	Katy Perry	4
7	Juicy J	4
9	Pitbull	3
9	Kesha	3
9	John Legend	3
12	Eminem	2
12	Rihanna	2

== See also ==
- 2014 in American music
- List of Billboard 200 number-one albums of 2014
- List of Billboard Hot 100 top-ten singles in 2014
- List of Billboard Hot 100 number-one singles of the 2010s
