= K Camp discography =

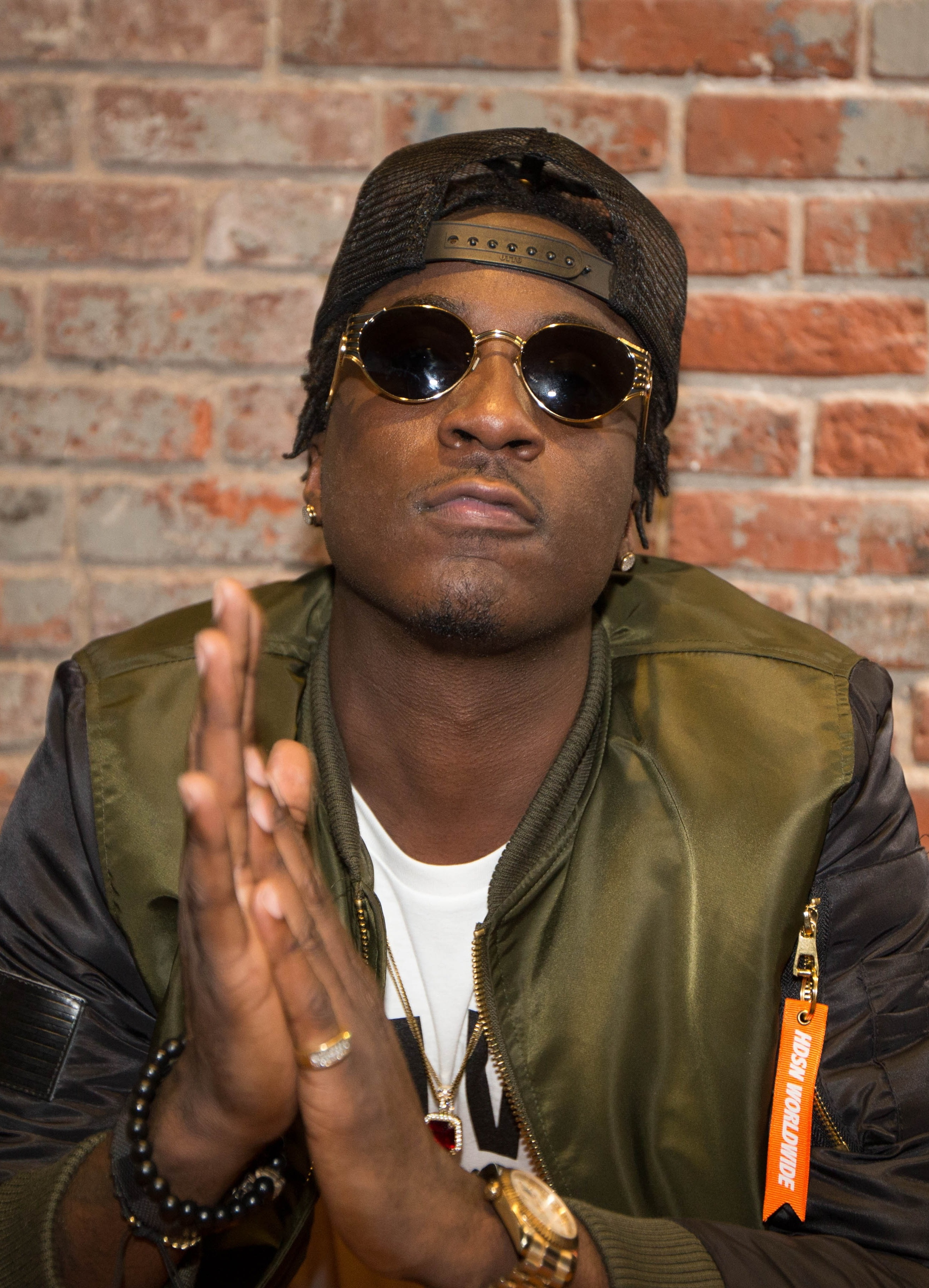
- Studio albums: 7
- EPs: 3
- Singles: 23
- Mixtapes: 13

This is the discography for American hip hop musician K Camp. It consists of seven studio albums, three extended plays, thirteen mixtapes, and twenty-three singles (including eight a featured artist).

== Albums ==
=== Studio albums ===
List of albums, with selected chart positions
| Title | Album details | Peak chart positions | | |
| Title | Album details | US | US R&B/HH | US Rap |
|---|---|---|---|---|
| Only Way Is Up | Released: September 4, 2015; Label: Interscope Records; Format: CD, Digital download | 20 | 5 | 4 |
| RARE Sound | Released: November 2, 2018; Label: RARE Sound, Interscope Records, Empire; Format: Digital download | — | — | — |
| Wayy 2 Kritical | Released: June 21, 2019; Label: RARE Sound, Interscope Records, Empire; Format: Digital download, streaming | — | — | — |
| Kiss Five | Released: April 24, 2020; Label: RARE Sound, Interscope Records, Empire; Format: Digital download, streaming | 29 | 18 | 13 |
| Rare Family | Released: July 3, 2020; Label: RARE Sound, Interscope Records, Empire; Format: Digital download, streaming | — | — | — |
| Float | Released: August 13, 2021; Label: RARE Sound, Interscope Records, Empire; Format: Digital download, streaming | 122 | — | — |
| Vibe Forever | Released: July 29, 2022; Label: RARE Sound, Interscope Records, Empire; Format: Digital download, streaming | — | — | — |
| Float 2 London | Released: January 12, 2024; Label: RARE Sound, Interscope Records, Empire; Format: Digital download, streaming | — | — | — |
| Built Different | Released: March 14, 2025; Label: RARE Sound, Interscope Records, Empire; Format: Digital download, streaming | — | — | — |
"—" denotes a title that did not chart, or was not released in that territory.

=== Extended plays ===
List of EPs, with selected chart positions
| Title | Album details | Peak chart positions | | |
| Title | Album details | US R&B/HH | US Rap | US Heat |
|---|---|---|---|---|
| In Due Time | Released: April 22, 2014; Label: Interscope Records; Format: Digital download | 37 | 21 | 11 |
| Lyric Ave | Released: September 2, 2016; Label: Interscope Records; Format: Digital download | 26 | 18 | — |
| This For You | Released: July 31, 2018; Label: Interscope Records; Format: Digital download | — | — | — |
"—" denotes a title that did not chart, or was not released in that territory.

=== Mixtapes ===
| Mixtape title | Album details |
|---|---|
| Become A Fan | Released: April 28, 2011; Label: Interscope Records; Format:Digital download |
| Fan4Life | Released: April 27, 2012; Label: Interscope Records; Format: Digital download |
| Show Money (with Tha Joker) | Released: June 11, 2013; Label: Interscope Records; Format: Digital download |
| Workahollics (with Sy Ari Da Kid) | Released: October 22, 2013; Label: Interscope Records; Format: Digital download |
| K.I.S.S. | Released: January 3, 2014; Label: Interscope Records; Format: Digital download |
| K.I.S.S. 2 | Released: February 11, 2014; Label: Interscope Records; Format: Digital download |
| SlumLords | Released: June 12, 2014; Label: Interscope Records; Format: Digital download |
| One Way | Released: January 19, 2015; Label: Interscope Records; Format: Digital download |
| You Welcome | Released: November 11, 2015; Label: Interscope Records; Format: Digital download |
| K.I.S.S. 3 | Released: April 26, 2016; Label: Interscope Records; Format: Digital download |
| Rare | Released: February 14, 2017; Label: Interscope Records; Format: Digital download |
| K.I.S.S. 4 | Released: March 8, 2017; Label: Interscope Records; Format: Digital download |
| Slum Lords 2 | Released: October 27, 2017; Label: Interscope Records; Format: Digital download |

== Singles ==
=== As lead artist ===
List of singles, with selected chart positions, showing year released and album name
| Title | Year | Peak chart positions | | | | | Certifications | Album |
| Title | Year | US | US R&B/HH | US Rap | ARG | CAN | Certifications | Album |
|---|---|---|---|---|---|---|---|---|
| "All the Way Down" | 2012 | — | — | — | — | — | | Fan4Life |
| "Money Baby" (featuring Kwony Cash) | 2013 | — (Note: "Money Baby" did not chart on the Billboard Hot 100, but peaked at number eight on the Bubbling Under Hot 100 chart.) | 31 | 20 | — | — | RIAA: Platinum | In Due Time |
| "Cut Her Off" (featuring 2 Chainz) | 2013 | 49 | 11 | 5 | — | — | RIAA: Platinum | In Due Time |
| "Blessing" | 2014 | — | — | — | — | — | | In Due Time |
| "Turn Up for a Check" (featuring Yo Gotti) | 2014 | — | — | — | — | — | | In Due Time |
| "Lil Bit" | 2015 | — (Note: "Lil Bit" did not chart on the Billboard Hot 100, but peaked at number one on the Bubbling Under Hot 100 chart.) | 32 | 21 | — | — | RIAA: Gold | Only Way Is Up |
| "Comfortable" | 2015 | 54 | 19 | 14 | — | — | RIAA: 2× Platinum | Only Way Is Up |
| "1Hunnid" (featuring Fetty Wap) | 2015 | — (Note: "1Hunnid" did not chart on the Billboard Hot 100, but peaked at number 13 on the Bubbling Under Hot 100 chart.) | 36 | 24 | — | — | RIAA: Platinum | Only Way Is Up |
| "5 Minutes" (featuring 2 Chainz) | 2016 | — | — | — | — | — | | Non-album singles |
| "Good Problem" | 2017 | — | — | — | — | — | | Non-album singles |
| "Racks Like This" (featuring Moneybagg Yo) | 2018 | — | — | — | — | — | | Slum Lords 2 |
| "His & Hers" | 2018 | — | — | — | — | — | | Wayy 2 Kritical |
| "Switch" | 2019 | — | — | — | — | — | | Wayy 2 Kritical |
| "Lottery" | 2019 | — (Note: "Lottery" did not chart on the Billboard Hot 100, but peaked at number 15 on the Bubbling Under Hot 100 chart.) | — | — | 65 | 40 | RIAA: Platinum | Wayy 2 Kritical & Kiss Five |
| "Ice Cold" | 2019 | — | — | — | — | — | | Kiss Five |
| "Black Men Don't Cheat" | 2020 | — | — | — | — | — | | Kiss Five |
| "What's on Your Mind" (featuring Jacquees) | 2020 | — (Note: "What's On Your Mind" did not chart on the Billboard Hot 100, but peaked at number 17 on the Bubbling Under Hot 100 chart.) | 42 | — | — | — | RIAA: Gold | Kiss Five |
| Spin the Block | 2023 | — | — | — | — | — | | TBA |
"—" denotes a recording that did not chart or was not released in that territory.

=== As featured artist ===
List of singles, with selected chart positions, showing year released and album name
| Title | Year | Peak chart positions | | Album |
| Title | Year | US | US R&B/HH | Album |
|---|---|---|---|---|
| "Made Me" (Snootie Wild featuring K Camp) | 2014 | 93 | 25 | Go Mode |
| "Show 'Em" (Lil Boosie featuring Webbie, Wankaego and K Camp) | 2014 | — | — | Non-album single |
| "All I Know" (E-40 featuring K Camp and Casey Veggies) | 2016 | — | — | The D-Boy Diary: Book 2 |
| "Seal" (Berner featuring Wiz Khalifa & K Camp, Eugenius) | 2016 | — | — | Hempire |
| "It Could Be Worse" (J. Stalin featuring K Camp) | 2016 | — | — | On Behalf of the Streets 2 |
| "What's Up" (Curren$y featuring K Camp) | 2016 | — | — | Canal Street Confidential |
| "Trash Bags" (Snoop Dogg featuring K Camp) | 2017 | — | — | Neva Left |
| "Yes!" (Kyle featuring Rich The Kid and K Camp) | 2020 | — | — | See You When I am Famous |
"—" denotes a recording that did not chart or was not released in that territory.
