= Made Me =

Single by Snootie Wild featuring K Camp

from the EP Go Mode
- Released: July 15, 2014
- Recorded: 2014
- Genre: Hip hop
- Length: 3:14
- Label: Collective Music Group; Epic
- Songwriters: LePreston Porter; Kristopher Campell; Leland Clopton
- Producer: Big Fruit

Snootie Wild singles chronology
"Yayo" (2014)	"Made Me" (2014)	"Rich or Not" (2014)

K Camp singles chronology
"Cut Her Off" (2013)	"Made Me" (2014)	"Comfortable" (2015)

"Made Me" is a song by American hip hop recording artist Snootie Wild. It was released as a single on July 15, 2014, as the second single from Wild's debut EP, Go Mode (2014). The song, produced by Big Fruit, features vocals from American rapper K Camp. "Made Me" peaked at number 93 on the Billboard Hot 100, making it Wild's only Hot 100 entry during his lifetime.

== Music video ==
A music video for the track was released on August 20, 2014 via Wild's VEVO channel. It was directed by Motion Family.

== Remix ==
A remix version was released and features K Camp, Jeremih and Boosie Badazz.

== Chart performance ==
Chart (2014)	Peak position
US Billboard Hot 100	93
US Hot R&B/Hip-Hop Songs (Billboard)	38

== Release history ==
Region	Date	Format	Record label
United States	July 15, 2014	Urban contemporary	CMG; Epic Records
United Kingdom	July 22, 2014	Digital download	CMG; Epic Records
United States	July 22, 2014	Digital download	CMG; Epic Records
