= Float (K Camp album) =

Studio album by K Camp
- Released: August 13, 2021
- Genre: Hip hop
- Length: 43:05
- Label: RARE Sound; Interscope; Empire
- Producer: 1st Class; A.D.; Bobby Kritical; Brandon Black; Camden Bench; Deontrez McClusky; Dylan Graham; EbonOnTheTrack; Eric Billingsly; G. Ry; John Conception; Koast; Kreative Villians; Nash B; Natra Average; New Lane Ant; Noah Pettigrew; OG Parker; Omar Guetfa; Section 8; TK; Vntg Jag; YouGotMajor

K Camp chronology
Kiss Five (2020)	Float (2021)	Vibe Forever (2022)

Singles from Float
- 1. "Life Has Changed" Released: April 16, 2021; 2. "Game Ain't Free" Released: June 11, 2021; 3. "Guts" Released: July 23, 2021

Float (stylized in all caps) is the fifth studio album by American rapper K Camp. It was released on August 13, 2021, through RARE Sound, Interscope Records and Empire Distribution. The album features guest appearances from PnB Rock, Trey Songz, Mooski, True Story Gee and Kaleem Taylor. The production on the album was handled by several producers, including OG Parker, Section 8, Bobby Kritical, Natra Average, Nash B and Eric Billingsly, among others.

The album Float was supported by three singles: "Life Has Changed" featuring PnB Rock, "Game Ain't Free", and "Guts" featuring True Story Gee. The album received positive reviews and debuted at number 122 on the US Billboard 200 chart in its first week, dated August 28, 2021.

== Singles ==
The album's first and lead single, "Life Has Changed" featuring American rapper and singer PnB Rock, was released on April 16, 2021, as well as an accompanying music video. The song was produced by Bobby Kritical, Koast and New Lane Ant. The song samples Ginuwine's "Differences".

The second single for the album, "Game Ain't Free", was released on June 11, 2021, with an accompanying music video. The song was produced by OG Parker, G. Ry and Bench.

The album's third and final single for the album, "Guts" featuring American rapper True Story Gee, was released on July 23, 2021. The song was produced by Section 8 and Noah Pettigrew.

== Critical reception ==
Professional ratings
Review scores
Source	Rating
AllMusic	3.5/5 stars

Fred Thomas of AllMusic stated that the album's "finely tuned production and masterful vocal delivery verifies that the success is well deserved". The critic praised the album stating, "amid smooth, trap-infused R&B/rap hybrid tracks like "Tables Turn" and "Flaws Included", Float finds K Camp teaming with PnB Rock for the melodic album standout "Life Has Changed" and getting into more intense territory with the heavy bass and controlled flows on "Guts", with special guest True Story Gee". Thomas also commented, "K Camp navigates a spectrum of styles on Float, hitting the mark on commercially appealing R&B pop with the Trey Songz-featuring "Privacy" and flexing a more aggressive skill set on tracks like "Check My Stats".

== Track listing ==
Credits adapted from Tidal and Genius.

Float track listing
No.	Title	Writer(s)	Producer(s)	Length
1.	"Forgiveness"	Kristopher Campbell; Eric Billingsly; Ebon Thomas	Billingsly; EbonOnTheTrack^{[a]}	3:24
2.	"Check My Stats"	Campbell; Bobby Turner; Omar-Rayan Guetfa; Adarian Kristopher	Bobby Kritical; Omar Guetfa; A.D.	2:34
3.	"Tables Turn"	Campbell; Turner; Josh Gardner	Bobby Kritical; Vntg Jag	3:02
4.	"Game Ain't Free"	Campbell; Joshua Parker; Ryan Martinez; Camden Bench	OG Parker; G. Ry; Bench^{[b]}	3:16
5.	"Slauson"	Campbell; Rai'Shaun Williams	Section 8	3:21
6.	"Yuck"	Campbell; Turner; Christoper Gibbs; Tiernan Kelly	Bobby Kritical; Natra Average; TK	2:09
7.	"Life Has Changed" (featuring PnB Rock)	Campbell; Turner; Cory Cannon; Anthony De La Garza; Rakim Allen; Elgin Lumpkin; Troy Oliver	Bobby Kritical; Koast; New Lane Ant	2:52
8.	"Privacy" (featuring Trey Songz)	Campbell; Kelvin Brown; Tremaine Neverson	Nash B	3:22
9.	"Rain On Your Skin" (featuring Mooski)	Campbell; Turner; Khaleel Griffin; Gardner; Darien Hinton	Bobby Kritical; 1st Class; YouGotMajor^{[a]}	2:22
10.	"Flaws Included"	Campbell; Gibbs	Natra Average	3:45
11.	"Mama"	Campbell; Turner; Brandon Black; Gardner; Kelly; Deontrez McCluskey	Bobby Kritical; Black; Vntg Jag; Kreative Villians^{[a]}; TK^{[a]}; McClusky^{[a]}	1:43
12.	"Guts" (featuring True Story Gee)	Campbell; Williams; Noah Pettigrew; Najibe Brewster	Section 8; Pettigrew	3:40
13.	"Rare Film"	Campbell; Turner; Gardner	Bobby Kritical; Vntg Jag	3:21
14.	"Clap It Up"	Campbell; Billingsly; Dylan Graham; John Conception	Billingsly; Graham^{[a]}; Conception^{[a]}	2:29
15.	"Close To The Edge (Outro)" (featuring Kaleem Taylor)	Campbell; Gibbs; Kaleem Taylor; William Greene; Erica Dawkins; Corey Reese, Jr.	Natra Average	1:36
Total length:				43:05

=== Notes ===
- ^{^[a]} signifies an uncredited producer
- ^{^[b]} signifies an additional producer

=== Sample credits ===
- "Life Has Changed" contains samples and was interpolated from "Differences", written by Elgin Lumpkin and Troy Oliver, as performed by Ginuwine.

== Personnel ==
Credits were adapted from Tidal.

=== Vocalists ===
- K Camp – primary artist
- PnB Rock – featured artist (track 7)
- Trey Songz – featured artist (track 8)
- Mooski – featured artist (track 9)
- True Story Gee – featured artist (track 12)
- Kaleem Taylor – featured artist (track 15)

=== Production ===
- Eric Billingsly – producer (track 1, 14)
- Ebon – uncredited producer (track 1)
- Bobby Kritical – producer (tracks 2, 3, 6, 7, 9, 11, 13)
- Omar Guetfa – producer (track 2)
- A.D. – producer (track 2)
- Vntg Jag – producer (tracks 3, 11, 13)
- OG Parker – producer (track 4)
- G. Ry – producer (track 4)
- Camden Bench – additional producer (track 4)
- Section 8 – producer (tracks 5, 12)
- Natra Average – producer (tracks 6, 10, 15)
- TK – producer (tracks 6, 11)
- Koast – producer (track 7)
- New Lane Ant – producer (track 7)
- Nash B – producer (track 8)
- 1st Class – producer (track 9)
- YouGotMajor – uncredited producer (track 9)
- Brandon Black – producer (track 11)
- Kreative Villians – uncredited producer (track 11)
- Deontrez McClusky – uncredited producer (track 11)
- Noah Pettigrew – producer (track 12)
- Dylan Graham – uncredited producer (track 14)
- John Conception – uncredited producer (track 14)

=== Technical ===
- Travis Louis – assistant mastering engineer, studio personnel (tracks 1–6, 8–15)
- Bill Jabr – mastering engineer, studio personnel (tracks 1–6)
- Jarrod "JRod" Doyle – mixer, recording engineer, studio personnel (all tracks)
- K Camp – recording engineer, studio personnel (tracks 1–6, 8–15)

== Charts ==
Chart performance for Float
Chart (2021)	Peak position
US Billboard 200	122
