= Go Mode =

2014 EP by Snootie Wild

EP by Snootie Wild
- Released: September 23, 2014
- Recorded: 2014
- Genre: Hip hop
- Length: 21:45
- Label: CMG; Epic
- Producer: Yo Gotti (also exec.); Big Fruit; TK; KFigz; Street Symphony; Peter Michael Bush; Quinton McCraven

Snootie Wild chronology
Go Mode (2014)	Ain't No Stoppin' Me (2015)

Singles from Go Mode
- 1. "Yayo" Released: February 3, 2014; 2. "Made Me" Released: July 22, 2014

Professional ratings
Review scores
Source	Rating
AllMusic	3.5/5 stars

Go Mode is the only extended play (EP) by American rapper Snootie Wild. It was released on September 23, 2014 by Collective Music Group and Epic Records. It was supported by the two singles "Yayo" and "Made Me", the latter of which became his first Hot 100 entry. The EP features guest appearances from Yo Gotti, Starlito, K Camp, August Alsina and Zed Zilla. Rolling Stone ranked it at number 35 on the 40 Best Albums of 2014.

== Commercial performance ==
Go Mode debuted at number 119 on the Billboard 200.

== Track listing ==
No.	Title	Writer(s)	Producer(s)	Length
1.	"Here I Go" (featuring Starlito)	LePreston Porter; Jermaine Shute; Torrence Esmond	Street Symphony	3:53
2.	"Made Me" (featuring K Camp)	Porter; Leland Clopton; Kristopher Campell	Big Fruit	3:14
3.	"Yayo" (featuring Yo Gotti)	Porter; Quinton McCraven; Timothy Walls; Mario Mims	Quinton McCraven; KFigz; Peter Michael Bush	3:41
4.	"No Kissing" (featuring Zed Zilla)	Porter; Lazerrick Chills; Darius Henderson	TK	3:42
5.	"She's a Keeper" (featuring August Alsina and Yo Gotti)	Porter; Mims; Henderson	TK	4:01
6.	"Gracias"	Porter; Henderson	TK	3:14
Total length:				21:45

== Charts ==
Chart (2014)	Peak position
US Billboard 200	119
US Top R&B/Hip-Hop Albums (Billboard)	18
