= Yayo (Snootie Wild song) =

Single by Snootie Wild featuring Yo Gotti

from the EP Go Mode
- Released: February 3, 2014
- Recorded: 2013
- Genre: Trap
- Length: 3:40
- Label: Collective Music Group; Epic
- Songwriter(s): Yo Gotti; Quinton McCraven; LePreston Porter; Timothy Walls
- Producer(s): Krazy Figz

Snootie Wild singles chronology
"Yayo" (2014)	"Made Me" (2014)

Yo Gotti singles chronology
"Numb" (2013)	"Yayo" (2014)	"Don't Worry 'Bout It" (2014)

Music video
- "Yayo" on YouTube

"Yayo" is a song by American rapper Snootie Wild, taken from his debut EP Go Mode as his debut single. The song was released on Collective Music Group and Epic Records. "Yayo" also features a guest appearance by Collective Music Group founder Yo Gotti and was produced by Krazy Figz. The song has since peaked at number 30 on the US Billboard Hot R&B/Hip-Hop Songs chart.

== Background ==
The song was originally released as a solo Snootie Wild song in 2013. It then spawned an unofficial remix by rapper T.I., which would then catch the ear of Yo Gotti. Gotti would then sign Wild to his CMG record label, which is distributed through Epic Records.

== Music video ==
Snootie Wild released the music video for "Yayo" in March 2014.

== Remix ==
The official remix of "Yayo" featuring Fabolous, French Montana, Jadakiss, and YG was released on May 13, 2014. The remix then appeared on CMG's first collective compilation project titled Chapter One, which was released on May 22, 2014.

== Charts ==
=== Weekly charts ===
Chart (2014)	Peak position
Belgium Urban (Ultratop Flanders)	49
US Bubbling Under Hot 100 (Billboard)	7
US Hot R&B/Hip-Hop Songs (Billboard)	30

=== Year-end charts ===
Chart (2014)	Position
US Hot R&B/Hip-Hop Songs (Billboard)	90

== Certifications ==
Region	Certification	Certified units/sales
United States (RIAA)	Gold	500,000^{‡}
^{‡} Sales+streaming figures based on certification alone.
