= Kiss Five =

Studio album by K Camp
- Released: April 24, 2020
- Genre: Hip hop
- Length: 45:42
- Label: RARE Sound; Interscope Records
- Producer: Bankroll Got It; Bobby Kritical; Jarrod Doyle; Jsn; K Camp; Motif Alumni; Musik MajorX; Nash B; Natra Average; RetroFuture; Sean Momberger; Swayvvo; XL Eagle; Reazy Renegade

K Camp chronology
Wayy 2 Kritical (2019)	Kiss Five (2020)	Rare Family (2020)

Singles from Kiss Five
- 1. "Lottery (Renegade)" Released: April 1, 2019; 2. "Ice Cold" Released: December 13, 2019; 3. "Black Men Don't Cheat" Released: February 28, 2020; 4. "What's on Your Mind" Released: July 24, 2020

Professional ratings
Review scores
Source	Rating
HipHopDX	3.2/5

Kiss Five (stylized in lower case, commonly referred to as K.I.S.S. 5 or Kiss 5) is the fourth album by American rapper K Camp. It was released on April 24, 2020, via Rare Sound/Interscope Records, serving as the sequel to his 2017 Kiss 4 mixtape and the fifth volume in his KISS series. Production was handled by several record producers, including Natra Average, Jarrod Doyle, and K Camp's frequent collaborators Bobby Kritical and Musik MajorX. It features guest appearances from Ari Lennox, 6lack, Fabo, Jacquees, Jeremih, Joe Trufant, Tink, Wale, Yella Beezy and Yung Bleu.

The album peaked at number 29 on the US Billboard 200, making it the rapper's second most successful project after 2015 release of Only Way Is Up. It was promoted with two singles: "Lottery (Renegade)" with music video directed by Matthew Daniel Siskin, and "Ice Cold" with music video directed by Grant Spanier, and music videos for "Rude Boy" and "Friendly" both directed by Creed x Nfluence.

== Track listing ==
No.	Title	Writer(s)	Producer(s)	Length
1.	"Regret" (Intro)	Kristopher Campbell; Jarrod Doyle; Jasmine Janai Covington	Jarrod Doyle	1:21
2.	"Fall in Line"	Campbell; Doyle	Jarrod Doyle	3:05
3.	"Tatted Up" (featuring Fabo)	Campbell; Lefabian Williams; Christopher Gibbs; Joel Banks; Sean Mula; Taylor Banks; Homer Smith; Xavier Thompson	Bank Roll Got It; Natra Average	3:16
4.	"What's on Your Mind" (featuring Jacquees)	Campbell; Rodriquez Broadnax; Kelvin Brown; Brandon Black; Forte Bowie	Nash B; Sean Momberger	3:52
5.	"Trill Love" (featuring Wale and Joe Trufant)	Campbell; Olubowale Akintimehin; Joe Trufant; Jason Vaughn; Gibbs	Jsn; Natra Average	3:06
6.	"Ice Cold"	Campbell	RetroFuture	3:16
7.	"Rude Boy"	Campbell; Trevon Campbell	K Camp; XL Eagle	2:56
8.	"Friendly" (featuring Yung Bleu)	Campbell; Jeremy Biddle; Jerod Morton; Gibbs	Natra Average; Swayvvo	3:41
9.	"What's Your Name"	Campbell; Doyle	Jarrod Doyle	2:47
10.	"Black Men Don't Cheat" (featuring Ari Lennox, 6lack and Tink)	Campbell; Courtney Salter	Bobby Kritical; Natra Average	3:33
11.	"Top 10" (featuring Yella Beezy)	Campbell; Deandre Conway; Bobby Turner; Marcus Rucker	Bobby Kritical; Motif Alumni	3:37
12.	"Energy"	Campbell; Teddy Pena	RetroFuture	1:52
13.	"1 Mo Time" (featuring Jeremih)	Campbell; Jeremy Felton; Pena	RetroFuture	2:56
14.	"Scared of Love" (Outro)	Campbell; Quinton Cook; Timothy Wells	Musik MajorX	3:33
15.	"Lottery (Renegade)" (Bonus Track)	Campbell; Bryan Johnson	Reazy Renegade	2:51
Total length:				45:42

== Personnel ==
- Kristopher "K Camp" Campbell – main artist, producer (track 7), recording (tracks: 1–5, 7–9, 11, 14)
- Lefabian "Fabo" Williams – featured artist (track 3)
- Rodriquez Jacquees Broadnax – featured artist (track 4)
- Olubowale "Wale" Akintimehin – featured artist (track 5)
- Joe Trufant – featured artist (track 5)
- Jeremy "Yung Bleu" Biddle – featured artist (track 8)
- Courtney "Ari Lennox" Salter – featured artist (track 10)
- Ricardo "6lack" Valentine Jr. – featured artist (track 10)
- Trinity "Tink" Home – featured artist (track 10)
- Deandre "Yella Beezy" Conway – featured artist (track 11)
- Jeremy "Jeremih" Felton – featured artist (track 13)
- Jarrod "J-Rod" Doyle – producer (tracks: 1, 2, 9), mixing, recording (tracks: 1–11, 14, 15)
- Christopher "Natra Average" Gibbs – producer (tracks: 3, 5, 8, 10)
- Taylor Banks – producer (track 3)
- Joel Banks – producer (track 3)
- Sean Mula – producer (track 3)
- Kevlin "Nash B" Brown – producer (track 4)
- Sean Momberger – producer (track 4)
- Jason "Jsn" Vaughn – producer (track 5)
- Teddy "RetroFuture" Pena – producer (tracks: 6, 12, 13)
- Trevon "XL Eagle" Campbell – producer (track 7)
- Jerod "Swayvvo" Morton – producer (track 8)
- Bobby Turner – producer (tracks: 10, 11)
- Marcus "Motif Alumni" Rucker – producer (track 11)
- Quinton L. Cook – producer (track 14)
- Timothy M. Wells – producer (track 14)
- Bryan "Reazy Renegade" Johnson – producer (track 15)
- Glenn Schick – mastering (tracks: 1–4, 6, 10, 15)

== Charts ==
Chart (2020)	Peak position
US Billboard 200	29
US Top R&B/Hip-Hop Albums (Billboard)	18
US Top Rap Albums (Billboard)	13
