= Jalaiah Harmon =

American dancer and content creator

- Born: August 25, 2005 (age 21)
- Occupations: Dancer and content creator

TikTok information
- Page: jalaiahharmon
- Followers: 3.3 million
- Last updated: May 10, 2025

Jalaiah Harmon (born August 25, 2005) is an American dancer and content creator, who is credited for choreographing the Renegade Dance, one of the most popular dances on TikTok. She danced to the song "Lottery" by K-Camp, an Atlanta-based rapper. The renegade dance incorporated viral dances include Woah and Wave.

== Early life ==
Jalaiah Harmon was born and raised in Fayetteville, Georgia. Her mother is Dr. Stefanie Harmon and her father, Dr. Brian Harmon.

== Career ==
Harmon is a professional dancer and content creator.

A feature from The New York Times identified Harmon as the creator of the Renegade dance. It became one of the most viral dances on TikTok in 2020. On September 25, 2019, Harmon, after listening to K Camp's song "Lottery", choreographed the dance, recorded herself and posted the video first on Funimate and then on Instagram. The video gained about 13,000 views on Instagram, with different users recreating the dance video.

In October 2019, the dance was posted on TikTok for the first time by a different creator, with username @global.jones, who changed a few moves at the end. The dance went viral on the platform. The dance was posted by TikTok creator Charli D'Amelio and Addison Rae, who gained more popularity from the dance. Other TikTok users also posted the viral dance. However, no one credited Harmon. In an attempt to get credit for the dance, Harmon started to comment on user pages that posted the Renegade Dance. The comments however, went unnoticed. Eventually Barrie Segal, the head of content at Dubsmash, set up an interview for Harmon with a The New York Times reporter.

Following wider media attention, Harmon signed with United Talent Agency in 2020; Teen Vogue noted that she aspired to become a professional choreographer.

Following the article by The New York Times, K Camp posted a video on X (then Twitter) of Harmon and her friend dancing to the song, with him in the background. In his caption, he thanked Harmon for making his song go viral. A day after this post was made, the NBA invited TikTok content creators, Charli D'Amelio and Addison Rae, to perform the Renegade dance at the 2020 All-Star slam dunk contest during Aaron Gordon's dunk attempt. Harmon was however not invited. Some social media users highlighted the continued promotion of other TikTok users, in this case white creators, while not offering Harmon, a Black creator, similar opportunities. Following the backlash, the NBA invited Harmon for a solo performance of the Renegade dance during the 2020 NBA All-Star game.

In 2020, she performed the Renegade dance at the 2020 NBA All-Star Game at the United Center, Chicago. In 2021, Harmon's docuseries, "I AM: JALAIAH", aired, which explored her personal life and dancing

Following the Renegade dance, Harmon began speaking about the issue of crediting creators, especially Black creators who create popular dances and trends on that go viral on TikTok. Since then, more Black creators have come out to ask for credit for their creativity shared on different social media platforms.

After choreographing the viral Renegade dance, she was able to secure various opportunities, leading to earnings that reached up to $1 million. Jalaiah was also recognized when she was listed in a prominent publication's 2021 30 Under 30 list. This honor recognized her contributions as a dancer and as a spokesperson for fairness and respect in the dance industry.

== Dance style and impact ==
Jalaiah Harmon is not only known for her viral dance to "Renegade," but she has also contributed significantly to the evolution of social media dance trends. Her unique style combines elements of hip-hop, contemporary, and traditional African dance, reflecting a diverse range of influences. The choreography of "Renegade" showcases intricate footwork and fluid body movements, which have inspired countless dancers and content creators on platforms like TikTok and Instagram. Harmon’s rise to fame highlights the intersection of dance and technology, where social media acts as a catalyst for talent discovery. Following the success of her viral dance, she has collaborated with various artists and appeared on national television, further solidifying her status as a prominent figure in the dance community.

Additionally, Harmon often emphasizes the importance of staying true to oneself and encourages young dancers to embrace their individuality in their performances. Her influence extends beyond dance; Harmon uses her platform to advocate for mental health awareness among young performers. She often shares personal stories, encouraging her followers to prioritize self-care and resilience in the face of challenges. This combination of talent and advocacy positions Harmon as a role model for aspiring dancers and creators alike.
