= Snootie Wild =

American rapper and singer (1985–2022)

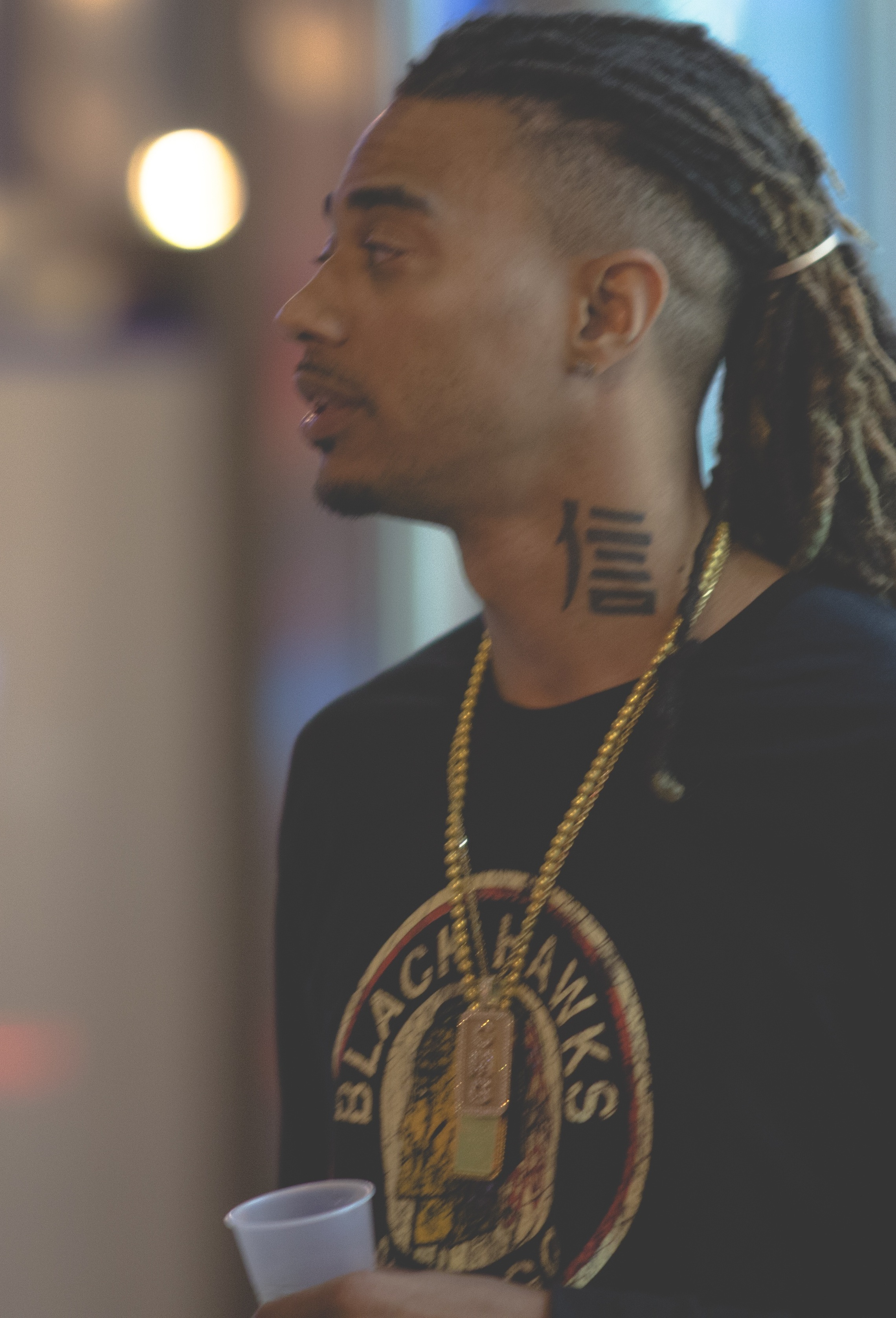
- Snootie Wild in 2015

Background information
- Born: LaPreston Porter III; April 23, 1985; Memphis, Tennessee, U.S.
- Died: February 26, 2022 (aged 36) Houston, Texas, U.S.
- Genres: Hip hop
- Occupations: Rapper, singer
- Years active: 2006–2022
- Labels: Heartland; CMG; Epic

LaPreston Porter (April 23, 1985 – February 26, 2022), better known by his stage name Snootie Wild, was an American rapper and singer. He was best known for his first single, "Yayo", which success helped launch his career. The song charted in the Billboard Hot R&B/Hip-Hop Songs chart. In October 2013, it was announced that a fellow Memphis-based rapper, Yo Gotti, had signed Wild to his Collective Music Group (CMG) imprint, an affiliate of Epic Records In September 2014, Wild released his only extended play, Go Mode. The EP's second single, "Made Me", peaked at number 93 on the US Billboard Hot 100 chart, becoming the highest-charting single of his career.

== Early life ==
Porter was born in Memphis, Tennessee, on April 23, 1985. He is the nephew of Arthur Lee from the rock band Love. He grew up listening to artists like Three 6 Mafia, Project Pat and Yo Gotti. He spent four years in prison from the age of 21 to 25.

== Career ==
While signed under Heartland Entertainment, Wild released his breakout single "Yayo", which was produced by K-Figz. The song caught the attention of Yo Gotti, who later remixed the song, adding another verse. Gotti included the remix on his thirteenth mixtape Nov 19: The Mixtape, which was released on September 2, 2013. The song was again remixed by the Atlanta-based rapper T.I., which helped further its success. "Yayo", featuring Yo Gotti, became the official version and was released via digital distribution on February 3, 2014. The song debuted at number 50 on Billboard's Hot R&B/Hip-Hop Songs chart and at number 40 on Billboard's Mainstream R&B/Hip-Hop chart.

On October 28, 2013, it was announced that Yo Gotti had signed Wild to his Collective Music Group (CMG) imprint. In December 2013, it was revealed Wild had secured a recording contract with Epic Records. He has since performed several times with Gotti, including on Gotti's national tour and a performance at B.B. King's in New York City. Wild released the music video for "Yayo" in March 2014. Wild also performed at the 2014 SXSW Interactive, in early 2014. The official remix of "Yayo" featuring Fabolous, French Montana, Jadakiss and YG was released on May 13, 2014. The remix appeared on CMG's first collective compilation project titled Chapter One, which was released on May 22, 2014. It has 16 tracks and includes Fabolous, Jadakiss, French Montana, YG and K Camp. Production was by Big Fruit, TK, Megaman, Nonstop and others. Wild is credited on five tracks of the mixtape, but appeared on one track more. On September 23, 2014, Wild released his first EP Go Mode.

On May 14, 2015, Wild released the mixtape Ain't No Stoppin' Me, which included the single "Rich or Not". In August 2016, he was featured on the track "Believe" by the rapper Master P, which appeared on the latter's mixtape, The G Mixtape.

== Death ==
On February 25, 2022, Porter was found in a ditch in Houston with gunshot wounds to his neck. He was hospitalized in critical condition, but died the following day at age 36. He left behind four children. His funeral was held in Memphis, Tennessee. Ten months after the crime, Ivory Duke Williams was arrested by Houston police and charged with the murder.

== Discography ==
=== Extended plays ===
List of EPs, with selected information
Title	Album details	Peak chart positions		
Title	Album details	US	US R&B	US Rap
Go Mode	Released: September 23, 2014; Label: Collective Music Group, Epic Records; Format: CD, Digital download	119	18	8

=== Mixtapes ===
List of mixtapes, with selected information
Title	Mixtape details
Chapter One (with CMG)	Released: May 22, 2014; Label: Collective Music Group; Format: Digital download
Ain't No Stoppin' Me	Released: May 14, 2015; Label: Collective Music Group; Format: Digital download

=== Singles ===
==== As lead artist ====
List of singles as lead artist, with selected chart positions, showing year released and album name
Title	Year	Peak chart positions			Certifications	Album
Title	Year	US	US R&B	US Rap	Certifications	Album
"Yayo" (featuring Yo Gotti)	2014	— (Note: "Yayo" did not enter the Billboard Hot 100, but peaked at number 7 on the Bubbling Under Hot 100 Singles chart.)	30	19	RIAA: Gold	Go Mode
"Made Me" (featuring K Camp)	2014	93	38	—		Go Mode
"Rich or Not"	2014	—	—	—		Ain't No Stoppin Me
"El Pablo"	2016	—	—	—		Non-album single
"—" denotes a recording that did not chart.

==== As featured artist ====
List of singles as a featured artist, showing year released and album name
Title	Year	Album
"Money Bandit" (Tiny T featuring Snooty Wild)	2014	Non-album singles
"Kitchen" (SMG featuring Snooty Wild)	2014	Non-album singles
"Hold On" (Conan featuring Snooty Wild)	2014	Non-album singles
"Oh Lawd" (Supastar Lt featuring Snooty Wild)	2014	Non-album singles
"Money on the Way" (DpoetSoSmoove featuring Snooty Wild)	2014	Non-album singles
"Niggas Hate" (Young Blake featuring Snooty Wild)	2014	Non-album singles
"Shine on Em" (Soufside featuring Snooty Wild)	2015	Look What I Did
"You know Im a Boss" Extream Bling featuring Snooty Wild)	2015	Non-album single
"Believe" (Master P featuring Moe Roy and Snooty Wild)	2016	The G Mixtape
"Back it up" (Jazz Anderson featuring Snooty Wild)	2018	Non-album single

== Music videos ==
=== As lead artist ===
List of music videos, with directors, showing year released
Title	Year	Director(s)
"IDGAF"	2013	Moe Nunley
"Yayo" (featuring Yo Gotti)	2014	Mr. Boomtown
"No Kissing" (featuring Zed Zilla)	2014	Cricket
"Made Me" (featuring K Camp)	2014	Motion Family

=== As featured artist ===
List of music videos, with directors, showing year released
Title	Year	Director(s)
"Haunted Traphouse" (TP Da Great featuring Snootie Wild)	2011	Moe Nunley
"Money Bandit" (Tiny T featuring Snootie Wild)	2014	—N/a
"Double Cup (Remix)" (DJ Infamous featuring Yo Gotti, Ace Hood, Kirko Bangz, Jim Jones, Snootie Wild and Tiffany Foxx)	2014	Stevie Rodriquez
"Gimme Back my Dope (Remix)" (Da Mafia 6ix featuring Snootie Wild)	2015	—N/a
"You know Im a Boss" (Extream Bling featuring Snootie Wild)	2015	Cricket

== See also ==
- List of murdered hip hop musicians
