= Black Dollar =

Mixtape by Rick Ross
- Released: September 3, 2015
- Genre: Hip hop
- Length: 73:26
- Label: MMG; Def Jam
- Producer: Beat Billionaire; Black Metaphor; Bobby Kritical; D. Rich; Key Wane; J.U.S.T.I.C.E. League; Jake One; Kennedy Rothchild; Nonstop Da Hitman; Scott Storch

Rick Ross chronology
| Hood Billionaire (2014) | Black Dollar (2015) | Black Market (2015) |

Rick Ross mixtape chronology
| The Black Bar Mitzvah (2012) | Black Dollar (2015) | Renzel Remixes (2015) |

Black Dollar is the fourth mixtape by American rapper Rick Ross. It was released on September 3, 2015. It features guest appearances from Anthony Hamilton, August Alsina, Future, Gucci Mane, Meek Mill, The-Dream, Kevin Cossom, Wale and Whole Slab.

Black Dollar was released to generally positive reviews. Kenny "Barto" Bartolomei of J.U.S.T.I.C.E. League, who has frequently collaborated with Rick Ross since 2008, said regarding the mixtape, "[Ross] sounds hungry on this project.”

== Track listing ==
| No. | Title | Producer(s) | Length |
|---|---|---|---|
| 1. | "Foreclosures" | J.U.S.T.I.C.E. League; 8 Bars | 4:16 |
| 2. | "Money Dance" (featuring The-Dream) | Jake One | 7:37 |
| 3. | "We Gon Make It" | Black Metaphor | 2:48 |
| 4. | "Bill Gates" | D. Rich | 4:06 |
| 5. | "Money & Powder" | Key Wane | 4:41 |
| 6. | "Geechi Liberace" | Jake One | 4:02 |
| 7. | "Icon" (featuring Anthony Hamilton) | J.U.S.T.I.C.E. League | 4:19 |
| 8. | "World's Finest" (featuring Meek Mill and Kevin Cossom) | Scott Storch | 4:07 |
| 9. | "Drive a Nigga Crazy" | Jake One | 3:27 |
| 10. | "Turn Ya Back" (featuring Gucci Mane, Meek Mill and Whole Slab) | D. Rich | 5:20 |
| 11. | "Knights of the Templar" | D. Rich | 3:07 |
| 12. | "Take Advantage" (featuring Future) | Beat Billionaire | 3:40 |
| 13. | "Beautiful Lie" (featuring Wale) | Nonstop Da Hitman | 5:20 |
| 14. | "She Wanna Fuck" (featuring August Alsina) | Kennedy Rothchild | 3:45 |
| 15. | "Bel Air" | | 3:34 |
| 16. | "2 Shots" (featuring Kevin Cossom) | | 4:36 |
| 17. | "Dead Rappers" | Bobby Kritical | 3:51 |
