= SoundOn =

Music Distribution Platform

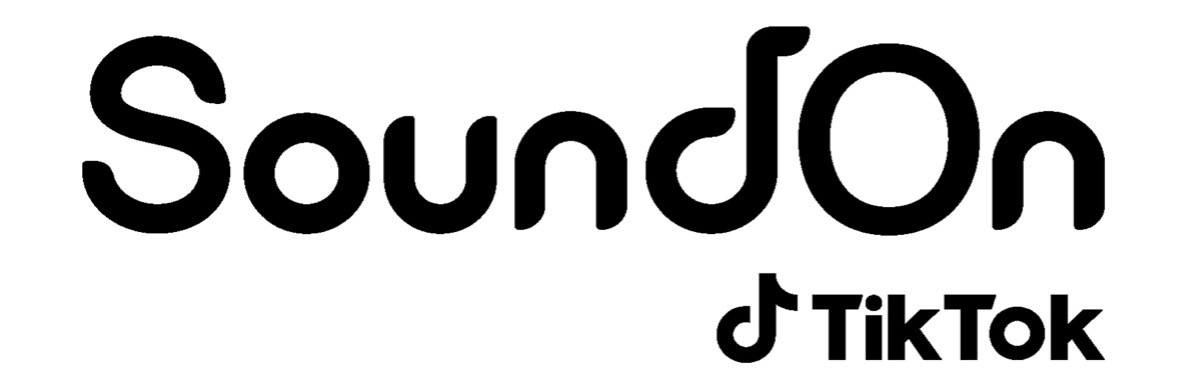
- Website type: Subsidiary
- Founded: 2021
- Area served: Worldwide
- Owner: TikTok
- Industry: Music
- Products: Online music distribution
- Services: Open platform music distribution and publishing administration.
- Parent: ByteDance
- Website: www.soundon.global

SoundOn is a music marketing and distribution platform founded in 2021 by TikTok. It mainly provides song distribution and artist services. The tool lets users upload music directly to TikTok to earn royalties, while allowing them to retain their copyright on the music. The service also distributes artists' music to other platforms. The platform provides support including audience insights and development advice.

Powered by TikTok, SoundOn was designed to serve as a platform for new musicians. On the platform, artists receive all of their royalties in the first year, and 90% after that. As of July 2023, it is available in the US, the UK, Australia, Brazil, Indonesia, and New Zealand, among others.

== History ==
The platform began beta testing in the fall of 2021. Since its launch in 2022, singers Muni Long, Games We Play, Abby Roberts, and Chloe Adams have published their songs on SoundOn.

In March 2022, the service was officially rolled out. SoundOn was initially introduced in Brazil and Indonesia. In July 2022, it launched a pre-release feature. In December 2022, Dolly Parton formally released her song "Berry Pie" via the platform.

In February 2023, SoundOn became available in Australia. In March, it made an appearance at SXSW in Austin, Texas and organized activities related to interaction with artists.
