= Vibe Forever =

Studio album by K Camp
- Released: July 29, 2022
- Genre: Hip hop
- Length: 31:07
- Label: RARE Sound; Interscope; Empire
- Producer: 8 Major; 30 Roc; 44WXRLD; Anthony Villena; Brandon Black; Chase Millie; DJ Plugg; Darius Jenkins; David Morse; Deedotwill; Eric Billingsly; Foreverolling; Harto Beats; J-Rod; Key Man; Klokez; Lemy; Slauted; Sloan; Tash; Trappin N London; UpNorth; Xclusive; XL Eagle

K Camp chronology
Float (2021)	Vibe Forever (2022)	Spin The Block (2023)

Singles from Vibe Forever
- 1. "Woozie" Released: May 24, 2022; 2. "Holy Spirit" Released: July 8, 2022

Vibe Forever is the sixth studio album by American rapper K Camp. It was released on July 29, 2022, through RARE Sound, Interscope Records and Empire Distribution. It is the follow-up to K Camp's fifth album Float (2021). The album features guest appearances from Ne-Yo and Doe Boy. The album also features production from 30 Roc, XL Eagle, Foreverolling, Trappin N London, DJ Plugg, and J-Rod, among others.

The album was supported by two singles: "Woozie" and "Holy Spirit". The album is K Camp's final album release under the Interscope Records imprint.

== Background ==
On July 27, 2022, K Camp announced that he would complete his contract with Interscope Records by releasing his album Vibe Forever. He later tweeted: "This is my last album with a major label and I'm officially an independent artist. It feels good to be free". And, he added, "I've been signed since 2014 and I always felt compressed, but I kept my motion going. Finally, being able to do me is a blessing. I give it all to God".

== Singles ==
The first single, "Woozie", was released on May 24, 2022. The song was produced by Foreverolling, XL Eagle and Chase Millie.

The second and final single, "Holy Spirit", was released on July 8, 2022. The song was produced by Harto Beats and Eric Billingsly.

== Track listing ==
Credits adapted from Tidal, Spotify, and Genius.

No.	Title	Writer(s)	Producer(s)	Length
1.	"Woozie"	Kristopher Campbell; Jeffrey Lynn Jones Jr.; Trevon Campbell; Darrius Daquan Clapp	Foreverolling; XL Eagle; Chase Millie	3:03
2.	"3AM In Miami"	Campbell; London Ruth; Nash Sheikh	Trappin N London; Slauted	2:49
3.	"Holy Spirit"	Campbell; Ryan Hartlove; Eric Billinglsy	Harto Beats; Billingsly	3:09
4.	"If These Walls Could Talk"	Campbell; Jarrod Doyle; David Morrison	J-Rod; Morse	3:02
5.	"Luxury Garments"	Campbell; Samuel Gloade; Chevez Clarke; Alexander Nunez; Eric Sloan Jr.	30 Roc; 8 Major; Klokez; Sloan	2:39
6.	"Blow Da Budget"	Campbell; Kenneth Smith Jr.; Keondrea Williams	DJ Plugg; Deedotwill	1:39
7.	"To The Moon"	Campbell; Doyle; Rena Faith	J-Rod	3:13
8.	"Bullseye"	Campbell; Ruth; Doyle; Morrison; Atia Boggs	Trappin N London; J-Rod; Morse	1:54
9.	"Milwaukee"	Campbell; Doyle; Ruth; Kasper Hinze Knudse; Nicolai Andersen; Anders Storm Runge Christiansen; Billingsly	J-Rod; Trappin N London; UpNorth; Billingsly	2:45
10.	"Don't You Change" (featuring Ne-Yo)	Campbell; Shaffer Smith; Doyle; Ruth; Brandon Black; Hunter Sallis; Darius Jenkins	J-Rod; Trappin N London; Black; Key Man; Jenkins	2:32
11.	"Without Risk" (featuring Doe Boy)	Campbell; Cotrell Dennard; Nyles Daniel; Edward Theodore Riley; Campbell	44WXRLD; Tash	2:16
12.	"Lead From The Heart"	Campbell; Doyle; Lemuel Wilson; Traevon Walker	J-Rod; Lemy; Xclusive	1:58
Total length:				31:07

== Personnel ==
Credits adapted from Tidal.

Vocalists

- K Camp — primary artist
- Ne-Yo — featured artist (track 10)
- Doe Boy — featured artist (track 11)
- Atia Boggs — background artist (track 8)

Technical

- Bill Jabr — mastering engineer (all tracks), mixer (all tracks), recording engineer (tracks 1 and 3)
- Jarrod "J-Rod" Doyle — mixer (all tracks), engineer (track 2, 4–12)
- K Camp — engineer (track 2–12)
- Travis Louis — mastering engineer (tracks 2, 4–12)

Production

- Foreverolling — producer (track 1)
- XL Eagle — producer (track 1)
- Chase Millie — producer (track 1)
- Trappin N London — producer (tracks 2, 8–10)
- Slauted — producer (track 2)
- Harto Beats — producer (track 3)
- Eric Billingsly — producer (tracks 3 and 9)
- J-Rod — producer (tracks 4, 7–10, 12)
- David Morse — producer (tracks 4 and 8)
- 30 Roc — producer (track 5)
- 8 Major — producer (track 5)
- Klokez — producer (track 5)
- Sloan — producer (track 5)
- DJ Plugg — producer (track 6)
- Deedotwill — producer (track 6)
- UpNorth — producer (track 9)
- Brandon Black — producer (track 10)
- Key Man — producer (track 10)
- Darius Jenkins — producer (track 10)
- 44WXRLD — producer (track 11)
- Tash — producer (track 11)
- Lemy — producer (track 12)
- Xclusive — producer (track 12)
