= Money Baby =

2013 single by K Camp featuring Kwony Cash

Single by K Camp featuring Kwony Cash

from the EP Show Money and In Due Time
- Released: October 22, 2013
- Length: 3:39
- Label: FTE; 4.27; Interscope
- Songwriters: Kristopher Campell; LaQuan Williams; Leland Clopton
- Producer: Big Fruit

K Camp singles chronology
"All the Way Down" (2012)	"Money Baby" (2013)	"Cut Her Off" (2013)

Kwony Cash singles chronology
"Money Baby" (2013)

Music video
- "Money Baby" on YouTube

"Money Baby" is a song by American rapper K Camp from his collaborative mixtape Show Money (2013) with Tha Joker and the lead single from his debut EP In Due Time (2014). It features American rapper Kwony Cash and was produced by Big Fruit.

== Background ==
"Money Baby" began as a freestyle rap and was originally called "I Like". K Camp sent the beat of the song to Kwony Cash, who at the time had gained some attention for his collaboration with rapper Rich Homie Quan. Kwony recorded a verse on it, though Camp did not record until three weeks later. They sent the song to DJ Ace for his CIAA event. DJ MLK heard it and discussed with Camp about getting rappers Drake and Lil Wayne to appear on the song. After a long period of time without hearing back, Camp still released the song with a cover. The song started to be popularly played on radio stations and in nightclubs, becoming K Camp's first hit single. According to Camp, it had received 200 thousand views on YouTube in two to three weeks since its upload, but was initially deleted from YouTube due to copyright infringement from using the album cover of Nirvana's Nevermind.

The song also appears on DJ Spinz and DJ Pretty Boy Tank's mixtape Space Invaders 10 (2014).

== Composition ==
The song has been described as a "hyped-up celebration" of what K Camp enjoys, such as marijuana, sex, getting intoxicated, brand new items and money.

== Music video ==
A music video for the song was released on October 30, 2013. Meaghan Garvey of The Fader described it "essentially recreates Nirvana's Nevermind cover, but with strippers".

== Remix ==
The official remix features Moroccan American rapper French Montana and American singer Ty Dolla Sign, and was released on February 14, 2014.

== Charts ==
Chart (2014)	Peak position
US Bubbling Under Hot 100 (Billboard)	8
US Hot R&B/Hip-Hop Songs (Billboard)	31
US Rhythmic Airplay (Billboard)	37

== Certifications ==
Region	Certification	Certified units/sales
United States (RIAA)	Platinum	1,000,000^{‡}
^{‡} Sales+streaming figures based on certification alone.
