= Bobby Kritical =

- Birth name: Bobby Bernard Turner Jr.
- Born: September 8, 1988 (age 36); Atlanta, Georgia, U.S.
- Genres: Hip hop; trap; R&B
- Occupations: Record producer; songwriter; audio engineer
- Instruments: FL Studio; keyboard
- Years active: 2005–present
- Labels: We R Perfection

Bobby Bernard Turner Jr. (born September 8, 1988), professionally known as Bobby Kritical, is an American record producer, songwriter and audio engineer. He is best known for having produced singles and albums for music industry acts—mainly in hip hop—including K Camp, Gucci Mane, Lil Uzi Vert, and YFN Lucci, among others. His collaborative album with K Camp, Wayy 2 Kritical (2019), was released by Interscope Records.

== Career ==
Bobby Bernard Turner Jr. was born in Atlanta, Georgia. He first received local attention by co-producing "97" for K Camp in 2017. Later in 2017, he received national attention for co-producing songs "For Real" & "Diamonds All on My Wrist" on Lil Uzi Vert's Luv Is Rage 2. Bobby Kritical received national attention in 2018 for producing "Trust Me" by Bhad Bhabie. In 2019, Bobby Kritical was the executive producer for "Wayy 2 Kritical" which was the third studio album for K Camp.

== Production discography ==
=== 2015 ===
K Camp – Only Way Is Up

- 12. "I'm Good"

Lil Uzi Vert – Luv Is Rage

- 11. "Belly"

Rick Ross – Black Dollar

- 17. "Dead Rappers"

=== 2016 ===
2 Chainz – Daniel Son; Necklace Don

- 08. "You In Luv with Her" featuring YFN Lucci

2 Chainz – ColleGrove

- 09. "100 Joints"

=== 2017 ===
K Camp

- 00. "Good Problem"

Lil Uzi Vert – Luv Is Rage 2

- 06. "For Real"
- 19. "Diamonds All on My Wrist"

=== 2018 ===
YFN Lucci – Freda's Son

- 02. "Front Row in LA"
- 03. "650 Luc"

Bhad Bhabie – 15 (mixtape)

- 13. "Trust Me" featuring Ty Dolla Sign

JID – DiCaprio 2

- 12. "Just Da Other Day"

=== 2019 ===
Gucci Mane – Woptober II

- 10. "Wop Longway Takeoff" featuring Peewee Longway and Takeoff

=== 2020 ===
K Camp – Kiss Five

- 10. "Black Men Don't Cheat" featuring Ari Lennox, 6lack and Tink
- 11. "Top 10" featuring Yella Beezy
