= Lottery (K Camp song) =

2019 single by K Camp

"Lottery (Renegade)"

Single by K Camp

from the album Wayy 2 Kritical and Kiss Five
- Released: April 1, 2019
- Recorded: 2019
- Studio: Jungle City (New York City)
- Length: 2:50
- Label: Rare Sound; Empire; Interscope
- Songwriter: Kristopher Thomas Campbell
- Producer: Reazy Renegade

K Camp singles chronology
| "Switch" (2019) | "Lottery (Renegade)" (2019) | "Ice Cold" (2019) |

Music video
- "Lottery" on YouTube

"Lottery", later re-titled as "Lottery (Renegade)" is a song by American rapper K Camp from his third studio album Wayy 2 Kritical (2019). It was released as the album's third single on April 1, 2019, by Rare Sound and Interscope Record, and later included as a bonus track on Camp's fourth studio album, Kiss Five (2020). The song was written by K Camp himself and produced by Reazy Renegade. In late 2019, the song went viral online, due to a dance challenge on TikTok, becoming the first sound on the platform to reach 20 million videos. K Camp credited choreographer Jalaiah Harmon for creating the dance challenge, after controversy arose due to Harmon not initially getting credit for it. The song's two official remixes respectively feature fellow American rappers Quavo and T-Pain.

== Background ==
Less than a year after the release of his second studio album Rare Sound, K Camp released his third album Wayy 2 Kritikal in June 2019. Prior to the release of the album, "Lottery" was released in April 2019. The song was initially sometimes mistakenly referred to as "Lottery (Renegade)" or just "Renegade", due to producer Reazy Renegade's producer tag in the intro of the song and due to the song's accompanying dance, the "Renegade" challenge. After the song gained popularity, with views rising from 25 million to 3 billion views and 30 million creates, its title was changed to "Lottery (Renegade)".

== Production ==
The entire song was made in two days. Producer Reazy Renegade explained: "I was in the studio with K Camp. We were working in New York while he was on tour. We made the song and beat the same day. It took two days. In the first session, I finished the beat, Camp had the hook, he took it back to the hotel that night and wrote the verses. We went to Alicia Keys' studio the next day — Jungle Studios — and he recorded it. We mixed it that day, it was mastered the day after, and then it went out the week after".

== Composition ==
"Lottery" is a hip hop song that features drums as its sole instrumentation. The song contains "muddy, distorted 808s and minimalist production". Producer Reazy Renegade said when he made the 808, he knew it was going to be impactful, calling the song a "perfect jungle".

== Renegade dance and controversy ==
In early 2020, the song gained major popularity after being used in viral videos on video-sharing app TikTok, thanks to a dance craze known as the "Renegade" challenge, created by 14 year-old choreographer, Jalaiah Harmon. Harmon said she came up with the dance in "5 to 10 minutes" before rushing off to showcase it at her dance class. She debuted the dance on video-messaging app Dubsmash in September 2019. It was however co-opted by popular TikTok user Charli D'Amelio who posted her dance on TikTok, and subsequently received credit for it. This generated controversy, with The New York Times running an article criticizing the lack of credit due to Harmon. Paper magazine also later picked this up. Speaking to The New York Times, Harmon said "I think I could have gotten money for it, promos for it, I could have gotten famous off it, get noticed", but because she wasn't credited for originating the dance, Harmon said, none of that occurred at the time. Shortly after the NY Times article was published, Harmon uploaded a video to Instagram performing the dance alongside D'Amelio and another fellow TikTok user Addison Easterling. A friend of K Camp's knew Harmon's mom and got the two in contact with each other. Harmon and her friend Kaliyah Davis later joined Camp in a studio on Valentine's Day where they filmed a new video for the dance. Camp would later give recognition to Harmon for originating the dance. On February 16, 2020, she performed the dance at the 2020 NBA All-Star Game. On February 20, 2020, Harmon performed the routine on The Ellen DeGeneres Show, where DeGeneres presented Harmon with a jacket that read "the original Renegade dancer" on the back, with her name on the front and gifted her $5,000. The success of the song has also been attributed to Harmon's dance.

== Critical reception ==
On March 26, 2020, Complex magazine included the song in their list "12 Songs Blowing Up on TikTok (That Are Actually Worth Listening to)". In an article for Highsnobiety, Kieran Press-Reynolds described "Renegade" as a landmark song of TikTok rap, a subgenre that uses a lack of melody to create "a potentially dance-craze igniting 15 seconds," which is conducive with algorithmic success on the app. Press-Reynolds credited how it is "immensely satisfying to watch someone synchronize with thundering low-end", combined with the "slapstick absurdism of blown-out bass," that makes the song so successful.

== Music video ==
The song's official video was released on June 22, 2019. It was directed by Matthew Daniel Siskin. The video features "dynamic lighting", with a room full of dancers performing sequences to the song. Milca P of HotNewHipHop said the dancers have "on cue talent" and together effectively bring "new life to the banger of a track".

== Awards and nominations ==
| Year | Ceremony | Category | Result |
|---|---|---|---|
| 2021 | iHeartRadio Music Awards | TikTok Bop of the Year | Nominated |

== Charts ==
| Chart (2019–2020) | Peak position |
|---|---|
| Argentina Hot 100 (Billboard) | 65 |
| Canada Hot 100 (Billboard) | 40 |
| US Bubbling Under Hot 100 (Billboard) | 15 |
| US R&B/Hip-Hop Airplay (Billboard) | 40 |

== Certifications ==
| Region | Certification | Certified units/sales |
|---|---|---|
| United States (RIAA) | Platinum | 1,000,000^{‡} |
^{‡} Sales+streaming figures based on certification alone.
