= Comfortable (song) =

Single by K Camp

from the album Only Way Is Up
- Released: June 9, 2015
- Genre: Hip hop
- Length: 3:31
- Label: FTE; 4.27 Music Group; Interscope
- Songwriters: Kristopher Campbell; Damar Jackson; Leland Clopton
- Producer: Big Fruit

K Camp singles chronology
"Made Me" (2014)	"Comfortable" (2015)	"1Hunnid" (2015)

"Comfortable" is a song by American rapper K Camp for his debut studio album Only Way Is Up. It was released on June 9, 2015, as the album's second single. "Comfortable" has since peaked at number 54 on the Billboard Hot 100. The official remix features Akon and 50 Cent.

== Commercial performance ==
In the United States, "Comfortable" peaked at number 54 on the Billboard Hot 100 on the issue dated September 26, 2015.

== Music video ==
The song's music video features K Camp at Punta Cana, Dominican Republic. In the video, K Camp is shown with his love interest, with a Handycam to capture their vacation moments.

== Charts ==
Chart (2015)	Peak position
US Billboard Hot 100	54
US Hot R&B/Hip-Hop Songs (Billboard)	22
US Rhythmic Airplay (Billboard)	10

== Certifications ==
Region	Certification	Certified units/sales
United States (RIAA)	2× Platinum	2,000,000^{‡}
^{‡} Sales+streaming figures based on certification alone.
