= Cut Her Off =

2013 single by K Camp featuring 2 Chainz

Single by K Camp featuring 2 Chainz

from the album In Due Time
- Released: December 19, 2013
- Recorded: 2013
- Genre: Hip hop, trap
- Length: 4:03
- Label: FTE; 4.27 Music Group; Interscope
- Songwriters: Kristopher Campell; Tauheed Epps
- Producer: Will-A-Fool

K Camp singles chronology
"Money Baby" (2013)	"Cut Her Off" (2013)	"Turn Up For a Check" (2014)

2 Chainz singles chronology
"All Me" (2013)	"Cut Her Off" (2013)	"Only That Real" (2014)

Music video
- "Cut Her Off" on YouTube

"Cut Her Off" (also known as "Cut That Bitch Off") is song by American rapper K Camp with a guest appearance from fellow Atlanta rapper 2 Chainz. It was co-written by both artists and produced by Will-A-Fool. It was released on December 11, 2013 as the first single from his debut EP In Due Time. "Cut Her Off" peaked at number five on the Billboard Hot Rap Songs chart and number 49 on the Hot 100.

== Critical reception ==
"Cut Her Off" was met with generally positive reviews from music critics. Complex named it the forty-first best song of the first half of 2014. In his review, Justin Davis said, "K Camp has started the year with a number of hits, but 'Cut Her Off' is undoubtedly his catchiest. The song's subject matter is simple enough—Camp is fed up with the stress from clingy women—but his melodies grab the listener to repeat his rebellious verses verbatim. It's literally the rap version of Beyoncé's 'Irreplaceable'. Add in an equally wacky 2 Chainz verse and 'Cut Her Off' is easily the breakup anthem of the year."

== Commercial performance ==
"Cut Her Off" debuted at number 89 on the Billboard Hot 100 the week of April 26, 2014. Ten weeks later, it peaked at number 49 on the week of July 5, 2014. It spent a total of twenty weeks on the chart.

== Music video ==
Directed by Alex Nazari, the song's music video features K Camp being harassed by various women, while he ignores them. In the middle part, K Camp answers a payphone call from 2 Chainz asking him to come to a restaurant. He enters through the back of the kitchen and meets with 2 Chainz who's eating with a bunch of women at the table. The video premiered on the artist's YouTube page on May 21, 2014.

== Remix ==
The official remix to "Cut Her Off" features Lil Boosie, Too Short and YG. The music video for the official remix was released on July 15, 2014. In the video, the three rappers stunt on a set surrounded by nice cars and a group of women.

A female version of the remix entitled "Cut U Off" was released by rapper Trina featuring singer Lil Mo.

Rapper Wiz Khalifa also released a Weedmix of the single called "Get That Zip Off" for his 12th mixtape 28 Grams in 2014.

== Certifications ==
Region	Certification	Certified units/sales
United States (RIAA)	Platinum	1,000,000^{‡}
^{‡} Sales+streaming figures based on certification alone.

== Awards and nominations ==
Year	Ceremony	Award	Result
2014	2014 BET Hip Hop Awards	Track of the Year	Nominated
2014	2014 BET Hip Hop Awards	Best Club Banger	Nominated

== Charts ==
=== Weekly charts ===
Chart (2014)	Peak position
Belgium Urban (Ultratop Flanders)	44
US Billboard Hot 100	49
US Hot R&B/Hip-Hop Songs (Billboard)	11
US Rhythmic Airplay (Billboard)	22

=== Year-end charts ===
Chart (2014)	Position
US Hot R&B/Hip-Hop Songs (Billboard)	44

=== Certifications ===
Region	Certification	Certified units/sales
United States (RIAA)	Platinum	1,000,000^{‡}
^{‡} Sales+streaming figures based on certification alone.
