= K Camp =

American rapper

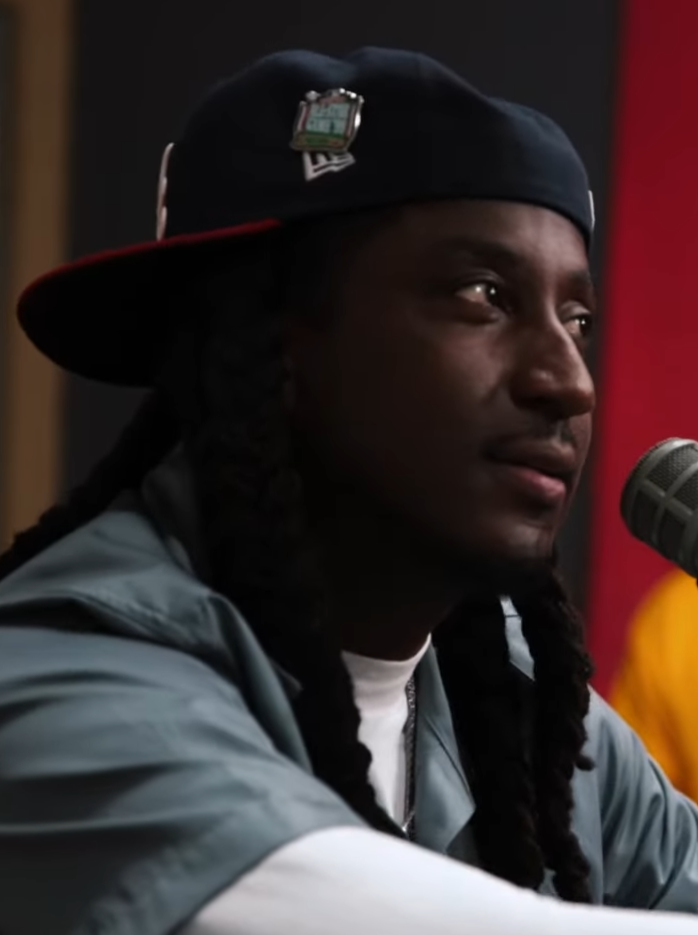
- K Camp in 2024

Background information
- Born: Kristopher Thomas Campbell; April 27, 1990 (age 36); Milwaukee, Wisconsin, U.S.
- Origin: Atlanta, Georgia, U.S.
- Genres: Southern hip-hop; R&B
- Occupations: Rapper; singer; songwriter
- Works: K Camp discography
- Years active: 2009−present
- Labels: Rare Sound; SoundOn; Interscope; Family Ties; 4.27; EMPIRE
- Website: www.raresound.com

Kristopher Thomas Campbell (born April 27, 1990), known professionally as K Camp (stylized as K CAMP) is an American rapper. Born in Milwaukee and raised in Atlanta, Georgia, Campbell began his recording career in 2009. The local success of his 2013 single, "Money Baby", led him to sign with Interscope Records. Released in December of that year, his follow-up single "Cut Her Off" (remixed featuring 2 Chainz) became his first and highest-charting entry on the Billboard Hot 100 (peaking at number 49). Both songs received platinum certifications by the Recording Industry Association of America (RIAA) and preceded the release of his debut extended play (EP), In Due Time (2014).

Campbell's debut studio album, Only Way Is Up (2015), peaked at number 20 on the Billboard 200 and was supported by the double platinum-certified single, "Comfortable." His 2019 single, "Lottery (Renegade)", marked a brief period of commercial resurgence for its usage on the video platform TikTok. He signed with SoundOn, the platform's subsidiary distribution service, in 2023.

Campbell founded the record label Rare Sound in 2018. He was selected as part of the XXL 2015 Freshman Class, and named by Rolling Stone as a "New Artist You Need To Know" that same year. He has also received nominations for a BET Hip Hop Award and an iHeartRadio Music Award.

== Early life ==
Campbell was born in Milwaukee, Wisconsin but grew up in Atlanta, Georgia. His family introduced him to music at an early age and he has attributed some of his biggest influences as André 3000, Tupac Shakur, and The Notorious B.I.G. He attended Osborne High School.

== Career ==
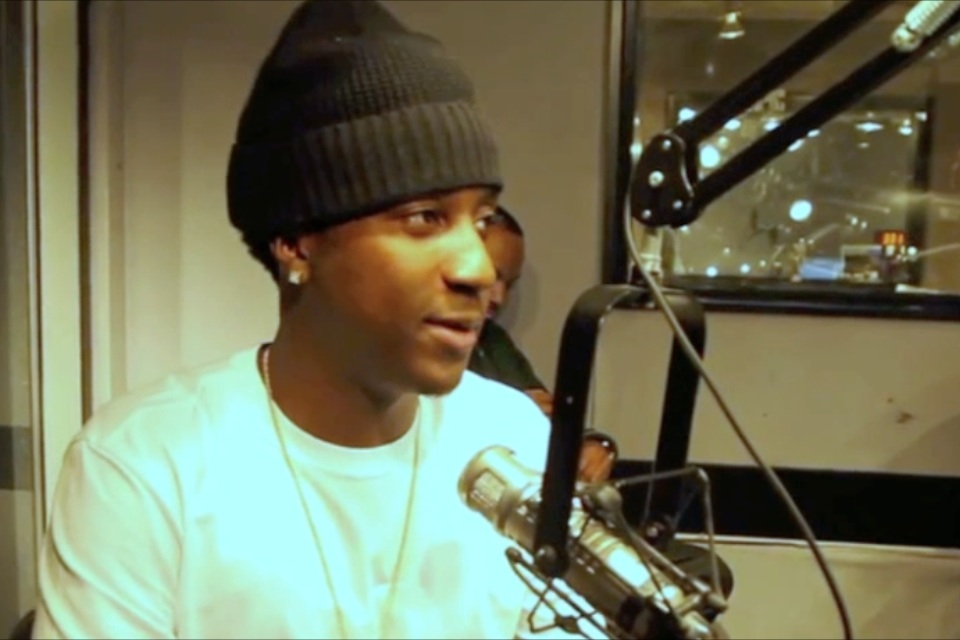
K Camp interviewed in 2014

Campbell began performing in high school, performing as part of a group called HBC (Head Busser Clique). After the group broke up, Campbell continued with music, performing at open mic contests which were also frequented by artists such as Waka Flocka Flame. He released a mix named "All Night" in 2009. It gained popularity in the Atlanta music scene and its popularity inspired Campbell to start taking music seriously. He followed up with other mixes that included "Fan4Life" and "Show Money," and "Slumlords." These mixes began a movement in Atlanta with his "slums," a term coined to represent his family, friends, and fans. Campbell increased his notoriety in the independent Atlanta rap scene after appearing as a guest feature on Kirby Tha Hottest’s “Shawty Go”. Campbell wanted to extend his career beyond the Atlanta music scene and landed a deal with Interscope Records where he released his debut EP in 2014.

In April 2014, K Camp released his debut EP In Due Time, a remake of one of his original mixtapes. Its debut single "Cut Her Off", featuring fellow Atlanta rapper 2 Chainz, peaked at number 49 on the Billboard Hot 100 chart. It was also nominated for Best Club Banger at the 2014 BET Hip Hop Awards. The song featured vocals by 2 Chainz and in addition to Billboard, the song went number 1 on USA Today's Urban Airplay chart. It was also remixed by artists that include Wiz Khalifa, Rick Ross, T.I., and YG. In 2014, five of his tracks topped the Billboard Twitter Real-Time survey, which was more than any other artist for that year. K Camp was also recognized by Rolling Stone as a "New Artist You Need To Know."

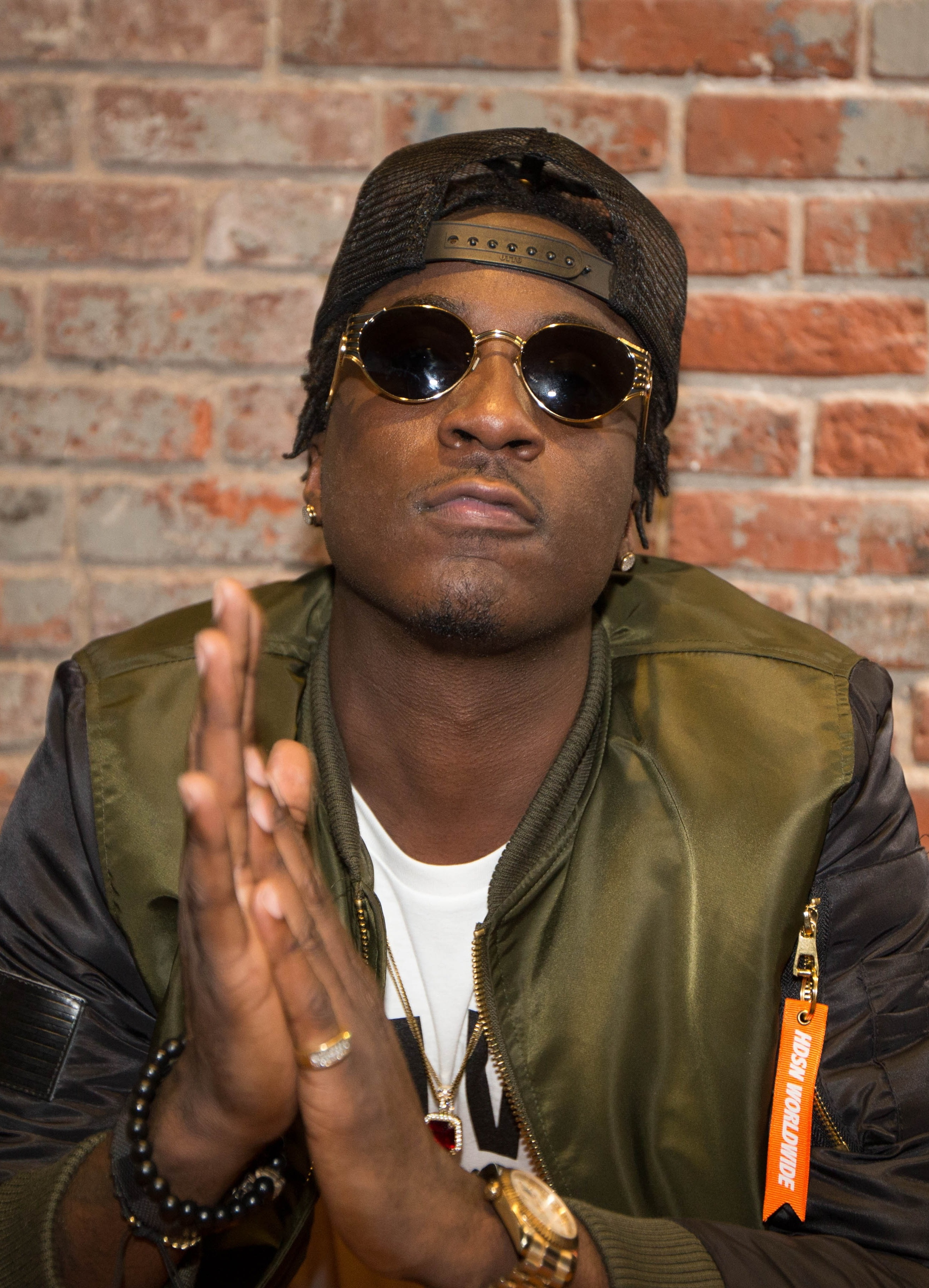
K Camp in 2015

K Camp was included in the 2015 Freshman Class by XXL Magazine, which also included artists Fetty Wap, Tink, and Vince Staples. In September 2015, he released his debut studio album, Only Way Is Up, which featured performances by Snoop Dogg, T.I., and Jeremih. The second single from the album, "Comfortable", peaked at number 54 on the Billboard Hot 100. Only Way Is Up was recognized by Spin as one of the 50 Best Hip-Hop Albums of 2015.

Multiple EP and mixtape releases followed his debut album. After being stuck in a production deal that limited his creative freedom, K Camp was eventually released from the binding deal, although he claims he was not compensated at all for his works. His second album Rare Sound, named after his own label, was released on November 2, 2018. It included the single "Can't Go Home" and had guest appearances from, amongst others, Wiz Khalifa and Lil Durk. Camp's third album Wayy 2 Kritical was released less than a year after Rare Sound, in June 2019. The album, executive produced by Camp's longtime friend and producer Bobby Kritical, highlighted Camp's "songwriting and sonic abilities". Wayy 2 Kritical includes the single "Lottery (Renegade)", for which a video was released on June 27, 2019. The song went viral online, inspiring a dance challenge on video-sharing app, TikTok. Camp gave recognition to 14-year-old choreographer Jalaiah Harmon who originated the dance craze known as the "Renegade" dance, a reference to the song's intro, which features the tag of the track's producer Reazy Renegade. On April 24, 2020, K Camp released his fourth album, Kiss Five, the fifth installment in his KISS series, which previously included mixtapes. The song "Lottery (Renegade)" was included as a bonus track. On July 3, 2020, K Camp released the album Rare Family.

== Personal life ==
In 2019, Campbell revealed that his daughter, born a year prior, died at 11 months of age.

== Discography ==
- Only Way Is Up (2015)
- RARE Sound (2018)
- Wayy 2 Kritical (2019)
- Kiss Five (2020)
- Rare Family (2020)
- Float (2021)
- Vibe Forever (2022)
- Float 2 London (2024)

== Awards and nominations ==
Year	Ceremony	Category	Work	Result
2014	BET Hip Hop Awards	Best Club Banger	"Cut Her Off" (with 2 Chainz)	Nominated
2021	iHeartRadio Music Awards	TikTok Bop of the Year	"Lottery (Renegade)"	Nominated
