= Only Way Is Up =

Studio album by K Camp
- Released: September 4, 2015
- Recorded: 2014–2015
- Genre: Hip hop
- Length: 57:09
- Label: Interscope
- Producer: Big Fruit; AP; Bobby Kritical; Deko; Honorable C.N.O.T.E.; OG Parker; Nash B; Reazy Renegade; Richie Souf

K Camp chronology
In Due Time (2014)	Only Way Is Up (2015)	RARE Sound (2018)

Singles from Only Way Is Up
- 1. "Lil Bit" Released: January 27, 2015; 2. "Comfortable" Released: June 9, 2015; 3. "1Hunnid" Released: October 30, 2015

Professional ratings
Review scores
Source	Rating
AllMusic	3.5/5 stars
HipHopDX	3.5/5 stars

Only Way Is Up is the debut studio album by American rapper K Camp. It was released on September 4, 2015, by Interscope Records. The album was preceded by the singles: "Lil Bit", "Comfortable" and "1Hunnid".

== Singles ==
The album's lead single, "Lil Bit" was released on January 27, 2015.

The album's second single, "Comfortable" was released on June 9, 2015.

== Commercial performance ==
The album debuted at number 20 on the Billboard 200 with 18,000 equivalent album units, selling 11,000 copies in its first week of availability in the United States.

== Track listing ==
Only Way Is Up track listing
No.	Title	Writer(s)	Producer(s)	Length
1.	"Change" (featuring Jeremih)	Kristopher Campbell; Kelvin Brown; Jeremih Felton	Nash B	5:49
2.	"Till I Die" (featuring T.I.)	Campbell; Leland Clopton; Clifford Harris, Jr.	Big Fruit	3:44
3.	"Yellow Brick Road"	Campbell; Clopton; Carlton Mays, Jr.; Harry McKee, Jr.	Big Fruit; Honorable C.N.O.T.E.	4:09
4.	"Lil Bit"	Campbell; Clopton; Adam Pierce	Big Fruit; AP	3:57
5.	"Own Boss"	Campbell; Clopton	Big Fruit	4:28
6.	"This Way"	Campbell; Bryan Johnson	Reazy Renegade	3:54
7.	"Who Am I" (featuring Yo Gotti)	Campbell; Clopton; Felton; Mario Mims	Big Fruit	5:01
8.	"Money I Made" (featuring French Montana and Genius)	Campbell; Tony Son; Karim Kharbouch; Elliston Clarke, Jr.	Richie Souf	3:20
9.	"Comfortable"	Campbell; Clopton; Demar Jackson; Tunji Balogun	Big Fruit	3:31
10.	"Bitches n That Coupe" (featuring Bun B)	Campbell; Clopton; Bobby Turner; Bernard Freeman	Big Fruit; Bobby Kritical	4:36
11.	"Rolling" (featuring Snoop Dogg)	Campbell; Mays, Jr.; Michael Akiko; Calvin Broadus	Honorable C.N.O.T.E.	4:43
12.	"I'm Good"	Campbell; Clopton; Turner	Big Fruit; Bobby Kritical	6:09
13.	"Control"	Campbell; Johnson	Reazy Renegade	3:48

Deluxe edition (bonus tracks)
No.	Title	Writer(s)	Producer(s)	Length
14.	"Let's Get Money" (featuring CyHi the Prynce)	Campbell; Johnson; Cydel Young	Reazy Renegade	4:04
15.	"1Hunnid" (featuring Fetty Wap)	Campbell; Grant Decouto; Joshua Parker; Willie Maxwell II	Deko; OG Parker	3:35
16.	"Above Water" (featuring Marian Mereba)	Campbell; Turner; Denisa Andrews; Marian Mereba	Bobby Kritical	3:54

- (*) indicates additional producer

== Charts ==
=== Weekly charts ===
Chart (2015)	Peak position
US Billboard 200	20
US Top R&B/Hip-Hop Albums (Billboard)	5

=== Year-end charts ===
Chart (2015)	Position
US Top R&B/Hip-Hop Albums (Billboard)	98
