= Marc-André Hamelin discography =

This is a sortable discography of French Canadian pianist and composer Marc-André Hamelin. He records exclusively for the Hyperion label, although he has recorded for other labels in the past. In addition to the works of commonly heard composers, he has recorded a great deal of non-standard repertoire, such as music of Charles-Valentin Alkan, Leopold Godowsky, Georgy Catoire, Sophie Carmen Eckhardt-Gramatté, as well as his own compositions.

== Audio recordings ==
| Year of issue | Album details | Recording date(s) | Record label |
|---|---|---|---|
| 2024 | Marc-André Hamelin: New Piano Works: Variations on a Theme of Paganini; My Feelings About Chocolate; Suite à l'Ancienne (Suite in Old Form); Barcarolle; Variation Diabellique sur des Thèmes de Beethoven; Pavane Variée; Chaconne; Meditation on Laura; Toccata on L'Homme Armé | January 2023 | Hyperion |
| 2023 | Gabriel Fauré: Nocturnes & Barcarolles | 2022 | Hyperion |
| 2018 | The Rotterdam Philharmonic Orchestra Collection; Yannick Nézet-Séguin (conductor), Rotterdam Philharmonic Orchestra: Mark-Anthony Turnage: Concerto for Piano (2013) | 2013 | Deutsche Grammophon |
| 2018 | Schubert: Piano Sonata, D. 960 - 4 Impromptus, D. 935: Sonata for Piano in B-flat Major, D. 960 (1828); 4 Impromptus for Piano, D. 935/Op. 142 (1827) | May 2017 | Hyperion |
| 2018 | Stravinsky: Rite of Spring & Other Works for 2 Pianos; with Leif Ove Andsnes: Le sacre du printemps (1911-13); Concerto for 2 Pianos (1935); 4 Etudes for Piano, Op. 7: No. 4, Vivo (1908); Tango (1940); Circus Polka (1942) | April 2017 | Hyperion |
| 2017 | Baker: Piano Concerto "From Noon to Starry Night"; Gilbert Varga (conductor), Indianapolis Symphony Orchestra: Concerto for Piano and Orchestra "From Noon to Starry Night" | January 2011 | Naxos |
| 2017 | Feldman: For Bunita Marcus: For Bunita Marcus (1985) | June 2016 | Hyperion |
| 2017 | Medtner & Rachmaninov: Piano Concertos; Vladimir Jurowski (conductor), London Philharmonic Orchestra: Medtner: Concerto for Piano No. 2 in C minor, Op. 50; Rachmaninov: Concerto for Piano No. 3 in D minor, Op. 30 (1909) | Various | Hyperion |
| 2016 | Franck: Piano Quintet, Debussy: String Quartet; with Takács Quartet: Franck: Quintet for Piano and Strings in F minor, M. 7 (1879); Debussy: Quartet for Strings in G minor, Op. 10 (1893) | May 2015 | Hyperion |
| 2015 | Leo Ornstein: Piano Quintet • String Quartet No. 2; with Pacifica Quartet: Piano Quintet, Op. 92, SO 610 (1927) | April 2014 | Hyperion |
| 2015 | Shostakovich: Piano Quintet & String Quartet No. 2; with Takács Quartet: Piano Quintet in G minor, Op. 57 (1940) | May 2014 | Hyperion |
| 2015 | Mozart: Piano Sonatas (2 CDs): Piano Sonata No. 4 in E♭ major, K 282; Piano Sonata No. 5 in G major, K 283; Piano Sonata No. 10 in C major, K 330; Piano Sonata No. 12 in F major, K 332; Piano Sonata No. 13 in B♭ major, K 333; Piano Sonata No. 16 in C major, K 545; Piano Sonata No. 17 in B♭ major, K 570; Piano Sonata No. 18 in D major, K 576; Fantasia in D minor, K 397; Gigue in G major, K 574; Rondo in D major, K485; Rondo in A minor, K 511 | July 2013 | Hyperion |
| 2014 | Debussy: Images & Préludes II: Images, Book I, L 110 (1905); Images, Book II, L 111 (1907); Préludes, Book II, L 123 (1912–1913) | April 2011 (Préludes); August 2012 (Images) | Hyperion |
| 2014 | Schumann: Kinderszenen & Waldszenen • Janáček: On an Overgrown Path I: Leoš Janáček: On an Overgrown Path (Po zarostlém chodníčku), Book I, JW 8/17 (1901–1908); Robert Schumann: Waldszenen (Forest Scenes), Op. 82 (1848–1849); Robert Schumann: Kinderszenen (Scenes from Childhood), Op. 15 (1838) | March 2013 | Hyperion |
| 2013 | Busoni: Late Piano Music (3 CDs): 3 Albumleaves (3 Albumblätter), BV289 (1917, 1921); An die Jugend, Book 3: Giga, bolero e variazione, BV254 (1909); Elegies, BV249 (1907–1909); Fantasia after J.S. Bach (Fantasia nach Johann Sebastian Bach), BV253 (1909); previously released on The Composer-Pianists (1998); Canonic Variations and Fugue (on the Theme by King Frederick the Great) from J.S. Bach's The Musical Offering, BVB40 (1916); Indianisches Erntelied (1911); Indianisches Tagebuch I, BV267 (1915); Kammer-Fantasie über Carmen (Sonatina No. 6), BV284 (1920); Klavierübung (1925); Allegro Motive: Allegro risoluto Perpetuum mobile, BV293 (1922) Preludio: Allegro festivo Preludio: Without the Third Finger, Moderato alla breve 7 Short Pieces for the Cultivation of Polyphonic Playing (Kurze Stücke zur Pflege des polyphonen Spiels auf dem Pianoforte), BV296 (1923) 9 Variations on a Chopin Prelude (Variationen über ein Präludium von Chopin), BV213a (1922) Variations-Studie nach Mozart I Veloce e leggiero Vivace moderato, con precisione: Nuit de Noël, BV251 (1908); Prélude et étude en arpèges, BV297 (1923); Prologo, BV279 (1918); Sonatina (No. 1), BV257 (1910); Sonatina seconda, BV259 (1912); Sonatina (No. 3) ad usum infantis Madeline M* Americanae, BV268 (1915); Sonatina (No. 4) in diem nativitatis Christi MCMXVII, BV274 (1917); Sonatina brevis (No. 5) in signo Joannis Sebastiani Magni, BV280 (1918); Toccata: Preludio, Fantasia, and Ciaccona, BV287 (1920) | April 2011; August 2012; January 1998 (Fantasia after Bach) | Hyperion |
| 2013 | Haydn: Piano Concertos Nos 3, 4 & 11: Piano Concerto in D major, Hob XVIII:11; Piano Concerto in F major, Hob XVIII:3; Piano Concerto in G major, Hob XVIII:4 | October 2012 | Hyperion |
| 2012 | Haydn: Piano Sonatas, Volume 3 (2 CDs): Sonata in G major, Hob XVI:6; Sonata in C major, Hob XVI:1; Sonata in B♭ major, Hob XVI:2; Sonata in E minor, Hob XVI:47bis Add.; Sonata in G minor, Hob XVI:44; Sonata in E♭ major, Hob XVI:25; Sonata in C minor, Hob XVI:20; Sonata in C♯ minor, Hob XVI:36; Sonata in E major, Hob XVI:22; Sonata in F major, Hob XVI:29; Sonata in D major, Hob XVI:51 | August 2011 | Hyperion |
| 2011 | Liszt: Piano Sonata: Fantasie und Fuge über das Thema B-A-C-H, S.529ii; Bénédiction de Dieu dans la solitude, No. 3 from Harmonies poétiques et religieuses, S.173 (1847); Venezia e Napoli: Supplement to Années de pèlerinage, Deuxième année: Italie, S.162; Piano Sonata in B minor, S.178 | August 2010 | Hyperion |
| 2011 | Reger & Strauss – The Romantic Piano Concerto, Vol. 53; Ilan Volkov (conductor), Rundfunk-Sinfonieorchester Berlin: Max Reger: Piano Concerto in F minor, Op. 114 (1910); Richard Strauss: Burleske in D minor (1890) | March 2010 | Hyperion |
| 2010 | Marc-André Hamelin: Études: 12 Études in All the Minor Keys (1986–2009); 1. in A minor "Triple Étude, after Chopin" (1992); 2. in E minor "Coma Berenices" (2008); 3. in B minor "after Paganini-Liszt" (1993); 4. in C minor "Étude à mouvement perpétuellement semblable, after Alkan" (2005); 5. in G minor "Toccata grottesca" (2008); 6. in D minor "Esercizio per pianoforte, Omaggio a Domenico Scarlatti" (1992); 7. in E♭ minor "after Tchaikovsky, for the left hand alone" (2006); 8. in B♭ minor "Erlkönig, after Goethe" (2007); 9. in F minor "after Rossini" (1987); 10. in F♯ minor "after Chopin" (1990); 11. in C♯ minor "Minuetto" (2009); 12. in A♭ minor "Prelude and Fugue" (1986); Little Nocturne (2007); Con intimissimo sentimento (1986–2000); No. 1 Ländler I No. 4 Album Leaf No. 5 Music Box No. 6 After Pergolesi No. 7 Berceuse, in tempore belli: Theme and Variations (Cathy's Variations) (2007) | January 1998; August 2008; May, November 2009 | Hyperion |
| 2009 | Chopin: Piano Sonatas Nos. 2 & 3: Sonata No. 2 in B♭ minor, Op. 35 (1839); Sonata No. 3 in B minor, Op. 58 (1844); 2 Nocturnes, Op. 27 (1836); Berceuse, Op. 57 (1843–1844); Barcarolle, Op. 60 (1845–1846) | March 2008 | Hyperion |
| 2009 | Haydn: Piano Sonatas, Volume 2 (2 CDs): Sonata in A major, Hob XVI:26; Sonata in E major, Hob XVI:31; Sonata in D major, Hob XVI:33; Sonata in E minor, Hob XVI:34; Sonata in C major, Hob XVI:35; Sonata in G major, Hob XVI:39; Sonata in D major, Hob XVI:42; Sonata in C major, Hob XVI:48; Sonata in E♭ major, Hob XVI:49; Fantasia in C major "Capriccio", Hob XVII:4; Variations in F minor "Un piccolo divertimento", Hob XVII:6 | August 2008 | Hyperion |
| 2009 | Schumann: String Quartet & Piano Quintet; with Takács Quartet: String Quartet in A major, Op. 41 No. 3 (1842); Piano Quintet in E♭ major, Op. 44 (1842); Hamelin appears in the Quintet only | May 2009 | Hyperion |
| 2008 | Godowsky: Strauss Transcriptions and Other Waltzes: Symphonische Metamorphosen Johann Strauss’scher Themen (Symphonic Metamorphosis of Themes from Johann Strauss II); 1. Künstlerleben (Artists' Life), Op. 316 (1867); 2. Die Fledermaus; 3. Wein, Weib und Gesang (Wine, Women and Song), Op. 333 (1869); Leopold Godowsky: Walzermasken (1912); No. 2 Pastell No. 14: Französisch No. 22: Wienerisch No. 24: Portrait—Joh. Str.: Leopold Godowsky: Triakontameron (1920); No. 4 Rendezvous No. 11 Alt Wien No. 13 Terpsichorean Vindobona No. 21 The Salon No. 25 Memories: Waltz from Der letzte Walzer (1920) by Oscar Straus | December 2007 | Hyperion |
| 2008 | In a State of Jazz: Friedrich Gulda: Prelude and Fugue (1965); Friedrich Gulda: Jazz Sonata; Friedrich Gulda: Exercises Nos. 1, 4 and 5 from Play Piano Play (1971); Nikolai Kapustin: Sonata for Piano No. 2, Op. 54 (1989); Alexis Weissenberg: Sonate en état de jazz (Sonata in a State of Jazz) (1982); Alexis Weissenberg: Improvisations on Songs Sung by Charles Trenet; Coin de rue by Charles Trenet Vous oubliez votre cheval by Charles Trenet and Arcady Brachlianoff En Avril, à Paris by Charles Trenet and Walter Eiger Boum! by Charles Trenet Vous qui passez sans me voir by Johnny Hess and Paul Misraki Ménilmontant by Charles Trenet: George Antheil: Piano Sonata No. 4 "Jazz Sonata" (1922–1923) | July 2007 | Hyperion |
| 2007 | Alkan: Concerto for Solo Piano • Troisième recueil de chants: Concerto for Solo Piano, Nos. 8-10 from Douze Études dans tous les tons mineurs, Op. 39 (1857); Troisième recueil de chants, Op. 65 (1869) | February, December 2006 | Hyperion |
| 2007 | Das Klavier-Festival Ruhr 2007 in der neuen Mercatorhalle Duisburg (The Ruhr Piano Festival 2007 in Duisburg's New Mercator Hall) (2 CDs); Steven Sloane (conductor); Bochum Sinfoniker: Saint-Saëns: Piano Concerto No. 5 in F major, Op. 103 (1896); Franz Liszt: Totentanz: Paraphrase über "Dies irae", S.126 | June 2007 | AVI Ruhr; Edition Klavier-Festival Ruhr, Volume 18 |
| 2007 | Haydn: Piano Sonatas, Volume 1 (2 CDs): Sonata in F major, Hob XVI:23; Sonata in D major, Hob XVI:24; Sonata in B minor, Hob XVI:32; Sonata in D major, Hob XVI:37; Sonata in G major, Hob XVI:40; Sonata in B♭ major, Hob XVI:41; Sonata in A♭ major, Hob XVI:43; Sonata in A♭ major, Hob XVI:46; Sonata in C major, Hob XVI:50; Sonata in E♭ major, Hob XVI:52 | December 2005 | Hyperion |
| 2006 | Brahms: Piano Concerto No. 2; Andrew Litton (conductor); Dallas Symphony Orchestra: Piano Concerto No. 2 in B♭ major, Op. 83 (1881); Four Piano Pieces, Op. 119 (1893) | January, February 2006 | Hyperion |
| 2006 | Brahms: Piano Quartets; Leopold String Trio (2 CDs): Piano Quartet No. 1 in G minor, Op. 25 (1861); Piano Quartet No. 2 in A major, Op. 26 (1861); Piano Quartet No. 3 in C minor, Op. 60 (1875); 3 Intermezzos for piano solo, Op. 117 (1892) | July 2005 | Hyperion |
| 2006 | Dukas: Piano Sonata • Decaux: Clairs de Lune: Paul Dukas: Piano Sonata in E♭ minor (1900); Abel Decaux: Clairs de lune (1900–1907) | August 2004; December 2005 | Hyperion |
| 2006 | Medtner: Forgotten Melodies I, II: Forgotten Melodies I, Op. 38 (1919–1922); Forgotten Melodies II, Op. 39 (1919–1922); 2 Skazki, Op. 8 (1904–1905) | August 1996 | Hyperion |
| 2005 | Albéniz: Iberia (2 CDs): Iberia, 4 Books (1905–1908); La Vega (1897); Yvonne en visite! (1909); España: Souvenirs (1897); Navarra (1909); version completed by William Bolcom | August 2004 | Hyperion |
| 2005 | Rubinstein & Scharwenka – The Romantic Piano Concerto, Vol. 38; Michael Stern (conductor); BBC Scottish Symphony Orchestra: Xaver Scharwenka: Piano Concerto No. 1 in B♭ minor, Op. 32 (1876); Anton Rubinstein: Piano Concerto No. 4 in D minor, Op. 70 (1864) | February 2005 | Hyperion |
| 2005 | Schumann: Carnaval • Fantasiestücke • Papillons: Papillons, Op. 2 (1829–1831); Fantasiestücke (Fantasy Pieces), Op. 12 (1837); Carnaval, Op. 9 (1834–1835) | December 1999; August 2002 | Hyperion |
| 2004 | Barber: Piano Sonata • Ives: Concord Sonata: Charles Ives: Piano Sonata No. 2 "Concord Sonata" (1904–1915, 1947); Samuel Barber: Piano Sonata in E♭ minor, Op. 26 (1949) | April 2004 | Hyperion |
| 2004 | Kapustin: Piano Music, Volume 2: Variations, Op. 41 (1984); 8 Concert Études, Op. 40 (1984); Bagatelle, Op. 59 No. 9 (1991); Suite in the Old Style, Op. 28 (1977); Piano Sonata No. 6, Op. 62 (1991); Sonatina, Op. 100 (2000); 5 Études in Different Intervals, Op. 68 (1992) | June 2003 | Hyperion |
| 2003 | Shostakovich & Shchedrin Piano Concertos; Andrew Litton (conductor); BBC Scottish Symphony Orchestra: Dmitri Shostakovich: Piano Concerto No. 1 in C minor, Op. 35 (1933); Dmitri Shostakovich: Piano Concerto No. 2 in F major, Op. 102 (1957); Rodion Shchedrin: Piano Concerto No. 2 (1966) | April 2003 | Hyperion |
| 2003 | Szymanowski: The Complete Mazurkas: 20 Mazurkas, Op. 50 (1924–1925); Valse romantique (1925); 4 Polish Dances (1926); 2 Mazurkas, Op. 62 (1933–1934) | August 2002 | Hyperion |
| 2002 | Godowsky: Sonata & Passacaglia: Piano Sonata in E minor (1910–1911); Passacaglia: 44 Variations, Cadenza and Fugue on the Opening of Schubert's "Unfinished Symphony" (1927) | August 2001 | Hyperion |
| 2002 | Liszt: Paganini Studies • Schubert Transcriptions: Grandes études de Paganini, S.141; Franz Schuberts Märsche für das Pianoforte übertragen (3 Marches on Themes of Franz Schubert), S.426 (1846) | February 2002 | Hyperion |
| 2002 | Ornstein: Piano Music: Suicide in an airplane; Impressions de la Tamise, Op. 13 No. 1; Danse sauvage, Op. 13 No. 2; À la Chinoise, Op. 39; Poems of 1917, Op. 41 (1917); Arabesques, Op. 42 (1921); Piano Sonata No. 8 (1990) | August 2001 | Hyperion |
| 2001 | Alkan: Symphony for Solo Piano • Trois morceaux dans le genre pathétique: Symphony for Solo Piano, Nos. 4-7 from Douze Études dans tous les tons mineurs, Op. 39 (1857); Salut, cendre du pauvre!, Op. 45 (1856); Alleluia, Op. 25 (1844); Super flumina Babylonis, Paraphrase du Psaume 137, Op. 52 (1859); Souvenirs: Trois morceaux dans le genre pathétique (Souvenirs: Three Pieces in the Pathetic Style), Op. 15 (1837) | August 2000 | Hyperion |
| 2001 | Kaleidoscope: Edna Bentz Woods: Valse phantastique (1924); Sergei Rachmaninoff: Polka de W.R. (1911), transcription of Lachtäubchen (Scherzpolka) by Franz Behr; Josef Hofmann: Nocturne "Complaint" (Lament) from Mignonettes; Josef Hofmann: Kaleidoskop, No. 4 from Charakterskizzen, Op. 40 (1908); Marc-André Hamelin: Étude No. 3 in B minor "after Paganini-Liszt" (1993); Felix Blumenfeld: Étude pour la main gauche seule, Op. 36; Jakob Gimpel: The Song of the Soldiers of the Sea (The Marines' Hymn), Concert Paraphrase after Jacques Offenbach (1942); Marc-André Hamelin: Étude No. 6 in D minor "Esercizio per pianoforte, Omaggio a Domenico Scarlatti" (1992); Jules Massenet: Valse folle (1898); Moritz Moszkowski: Études de virtuosité in A♭ minor, Op. 72 No. 13; Francis Poulenc: Intermezzo in A♭ (1943); Leopold Godowsky: Alt Wien, No. 11 from Triakontameron (1919); Aleksander Michałowski: Étude d'après l'Impromptu en la bémol majeur de Fr. Chopin, Op. 29; Arthur-Vincent Lourié: Gigue, No. 4 from Quatre Pièces (1927); Émile-Robert Blanchet: Au jardin du vieux sérail "Adrianople", No. 3 from Turquie, Op. 18 (1913); Alfredo Casella: Deux Contrastes (1916–1918); 1. Grazioso "Hommage à Chopin"; 2. Antigrazioso; John Vallier: Toccatina (1950); Marc-André Hamelin: Petit adagio (2001), transcription from The Seasons by Alexander Glazunov; Nikolai Kapustin: Toccatina, Op. 36 | February 2001 | Hyperion |
| 2001 | Schumann: Fantasie • Études symphoniques • Piano Sonata No. 2: Fantasie in C major, Op. 17 (1836, revised 1839); Piano Sonata No. 2 in G minor, Op. 22 (1833–1835); Études symphoniques (Symphonic Studies), Op. 13 (1834) | August, December 1999 | Hyperion |
| 2000 | Bernstein: The Age of Anxiety • Bolcom: Piano Concerto; Dmitry Sitkovetsky (conductor); Ulster Orchestra: Leonard Bernstein: Symphony No. 2 The Age of Anxiety for piano and orchestra (1949, revised 1965); William Bolcom: Concerto for Piano and Large Orchestra (1976) | January 2000 | Hyperion |
| 2000 | Godowsky: The Complete Studies on Chopin's Études (2 CDs): 53 Studies on Chopin's Études (1894–1914) | October 1999 | Hyperion |
| 2000 | Villa-Lobos: Piano Music: As três Marias; Prole do bebê 1 (The Baby's Family, Suite 1: The Dolls); Prole do bebê 2 (The Baby's Family, Suite 2: The Little Animals); Rudepoêma (1921–1926) | August, October 1999 | Hyperion |
| 1999 | Busoni – The Romantic Piano Concerto, Vol. 22; Mark Elder (conductor); City of Birmingham Symphony Orchestra: Ferruccio Busoni: Piano Concerto in C major, Op. 39 (1901–1904) | June 1999 | Hyperion |
| 1999 | Catoire: Piano Music: Caprice, Op. 3; Intermezzo, Op. 6 No. 5; Trois Morceaux, Op. 2; Six Morceaux, Op. 6; No. 2: Prélude, No. 3: Scherzo; Vision "Étude", Op. 8; Cinq Morceaux, Op. 10; Quatre Morceaux, Op. 12; Quatre Préludes, Op. 17; Chants du crépuscule, Op. 24; Quatre Morceaux, Op. 34; No. 2: Poème, No. 3: Prélude; Valse, Op. 36 | November 1998 | Hyperion |
| 1999 | Reger: Piano Music: Variations and Fugue on a Theme of Johann Sebastian Bach, Op. 81 (1904); 5 Humoresques, Op. 20 (1898); Variations and Fugue on a Theme of Georg Philipp Telemann, Op. 134 (1914) | April 1998 | Hyperion |
| 1999 | Rzewski: The People United Will Never Be Defeated!: The People United Will Never Be Defeated! (1975); Down by the Riverside, No. 3 from North American Ballads (1979); Winnsboro Cotton Mill Blues, No. 4 from North American Ballads (1979) | April 1998 | Hyperion |
| 1999 | Strauss: Enoch Arden for narrator and piano, Op. 38 (1897); Jon Vickers (reciter) | June 2, 1998 | VAI Audio |
| 1998 | The Composer-Pianists: Charles-Valentin Alkan: Haydn Andante from Symphony No. 94 (transcription); Charles-Valentin Alkan: Le Premier Billet Doux from Esquisses, Op. 63 No. 46; Charles-Valentin Alkan: Scherzetto from Esquisses, Op. 63 No. 47; Ferruccio Busoni: Fantasia nach J. S. Bach; Samuil Feinberg: Bach Schübler Chorale No. 6: "Kommst du nun, Jesu, vom Himmel herunter" (transcription); Samuil Feinberg: Berceuse, Op. 19a; Leopold Godowsky: Toccata in G♭ major, Op. 13; Marc-André Hamelin: Etude No. 9 d'après Rossini; Marc-André Hamelin: Etude No. 10 d'après Chopin ('pour les idées noires'); Marc-André Hamelin: Prelude and Fugue (Etude No. 12) (1986); Nikolai Medtner: Improvisation No. 1 in B♭ minor from Trois Morceaux, Op. 31 No. 1; Sergei Rachmaninoff: Moment Musical in E♭ minor, Op. 16 No. 2; Sergei Rachmaninoff: Étude-tableaux in E♭ major, Op. 33 No. 4; Alexander Scriabin: Poème tragique, Op. 34; Alexander Scriabin: Deux poèmes, Op. 71; Kaikhosru Shapurji Sorabji: Pastiche on the Hindu Merchant's Song from Sadko by Nikolai Rimsky-Korsakov | January 1998 | Hyperion |
| 1998 | Medtner: The Complete Piano Sonatas • Forgotten Melodies I, II (4 CDs): Sonata in F minor Op. 5 (1895–1903); 2 Skazki, Op. 8 (1904–1905); Sonaten-Triade Op. 11 (1904–1907); Sonata in G minor, Op. 22 (1901–1910); Sonata-Skaska in C minor, Op. 25 No. 1 (1910–1911); Sonata in E minor "Night Wind", Op. 25 No. 2 (1910–1911); Sonata-Ballada in F♯ major, Op. 27 (1912–1914); Sonata in A minor, Op. 30 (1914); Forgotten Melodies I, Op. 38 (1919–1922); Forgotten Melodies II, Op. 39 (1919–1922); Sonata Romantica in B♭ minor, Op. 53 No. 1 (1929–1930); Sonata Minacciosa in F minor, Op. 53 No. 2 (1929–1931); Sonata-Idylle in G major, Op. 56 (1935–1937) | August 1996 | Hyperion |
| 1998 | Korngold & Marx – The Romantic Piano Concerto, Vol. 18; Osmo Vänskä (conductor); BBC Scottish Symphony Orchestra: Joseph Marx: Romantisches Klavierkonzert in E major (1919–1920); Erich Wolfgang Korngold: Piano Concerto in C♯ for the left hand, Op. 17 (1923) | June 1997 | Hyperion |
| 1997 | Liszt: Marc-André Hamelin plays Liszt; recorded live at Wigmore Hall, London: Senza lentezza quasi allegretto, No. 1 from Apparitions, S. 155 (1834); Waldesrauschen (Forest Murmurs), No. 1 from Zwei Konzertetüden, S. 145 (1862–1863); Un sospiro in D♭ major, No. 3 from Three Concert Études, S. 144 (1848?); Hungarian Rhapsodies, S. 244; No. 2 in C♯ minor (1847); cadenza by Marc-André Hamelin No. 10 in E major (1847) No. 13 in A minor (1847): Nuages gris, S. 199 (1881); En rêve – Nocturne, S. 207 (1885); Réminiscences de "Don Juan" de Mozart – Grande fantaisie, S. 418 (1841) | January 14, 1996 | Hyperion |
| 1997 | Roslavets: Piano Music: Piano Sonata No. 1 (1914); Prelude (1919 or 1921); 2 Compositions (1915); Piano Sonata No. 2 (1916); 2 Poems (1920); 5 Preludes (1919–1922); Piano Sonata No. 5 (1923) | August 1996 | Hyperion |
| 1996 | Grainger: Piano Music: British Folk-Music Settings; No. 4 Shepherd's Hey No. 6 Londonderry Air No. 19 Molly on the Shore (1907) No. 22 Country Gardens (1918) No. 37 Scotch Strathspey and Reel No. 38 The Merry King: Colonial Song, No. 1 from Sentimentals (1911); Harvest Hymn; The Hunter in His Career, No. 4 from Old-English Popular Music; In Dahomey 'Cakewalk Smasher; 4 Irish Dances by Charles Villiers Stanford, arrangement by Grainger; No. 1 A March-Jig 'Maguire's Kick No. 4 A Reel: Jutish Medley, No. 8 from Danish Folk-Music Settings; March: The Gum-Suckers from In a Nutshell; Ramble on Love from Der Rosenkavalier by Richard Strauss, arrangement by Grainger; Room-Music Tit-Bits; No. 1 Mock Morris No. 2 Handel in the Strand No. 3 Walking Tune: Spoon River, No. 1 from American Folk-Music Settings | January 1996 | Hyperion |
| 1996 | Scriabin: The Complete Piano Sonatas (2 CDs): Piano Sonata No. 1 in F minor, Op. 6 (1892); Piano Sonata No. 2 "Sonata-Fantasy" in G♯ minor, Op. 19 (1897); Piano Sonata No. 3 in F♯ minor, Op. 23 (1897–1898); Piano Sonata No. 4 in F♯ major, Op. 30 (1903); Piano Sonata No. 5, Op. 53 (1907); Piano Sonata No. 6, Op. 62 (1911); Piano Sonata No. 7 "Messe blanche", Op. 64 (1911); Piano Sonata No. 8, Op. 66 (1912–1913); Piano Sonata No. 9 "Messe noire", Op. 68 (1912–1913); Piano Sonata No. 10, Op. 70 (1913); Fantaisie, Op. 28 (1900); Sonate-fantaisie in G sharp minor, Op. posthumous (1886) | June 1995 | Hyperion |
| 1995 | Alkan: Grande sonate 'Les quatre âges' • Sonatine • Le festin d'Ésope: Grande sonate 'Les quatre âges', Op. 33 (1847); Sonatine, Op. 61 (1861); Barcarolle, No. 6 from Troisième recueil de chants, Op. 65 (1869); Le festin d'Ésope, No. 12 from Douze Études dans tous les tons mineurs, Op. 39 (1857) | November 1994 | Hyperion |
| 1994 | Alkan & Henselt – The Romantic Piano Concerto, Vol. 07; Martyn Brabbins (conductor); BBC Scottish Symphony Orchestra: Adolf von Henselt: Piano Concerto in F minor, Op. 16 (1844); Adolf von Henselt: Variations de concert, Op. 11 (1840); Charles-Valentin Alkan: Concerto da camera in C♯ minor, Op. 10 No. 2 (1833); Charles-Valentin Alkan: Concerto da camera in A minor, Op. 10 No. 1 (1832) | December 1993 | Hyperion |
| 1994 | Marc-André Hamelin Live at Wigmore Hall: Ludwig van Beethoven: Allegro con brio, Movement I from Piano Concerto No. 3 in C minor, Op. 37; arrangement by Charles-Valentin Alkan; Frédéric Chopin: Romanza, Movement II from Piano Concerto No. 1 in E minor, Op. 11; arrangement by Mili Balakirev; Charles-Valentin Alkan: Trois Grandes Études, Op. 76; 1. Fantaisie in A♭ major for the left hand 2. Introduction, variations et finale in D major for the right hand 3. Mouvement semblable et perpetuel (Rondo-Toccata) in C minor for hands reunited; Ferruccio Busoni: Sonatina No. 6 "Kammer-Fantasie über Carmen", BV284 (1920); Nikolai Medtner: Danza festiva, No. 3 from Forgotten Melodies I, Op. 38 (1919–1922) | June 1994 | Hyperion |
| 1994 | Rachmaninov • Villa-Lobos • Chopin • Schulz-Evler: Sergei Rachmaninoff: Piano Sonata No. 2 in B♭ minor (revised version), Op. 36 (1913, revised 1931); Heitor Villa-Lobos: Rudepoêma (1921–1926); Frédéric Chopin: Piano Sonata No. 2 in B♭ minor, Op. 35 (1839); Adolf Schulz-Evler: Arabesques, Variations on "The Blue Danube Waltz" by Johann Strauss II, Op. 12 | September 1994 | Port-Royal; ISBA Classic |
| 1994 | Strauss & Thuille: Cello Sonatas; Sophie Rolland (cello): Richard Strauss: Sonata in F major for cello and piano, Op. 6 (1882); Ludwig Thuille: Sonata for cello and piano, Op. 22 (1902) | 1994 | ASV |
| 1993 | Liszt: Grand Romantic Virtuoso: Réminiscences de Norma, Paraphrase after Vincenzo Bellini, S. 394 (1841–43); Concert Études, S. 144 (1848?); No. 2 La leggierezza in F minor No. 3 Un sospiro in D♭ major: Polonaise No. 2 in E major, S. 223 (1851); Bénédiction de Dieu dans la solitude, No. 3 from Harmonies poétiques et religieuses, S.173 (1847); Réminiscences de "Don Juan" de Mozart – Grande fantaisie, S. 418 (1841) | January, February 1991 | Music & Arts |
| 1993 | Louise Bessette, Marc-André Hamelin; with Louise Bessette (piano); Vincent Dhavernas, Julien Grégoire (percussion): Roger Matton: Danse brésilienne for 2 pianos (1946); Roger Matton: Concerto for 2 pianos and percussion (1955); André Prévost: Quatre préludes for 2 pianos (1961); Marc-André Hamelin: Prélude et fugue (Étude No. 12) for piano solo (1986) | December 1992 | Doberman-Yppan |
| 1993, 2008 | Martinů: Chamber Music; Marc-André Hamelin (piano, harpsichord); Alain Marion (flute); Angèle Dubeau (violin): Sonata for flute, violin and piano, H 254 (1937); Promenades for flute, violin and harpsichord, H 274 (1939); Sonata for flute and piano, H 306 (1945); 5 Madrigal Stanzas for violin and piano, H 297 (1943); Scherzo for flute and piano, H 174a (1929); Madrigal-Sonata for flute, violin and piano, H 291 (1942) | July 1993 | Analekta |
| 1993 | Maurice Wright: The Music of Maurice Wright; Jody Karin Applebaum (soprano): Suite for Piano (1983); Chamber Symphony for piano and electronics (1977); Night Watch for soprano and piano (1978); Sonata II for piano (1991) | 1993 | Composers Recordings, Inc. |
| 1992 | Alkan: Concerto for Solo Piano: Concerto for Solo Piano, Nos. 8-10 from Douze Études dans tous les tons mineurs, Op. 39 (1857) | | Music & Arts |
| 1991 | Sophie Carmen Eckhardt-Gramatté: Complete Piano Sonatas (2 CDs): Piano Sonata No. 1, E. 45 (1923); Piano Sonata No. 2 "Die Biscaya Sonate", E. 46 (1923); Piano Sonata No. 3, E. 52 (1924); Piano Sonata No. 4 "Die befreite Sonate", E. 68 (1927–1931); Piano Sonata No. 5 "Klavierstück", E. 126 (1950); Piano Sonata No. 6 "Drei Klavierstücke", E. 130 (1952) | | Analekta |
| 1990 | Sorabji: Piano Sonata No. 1: Kaikhosru Shapurji Sorabji: Piano Sonata No. 1 (1919) | | Altarus |
| 1989 | Ives: Piano Sonata No. 2 "Concord" • Wright: Sonata: Maurice Wright (b. 1949): Piano Sonata (1982); Charles Ives: Piano Sonata No. 2 "Concord Sonata" (1904–1915, 1947) | January 1987; July 1988 | New World Records |
| 1988 | Bolcom & Wolpe: William Bolcom: 12 New Etudes (1977–1986); winner of 1988 Pulitzer Prize in Music; Stefan Wolpe: Battle Piece (1942–1943, 1947) | January 1987 | New World Records |
| 1988 | Godowsky: Original Works and Transcriptions (Œuvres Originales et Transcriptions): Studies on Chopin's Études (1894–1914); No. 7 in G♭ major after Op. 10 No. 5 No. 8 in C major after Op. 10 No. 5 No. 19 in D major after Op. 10 No. 10 No. 31 in A minor after Op. 25 No. 4 No. 45 in E major after Nouvelle étude No. 2: Bonne nuit (Gute Nacht), No. 1 from Winterreise (1826) by Franz Schubert; Litanie (Am Tage Aller Seelen), D.343 (1831) by Franz Schubert; Musique de ballet de "Rosamunde", D.797 (1823) by Franz Schubert; Sérénade (Ständchen), Op. 17 No. 2 (1887) by Richard Strauss; Tango in D major, No. 2 from España, Op.165, by Isaac Albéniz; Gigue ('Renaissance' No. 12) by Jacques Lœillet; Passacaglia: 44 Variations, Cadenza and Fugue on the Opening of Schubert's "Unfinished Symphony" (1927); Prélude et fugue (B.A.C.H.) for the left hand alone (1929); Étude macabre (1929); Suite Java (1924–1925); No. 2 Wayang Purwa, Théâtre d'ombres javanaises No. 8 Les jardins de Buitenzorg | August 1987 | Musica Viva |

== Video recordings ==
| Year of issue | video details | Recording date(s) | Record label |
|---|---|---|---|
| 2006 | It's All about the Music: PART I The art of Marc-André Hamelin documentary; PART II Recital: Hamelin in Chalevoix, Quebec; Godowsky/Chopin: Seven studies; Godowsky: The Gardens of Buitenzorg, from Java Suite; Wagner/Liszt: Isoldens Liebestod, S447; Verdi/Liszt: Ernani - Paraphrase de Concert, S432; Sciarrino: Anamorfosi; Antheil: Piano Sonata No. 4, 'Jazz Sonata'; Debussy: Reflets dans l'eau, from Images II; PART III Extra features (interviews with Jay Reise, Harvey Wedeen and Robert Rimm; Concert performance of Busoni's Piano Concerto Op. 39, fourth movement, with the Lahti Symphony Orchestra under Osmo Vanska) | | Hyperion |
| 2007 | Marc-André Hamelin – No Limits: Concert performance; Haydn: Piano Sonata in E major, Hob. XVI:31; Chopin: Piano Sonata No. 3 in B minor, Op. 58; Debussy: Préludes, Book II; Hamelin: Étude No. 7, after Tchaikovsky; Gershwin: Do, Do, Do, Liza); Interview with Marc-André Hamelin | | Euroarts |
