= List of compositions by Percy Grainger =

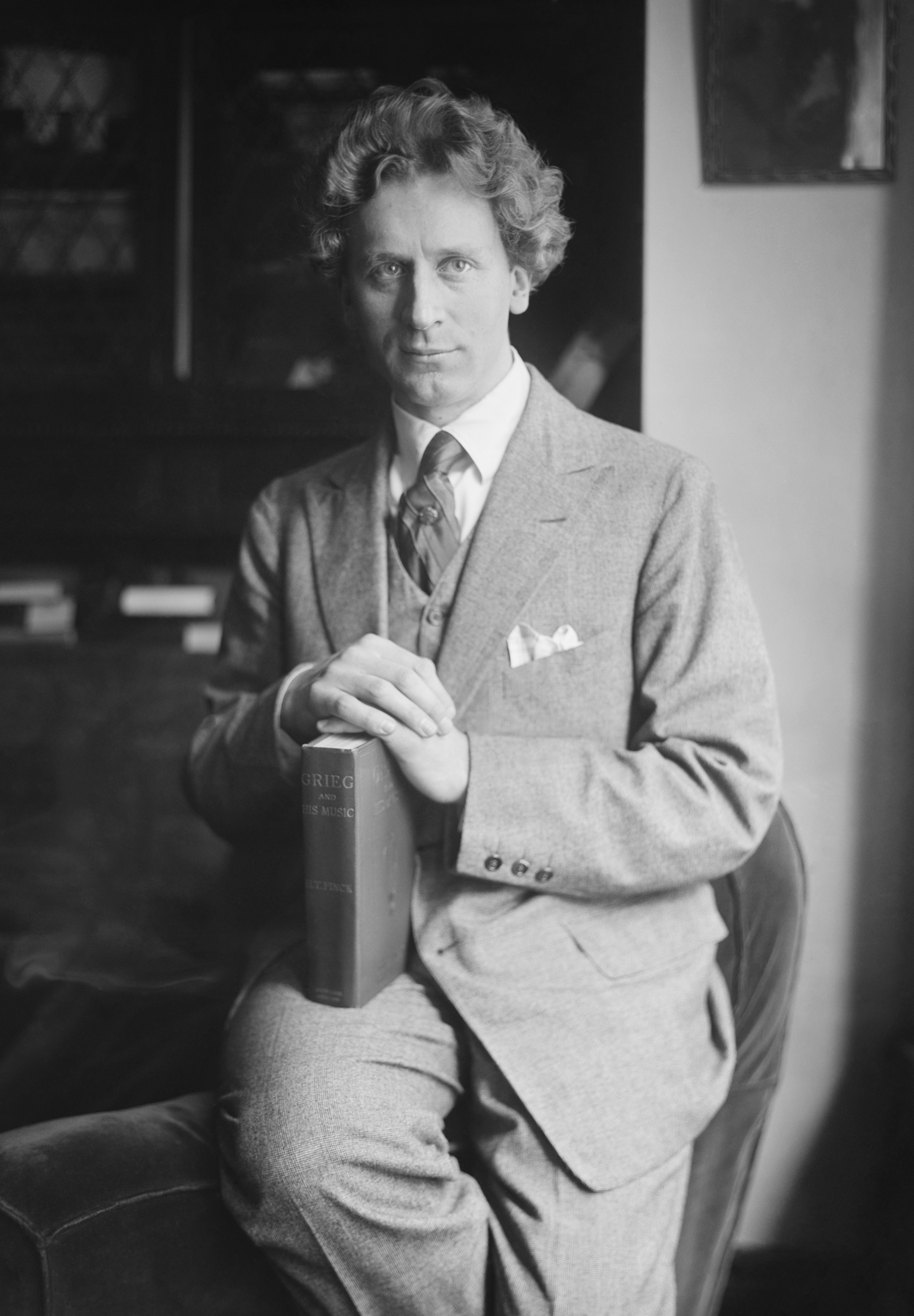
Grainger, c. 1910s

The published musical compositions of Percy Grainger (1882–1961) fall into two main categories: (a) original works and (b) folksong settings. There are also numerous unpublished works, sketches and juvenilia. Grainger's compositional career lasted for more than half a century, from the end of the 19th century until the middle 1950s. Works tended to be written concurrently, and were often developed over very long periods of time—in some cases extending to several decades—before eventual publication. Many of the compositions exist in a number of different versions, some of which refer to "elastic scoring", a means which permits performances by undefined musical forces ranging from small instrumental groups to full orchestra.

Publication dates refer to the first publications of individual works, although Grainger often continued to revise and prepare new versions of works long after their initial publication. The lists below do not represent a full record of Grainger's compositional work. Grainger's biographer John Bird has referred to the near-impossibility of cataloguing all of the composer's work, bearing in mind that "[h]is original compositions are scattered to the four corners of the earth". In the mid-1970s the Grainger Museum in Melbourne began the work of rationalising and cataloguing its large collection of Grainger manuscripts, and published its initial results in 1978. Grainger also made many arrangements of other composers' works, which are not listed here.

== Collections ==
Grainger assembled many of his works under generic collection headings:

- American Folk-music Settings (AFMS)
- British Folk-music Settings (BFMS)
- Danish Folk-music collection (DFMS)
- Kipling Jungle Book Cycle (KJBC)
- Kipling Settings (KS)
- Room-music Tit-bits (RMTB)
- Sea Chanty Settings (SCS)
- Sentimentals (S)
- Settings of Dance – Folksongs from the Faeroe Islands (SDFFI)
- Settings of Songs and Tunes from William Chappell's "Old English Popular Music". (OEPM)

== Original works ==
Title	Collection ref.	Musical forces	Date(s) composed	Year of publication	Comment	Refs.
"Anchor Song"	KS 6	Solo baritone, male choir or 4 voices, piano or orchestra	1899–21	1922	Verses by Rudyard Kipling	
"Arrival Platform Humlet"	RMTB 7	Viola, solo or ensemble	1908–12	1916	Other versions within the suite In a Nutshell	
"At Twilight"		Unaccompanied tenor and mixed chorus	1900–09	1913	Words by Grainger	
"Australian Up-country Song"		Unaccompanied mixed chorus	1905–28	1930		
"The Beaches of Lukannon"	KS 20 and KJBC 5	Mixed chorus, strings ensemble, harmonium ad lib	1898–41	1958	Verses by Rudyard Kipling	
"Blithe Bells"		2 flutes (2nd also piccolo), oboe, 2 clarinets, 2 bassoons (bassoon 1 ad lib.), horn (or alto saxophone), 2 trumpets (or soprano saxophones, trp.2 ad lib), trombone ad lib, harmonium ad lib., glockenspiel, vibraphone ad lib., marimba ad lib., celesta ad lib., piano 4-hands, harp ad lib., strings	1931	1932		
"The Bride's Tragedy"		Chorus and orchestra or piano	1908–13	1914	Verses by Algernon Swinburne	
"Children's March: Over the Hills and Far Away"	RMTB 4	(a) Solo piano (excerpt) (b) Military band, pianos (c) Two pianos, four hands	1916–18	1918; 1919; 1920		
Colonial Song	S 1	(a) Solo piano (b) Piano trio (c) Soprano, tenor, violin, cello, piano (d) Soprano, tenor, harp and orchestra (e) Military band	1905–21	1913; 1913; 1913; 1918; 1921		
"Danny Deever"		Male chorus and orchestra, or baritone, male chorus, orchestra or piano	1903–22	1924		
"Dedication"	KS 1	Tenor, piano	1901	1912	Verses by Rudyard Kipling	
"Eastern Intermezzo"	RMTB 5	(a) Solo piano (b) Two pianos, four hands	1899–1945	1922; 1922	Other version within Youthful Suite	
"English Dance"		(a) Two pianos, six hands (b) Chamber group (nine instruments) (c) Orchestra and organ	1899–21	1924; 1924; 1929		
"English Waltz"		Two pianos, four hands	1899–47	1947	Other version within Youthful Suite	
"The Fall of the Stone"	KS 16 and KJBC 1	Chorus, with brass, woodwind, strings, harmonium, piano ad lib	1901–23	1924	Verses by Rudyard Kipling	
"Handel in the Strand" (clog dance)	RMTB 2	(a) Piano trio and viola ad lib (b) Solo piano (c) String orchestra (d) Two pianos, four hands	1911–47	1912; 1930; 1932; 1947		
"Harvest Hymn"		(a) Chamber or full orchestra, voices ad lib (b) Violin and piano (c) Unaccompanied chorus (d) Solo piano (e) Piano, four hands with voices ad lib (f) Strings with piano, harmonium or organ (g) Violin, cello, with organ or piano	1905–38	1940; 1940; 1940; 1940; 1940; 1942 unknown		
Hassan: General Dance		Orchestra	1923	1923	Contribution to the revised version of Delius's incidental music to Hassan	
"Hill Song No. 1"		(a) Two pianos, four hands (b) Two piccolos, six oboes, six English horns, six bassoons, contrabassoon (c) flute, piccolo, six double reeds, trumpet, euphonium, saxophones, harmonium, piano, percussion, six strings	1901–23	1922 1922, 1924		
"Hill Song No. 2"		(a) Two pianos, four hands (b) Wind instruments and cymbals (c) Large wind ensemble	1907–46	1922; 1950; 1950		
"Hunting-song of the Seonee Pack"	KS 8 and KJBC 8	(a) Male voice choir (b) Male voice choir with optional wind and plucked strings	1899–1922	1922; 1958	Verses by Rudyard Kipling	
"The Immovable Do"		(a) Organ (b) Solo piano (c) Clarinet or woodwind choir (d) Chorus with various orch. or instrumental combinations (e) String or full orchestra	1933–42	1941; 1941; 1941; 1941; 1942		
In a Nutshell (suite): "Arrival Platform Humlet"; "Gay but Wistful"; "Pastoral"; "The Gumsuckers March"		(a) Solo piano (b) Two pianos, four hands (c) Orchestra, tuneful percussion, piano	1908–16	1916; 1916; 1916		
"The Inuit"	KS 5 and KJBC 4	Unaccompanied chorus	1902	1912	Verses by Rudyard Kipling	
"The Lads of Wamphray"		(a) Male chorus with small orch. or piano (b) Wind Band	1904–38	1925; 1941	Words by Sir Walter Scott	
"The Love Song of Har Dyal"	KS 11	Soprano, piano	1901	1923	Verses by Rudyard Kipling	
"Love Verses from The Song of Solomon"		Soloists, chorus, instrumental or piano accompaniment	1899–1931	1931		
"Lullaby" from Tribute to Foster		Solo piano	1915	1917		
"Marching Song of Democracy"		(a) Chorus; orchestra, organ (b) Brass band	1901–48	1917 uncertain		
"The Men of the Sea"	KS 10	Unspecified voice, piano	1899	1923	Verses by Rudyard Kipling	
"The Merry Wedding (Bridal Dance)"		Nine solo voices, chorus and orchestra or piano	1912–15	1916	Traditional Faeroese verses	
"Mock Morris"	RMTB 1	(a) Three violins, two cellos, viola (b) String orchestra (c) Solo pano (concert version) (d) Solo piano (popular version) (e) Violin and piano (f) Orchestra	1910–14	1911; 1911; 1912; 1912; 1914; 1937		
"Morning Song in the Jungle"	KS 3 and KJBC 2	Unaccompanied chorus	1905	1912	Verses by Rudyard Kipling	
"Mowgli's Song Against People"	KS 15 and KJBC 11	Chorus with oboe, harmonium, piano, violin, two violas, three cellos, double bass (instrumentation revised 1941–56)	1903–56	1924, 1958	Verses by Rudyard Kipling	
"Night Song in the Jungle"	KS 17 and KJBC 3	Unaccompanied male chorus	1899–1924	1925	Verses by Rudyard Kipling	
"The Only Son"	KS 21 and KJBC 10	Soprano and tenor, with harmonium, piano, two violins, viola, two cellos, double bass (wind, timpani and harp ad lib)	1945–47	1958	Verses by Rudyard Kipling	
"The Peora Hunt"	KS 14 and KJBC 7	Chorus with various optional accompaniments; harmonium, strings, woodwind, piano or harmonium	1901–06	1924		
"The Power of Rome and the Christian Heart"		(a) Brass band, organ, with percussion and strings optional (b) Orchestra, organ, with percussion and strings optional	1918–43	1953; 1953		
"Recessional"	KS 18	Chorus with optional accompaniment	1905–29	1930	Verses by Rudyard Kipling	
"Red Dog"	KS 19 and KJBC 6	Unaccompanied male chorus	1941	1958	Verses by Rudyard Kipling	
"A Reiver's Neck-verse"		Tenor, piano	1908	1911	Verses by Algernon Swinburne	
"The Running of Shindand"	KS 9	Unaccompanied male chorus	1901–04	1922	Verses by Rudyard Kipling	
"The Sea Wife"	KS 22	Chorus with brass ensemble or strings with piano	1898–1947	1948	Verses by Rudyard Kipling	
"Soldier, Soldier"	KS 13	Six solo voices and chorus	1899–1908	1925	Verses by Rudyard Kipling	
"A Song of Autumn"		Unspecified voice, piano	1899	1923	Verses by A.L. Gordon	
"The Two Ravens" ("The Twa Corbies")		Baritone solo, with piano, two violins, two violas, two cellos, double bass	1903–09	1924	Traditional Scots ballad	
"Tiger, Tiger"	KS 4 and KJBC 9	Male chorus, optional tenor solo	1905	1912	Verses by Rudyard Kipling	
"To a Nordic Princess"		(a) Solo piano (b) Orchestral	1927–28	1929		
"Tribute to Foster"		Soloists and chorus; musical glasses, pianos or orchestra, tuneful percussion	1913–31	1932	Verses by Grainger and Stephen Foster	
"Walking Tune"	RMTB 3	(a) Solo piano (b) Wind quintet	1900–05	1912		
The Warriors: Music to an Imaginary Ballet		(a) Two pianos, six hands (b) Orchestra, three pianos (tuneful percussion ad lib)	1913–16	1926; 1926		
"We Have Fed Our Seas"	KS 2	Chorus with brass ensemble, ad lib strings	1900–11	1911	Verses by Rudyard Kipling	
"The Widow's Party"	KS 7	(a) Male chorus with orchestra or pianos (b) Male chorus with brass band or pianos	1906–26	1923; 1929	Verses by Rudyard Kipling	
"Youthful Rapture"		(a) Cello and piano (b) Cello, violin, piano, harmonium and other instruments ad lib	1901–29	1930; 1930		
Youthful Suite: "Northern March"; "Rustic Dance"; "Norse Dirge"; "Eastern Intermezzo"; "English Waltz"		Orchestra, with percussion, celesta, harmonium and piano ad lib	1899–1945	1950		
"Zanzibar Boat Song"	RMTB 6	Piano, six hands	1902	1923		

== Folksong adaptations and arrangements ==
Title	Collection ref.	Musical forces	Date(s) composed	Year of publication	Comment	Ref.
"As Sally Sat A-weeping"		Two pianos, four hands	1905–12	1924	One of "Two Musical Relics of my Mother" (see also "Hermundur Illi")	
"Bold William Taylor"	BFMS 47	Unspecified voice; piano or instrumental accompaniment	1908	1952		
"Brigg Fair"	BFMS 7	Tenor and chorus	1906–11	1911		
"British Waterside"	BFMS 26	High or low voice and piano	1920	1921		
"The Camp"		Male chorus with small mixed chorus and brass band	1904	1904	One of "Two Welsh Fighting Songs" (see also "The March of the Men of Harlech")	
"Country Gardens"	BFMS 22	(a) Solo piano (b) Two pianos, four hands (c) One piano, four hands (d) Two pianos, eight hands (e) Solo piano (easy version) (f) Solo piano (especially easy version)	1908–36	1919; 1932; 1937; 1937; 1943; 1943		
Danish Folksongs Suite:"The Power of Love"; "Lord Peter's Stable-boy"; "The Nightingale and the Two Sisters"; "Jutish Medley"	DFMS 2, 1, 10 and 9	(a) Elastic scoring, from 2–4 instruments to orchestra (b) Orchestra, organ and piano	1926–41	1930–31, 1950	Other versions of individual numbers	
"David of the White Rock"		Unspecified voice, piano	1954	1963		
"Ramble on The Last Love Duet"	Unknown	Solo piano	1927	?	Transcribed from a theme based on Richard Strauss' Der Rosenkavalier	
"Died for Love"	BFMS 10	(a) Solo piano (b) Female voice, with piano or small instrumental groups	1906–07	1912		
"Dollar and a Half a Day"	SCS 2	Unaccompanied male soloists and choir	1908–09	1922–23		
"The Duke of Marlborough Fanfare"	BFMS 36	Brass band or brass choir, cymbal	1905–39	1949		
"Father and Daughter"	SDFFI 1	3 tenors, baritone, bass, chorus; brass, percussion and strings accompaniment, mandolin and guitar ad lib	1908–09	1913		
"Green Bushes"	BFMS 12 and 25	(a) Various instrumental combinations (b) Two pianos, six hands	1905–21	1921; 1931		
"Hermundur Illi" (Hurmund the Evil)		Two pianos, four hands	1905–12	1924	One of "Two Musical Relics of my Mother" (see also "As Sally Sat A'weeping")	
"The Hunter in his Career"	OEPM 3 and 4	(a) Men's chorus and orchestra (b) Men's chorus, two pianos (c) Piano solo	1904–30	1904; 1930; 1930		
"Husband and wife"	DMFS 5	Two voices; instrumental accompaniment with timpani ad lib	1923	1930	Other versions in "Jutish Medley" and Danish Folksongs Suite	
"I'm Seventeen Come Sunday"	BFMS 8	Chorus, brass accompaniment	1905–12	1906, 1913		
"Irish Tune from County Derry"	BFMS 6, 5, 15, 20 and 29	(a) Solo piano (b) Unaccompanied wordless chorus (c) Strings with horns ad lib (d) Band, organ, choruses ad lib (e) Orchestra (elastic scoring)	1902–20	1911; 1912; 1913; 1918; 1920		
Jutish Medley: "Choosing the Bride"; The Dragon's Farewell; Husband and Wife; The Shoemaker from Jerusalem; Lord Peter's Stable-boy	DFMS 8 and DFMS 9	(a) Solo piano (b) Two pianos, six hands (elastic)	1923–29	1928; 1930	Other versions within Danish Folksongs Suite and for individual numbers	
"Knight and Shepherds Daughter"	BFMS 18	Solo piano	1918	1919		
"Lets Dance Gay in Green Meadow"	SDFFI	(a) Piano, four hands (b) Wind Ensemble, 1954	1905–54	1967; 1969	Also known as "Faeroe Island Dance"	
Lincolnshire Posy: "Lisbon" (also called "Dublin Bay"); "Horkstow Grange"; "Rufford Park Poachers"; "The Brisk Young Sailor"; "Lord Melbourne"; "The Lost Lady Found"	BFMS 34 and 35	(a) Two pianos, four hands (b) Wind ensemble	1905–37	1940; 1940	Other versions for individual numbers	
"Lisbon (Dublin Bay)"	BFMS 40	Wind quintet or saxophone choir	1931	1972	Other versions in Lincolnshire Posy	
"Lord Peter's Stable-boy"	DFMS 1	(a) Elastic scoring up to full orchestra (b) Wind band (c) Voices with instruments ad lib	1922–27	1930; 1930; 1930	Other versions in Danish Folksongs Suite and Jutish Medley	
"The Lost Lady Found"	BFMS 33	Chorus, with brass, timpani and strings or piano and strings	1905–10	1949	Other version in Lincolnshire Posy	
"The March of the Men of Harlech"		Male chorus with small mixed chorus and brass band	1904	1904	One of "Two Welsh Fighting Songs" (see also "The Camp")	
"Marching Tune"	BFMS 9	Chorus with brass ensemble or piano	1905–06	1911		
"The Merry King"	BFMS 38 and 39	(a) Solo Piano (b) Wind and/or strings, piano, organ	1905–39	1939; 1939		
"Molly on the Shore"	BFMS 1, 19, and 23	(a) String quartet or string orchestra (b) Orchestra (c) Solo piano (d) Military band (e) Two pianos, four hands	1907–47	1911; 1914; 1918; 1921; 1948		
"My Robin is to the greenwood gone"	OEPM	(a) Solo piano (b) Violin, cello and piano (c) Strings, flute, English horn	1912	1912; 1912; 1912		
"The Nightingale and the Two Sisters"	DFMS 10	Wind band	1923–30	1931	Other versions in Danish Folksong Suite	
"Old Irish Tune"		Unaccompanied chorus	1902	1904		
"One More Day, my John"	SCS 1	Solo piano	1915	1921		
"The Pretty Maid Milkin' her Cow"	BFMS 27	Unspecified voice, piano (high and low key versions)	1920	1921		
La Scandinavie (Scandinavian Suite): "Swedish Air and Dance"; "Song of Vermland"; "Norwegian Polka"; "Danish Melody"; "Air and Finale on Swedish Dances"		Cello, piano	1902	1903		
"Scotch Strathspey and Reel"	BFMS 28, 37	(a) Two tenors, two baritones; 20 or 21 instruments ad lib (b) Solo piano	1901–39	1924; 1939		
"Shallow Brown"	SCS 3	Solo voice(s) and chorus with various combinations of instrumental accompaniment	1910–25	1927		
"Shepherd's Hey"	BFMS 3, 4, 16, 21	(a) 12 instruments (strings, wind) (b) Orchestra (c) Solo piano (d) Simplified piano solo (e) Wind band (f) Two pianos, four hands	1908–47	1911; 1913; 1914; 1918; 1948; 1967		
"Sir Eglamore"	BFMS 13	Double chorus; brass, percussion, strings accompanimentharp,	1904–12	1904, 1912		
"Six Dukes Went Afishin'"	BFMS 11	Unspecified voice (high and low versions), piano	1905–12	1913		
"A Song of Vermland"		Unaccompanied chorus	1903–04	1904	Other version in La Scandinavie	
"Spoon River"	AFMS 1, 3	(a) Solo piano (b) Elastic scoring (c) Two pianos, four hands	1919–33	1922; 1930; 1932		
"The Sprig of Thyme"	BFMS 24	Unspecified voice (high and low versions), piano	1907–20	1920		
"The Sussex Mummers' Christmas Carol"	BFMS 2, 17	(a) Violin or cello and piano (b) Solo piano	1905–15	1916; 1916		
"There Was a Pig Went Out to Dig"	BFMS 18	(a) Two sopranos, two altos unaccompanied (b) Female or children's choir	1905–10	1915		
"The Three Ravens"	BFMS 41	Baritone and chorus; woodwind accompaniment	1902	1905		
"Willow Willow"	OEPM 1	(a) Voice and piano (b) Voice with guitar or harp and strings	1898–1911	1912; 1912		
"Ye Banks and Braes o' Bonnie Doon"	BFMS 31	(a) Male chorus with whistlers or women's unison voices (b) Orchestra (c) Wind band	1901–32	1937 1937 1949		

== Hitherto unpublished works now published (original composition and arrangements) ==
Title	Collection ref.	Musical forces	Date(s) composed	Publisher	Comment	Ref.
"Beautiful Fresh Flower"		Solo piano	1935	Bardic Edition		
"Colleen Dhas"		Flute, English horn, guitar, violin, viola, cello	1904	Bardic Edition	Folksong setting	
"Creepin' Jane"	BFMS	Unspecified voice, piano	1920–21	Bardic Edition	Folksong setting	
"Early One Morning"	BFMS	(a) Flute, horn, strings, contrabassoon, all ad lib (b) Soprano with wind and strings accompaniment	1901–40	Bardic Edition	Folksong setting	
"Echo-song Trials"		Woodwind, brass, strings, harpsichord or piano	1945	Grainger Society		
Free music		(a) String quartet (b) Theremins	1907–36	Bardic Edition		
"Gipsy's Wedding Day"	BFMS	Four voices	1906	Bardic Edition		
"Hard-Hearted Barbara [H]ellen"	BFMS	Voice and piano	1906–46	Bardic Edition		
"In Bristol Town"	BFMS	(a) Voice and "room music" (b) Viola and organ Solo piano or piano, six hands	1906–51	Bardic Edition		
"In Dahomey (Cakewalk Smasher)"		Solo piano	1903–09	Peters Edition		
"The Lonely Desert-man Sees the Tents of the Happy Tribes"	RMTB 9	(a) Piano, four hands (b) Trumpet and woodwind (various combinations) (c) Soprano, tenor, baritone with piano and various instrumental combinations	1911–54	Bardic Edition		
"Lord Maxwell's Goodnight"	BFMS 14 and BFMS 42	Baritone or tenor, strings accompaniment	1904–47	Bardic Edition	Folksong setting	
"The Maiden and the Frog"	DFMS	Cello and piano		Bardic Edition		
"Mary Thomson"		Chorus	1913	Bardic Edition		
"Mock Morris" (Always Merry and Bright)	RMTB 1	Two pianos, four hands	1910	Bardic Edition		
"My Love's in Germany"	BFMS	Mixed voices	1903	Bardic Edition		
"Near Woodstock Town	BFMS	(a) mixed voices Solo piano	1903–51	Bardic Edition		
"The Old Woman at the Christening"	DFMS 11	Unspecified voice with harmonium and piano	1925	Bardic Edition		
"O Mistress Mine"	BFMS	Mixed chorus	1903	Bardic Edition		
"The Power of Love"	DFMS 2, 4	Solo soprano, with piano or various instrumental combinations	1922–41	Bardic Edition	Other versions in Danish Folksong Suite	
"Pritteling, Pratteling, Pretty Poll Parrot"		Two pianos, four hands	1911	Bardic Edition		
"Random Round"		(a) Two pianos, 12 hands, maracas (b) Three soloists, with viola, xylophone, guitar, ukulele, maracas and other combinations	1912–43	Bardic Edition		
"Rimmer and Goldcastle"	DFMS 3	Chous and piano solo	undated	Bardic Edition		
"The Rival Brothers"		Four soloists with violin, viola, cello	1905–43	Bardic Edition	Faeroese ballad	
"Sailor's Song"		(a) Orchestra; Bells and tuneful percussion Solo piano	1900–54	Peters Edition (simplified piano) solo Bardic Edition		
"Shenandoah"	SCS	Male voices	1907	Bardic Edition		
Songs of the North: 14 songs including "Skye Boat Song"; "Leeze Lindsay"; "Weaving Song" and 11 others		Voices and piano	1900–54	Bardic Edition		
"Spoon River"		Wind ensemble	1933		Folksong setting	
"Stalt Vesselil" (Proud Vesselil)	DFMS	(a) Voice; Solo piano	1951	Bardic Edition		
"Stormy (Pumping Chanty)"		Male voices	1907	Peters Edition		
"Thanksgiving Song"		Five voices and up to 30 instruments	1945	Bardic Edition		
"Thou Gracious Power"		Chorus	1952	Bardic Edition		
"Train Music"		Orchestra, with simplified piano version	1901–57	Bardic Edition		
"Under a Bridge"	DFMS 12	Soprano, baritone soloists with flute, trumpet, piano four hands, tuneful percussion	1928–46	Bardic Edition	Folksong setting	
"When the World was Young"	S	Two pianos, four hands	1910–11	Bardic Edition		
"The Wraith of Odin"		Two pianos, four hands	1903–22	Bardic Edition		

== Unpublished incomplete sketches and juvenilia (some now published) ==
Title	Collection ref.	Musical forces	Date(s) composed	Publisher	Comment
"Afterword"		Mixed chorus and brass	1910	Bardic Edition	
"Afton Water"		Voice and piano	1898	Bardic Edition	
"Agincourt song"	BFMS	Mixed chorus	undated	Bardic Edition	
"Ballad of Clampherdown"	KS	Baritone and piano	1899		Kipling setting
"Ballad of the 'Bolivar'"	KS	Male chorus and orchestra	1901		Kipling setting
"Birthday Gift to Mother"		Not stated	1893		
"The Bridegroom Grat"	BFMS	voice and strings (or piano)	1902	Bardic Edition	
Bush Music		Not stated	1900–22		
"Death Song for Hjalmar Thuren"		Not stated	1916–17		
"Evan Banks"		Voice and piano	1898	Bardic Edition	
"The First Chantey"	KS	(a) Voice and piano (b) Baritone, chorus and instruments	1899–1903	Bardic Edition	Kipling setting
"Fisher's Boarding House"	KS	Orchestra	1899	Bardic Edition	
"Ganges Pilot"	KS	Baritone and piano	1899	Bardic Edition	Kipling setting
"The Hunt is Up"	BFMS	male voices and piano duet	1901	Bardic Edition	
"The Keel Row"	BFMS	mixed chorus and orchestra (realised Ould)	1901	Bardic Edition	
"Land o' the Leal"		voice and strings (or piano)	1901		
"The Merchantmen"	KS	Voices and instruments	1902–09		Kipling setting
"Merciful Town"	KS	voice and piano	1899	Bardic Edition	Kipling setting
"Nornagesti Rima"		Chorus	undated		Sketch based on Faeroe Island ballad
"Northern Ballad"	KS	Voice and piano	1898–99	Bardic Edition	
"Norwegian Idyll"		Not stated	1910		
"Old Little English Dance"		Orchestra	1899		
"Peace" and "Saxon Twi-play"		Piano	1898	Bardic Edition	
"Piano Concerto"		Two pianos	1896	Bardic Edition	
"The Rhyme of the Three Sealers"	KS	Four-part men and boys' chorus	1900–01		Kipling setting
"Ride with an Idle Whip"	KS	Voice and piano	1899	Bardic Edition	Kipling setting
Rondo for piano		Piano, four hands	1897	Bardic Edition	
"Saga of King Olaf" (with "Thora Von Rimol")		Voices and piano	1898–99		
"Sailor's Chanty"		Men's chorus or solo tenor, piano	1901	Bardic Edition	
"Sea song"		Strings	1907–46	Bardic Edition	Sketches for "beatless music"
"The Secret of the Sea"		Voice and piano	undated	Bardic Edition	
Theme and variations		String quartet	1898	Bardic Edition	
"There Were Three Friends"	KS	Orchestra	1898–99	Bardic Edition	
"To Walcott Balestier"	KS	Voices (possibly contralto), organ	undated		
"We be three poor mariners"	BFMS	Not stated	1901		
"We Were Dreamers"	KS	(a) Four-part chorus (b) Orchestra	1899	Bardic Edition Kipling setting	
"Who Built De Ark?"		Voices and guitar	1911		
"You Wild and Mossy Mountains		Voice and piano	1898	Bardic Edition	
"Young British Soldier"	KS	Voice and piano	1899	Bardic Edition	Kipling setting
