= Colonial Song =

1911 composition by Percy Grainger

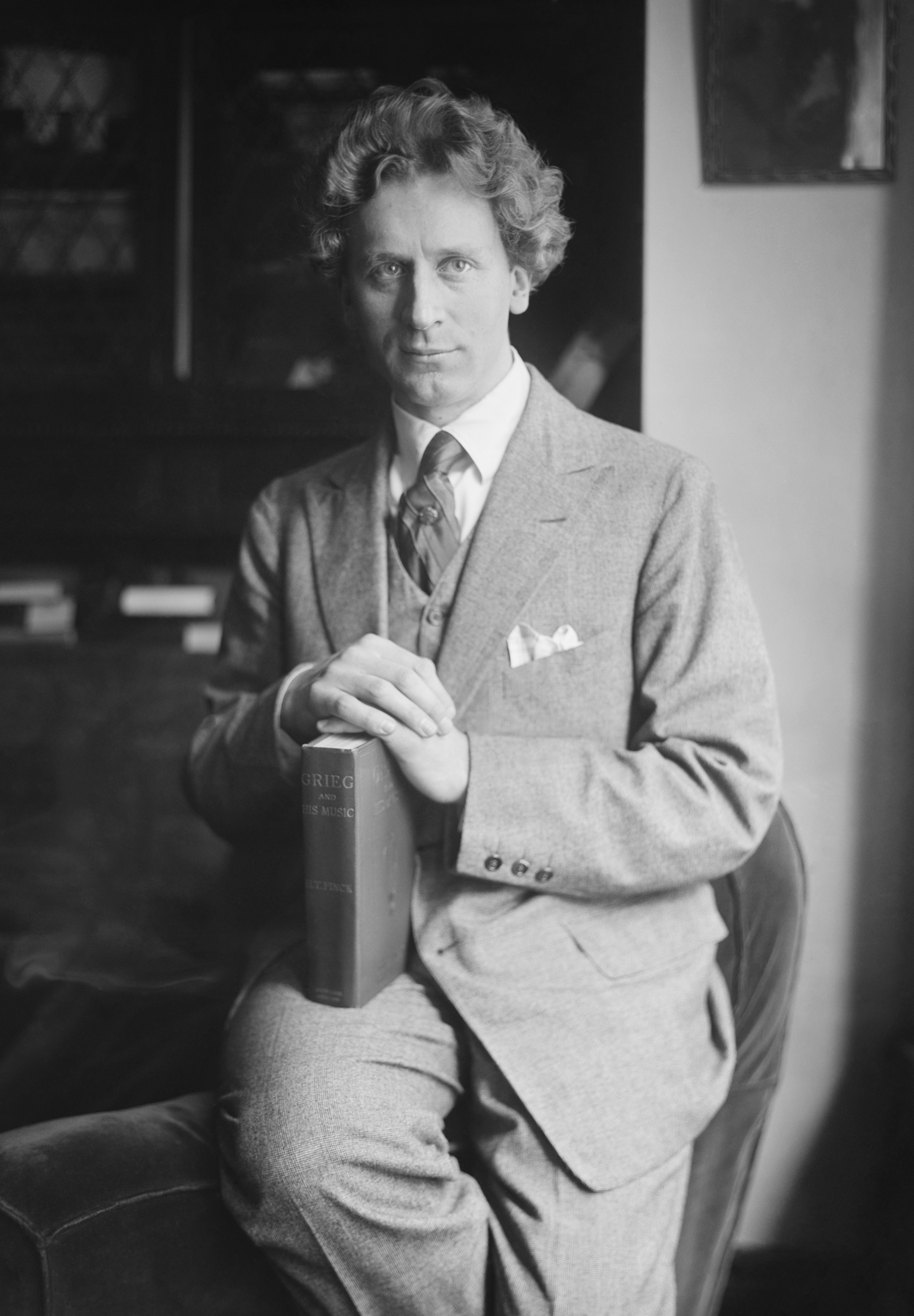
Grainger, c. 1910s

Colonial Song is a musical composition written by Australian composer Percy Grainger. Although Grainger created versions for different types of musical ensembles, its most commonly used version today is for concert band.

== Background ==
Grainger initially wrote Colonial Song in 1911 as a piano piece as a gift to his mother, Rose. Of his piece, Grainger wrote that it was "an attempt to write a melody as typical of the Australian countryside as Stephen Foster's exquisite songs are typical of rural America". Although the piece seems to have been intended as part of a series of 'Sentimentals', Grainger never wrote any other pieces in this series. Unlike many of Grainger's other compositions, the melodies of Colonial Song are not based on folk song, but are original melodies.

== Versions ==
Although originally written as a piano solo, Grainger arranged Colonial Song in several other versions. Among the versions published during Grainger's life include:

- Solo piano
- Symphony orchestra
- 2 voices (soprano and tenor), harp, and symphony orchestra
- 2 voices (soprano and tenor) and piano
- Violin, cello, piano
- Military band scored for:
  - Woodwinds: 2 D♭ Piccolos, 2 C Flutes, 2 Oboes; E♭ Clarinet; Solo B♭ Clarinet; 1st, 2nd and 3rd B♭ Clarinets; Alto Clarinet; Bass Clarinet; 2 Bassoons; Soprano Saxophone; Alto Saxophone; Tenor Saxophone; Baritone Saxophone
  - Brass: Solo B♭ Cornet, 1st, 2nd and 3rd B♭ Cornet (2nd and 3rd Flugelhorn ad lib.); 1st, 2nd, 3rd and 4th E♭ Horns; 1st, 2nd and 3rd Trombones; Baritone; Basses (Tubas, String Bass and Contra Sarrusophone ad lib.)
  - Percussion: Snare Drum; Cymbals; Gong; Timpani in B♭ and E♭; Glockenspiel
  - Harp and Piano (multiple players ad lib.)

== Early reception ==
Early reception of Colonial Song was not positive. Fellow composer H. Balfour Gardiner disliked the piece, as did critics. Upon hearing the piece in 1914, Sir Thomas Beecham wrote: "My dear Grainger, you have achieved the almost impossible! You have written the worst piece of modern times". However, Colonial Song was received more positively in America. During his service in the United States Army, Grainger re-worked the piece for military band.

== Later reception ==
By the end of the twentieth century, Colonial Song had gained acceptance among wind band conductors. Frank Battisti, conductor emeritus of the New England Conservatory wind ensemble, included it in a list of 73 "meritorious" compositions. Noted conductor Frederick Fennell identified it as "basic band repertoire" in The Instrumentalist. By the late twentieth century, Colonial Song had been recorded by several college and university wind ensembles.
