= In a Nutshell =

1916 musical suite by Percy Grainger

- Suite by Percy Grainger
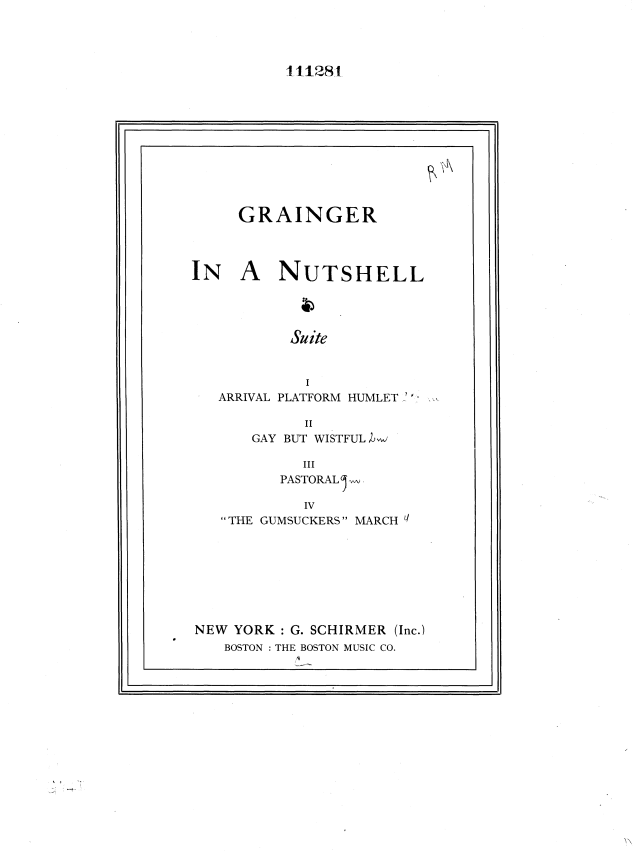
- The title page of the suite
- Movements: 4
- Scoring: Orchestra; piano; Deagan percussion instruments

Premiere
- Date: 8 June 1916
- Location: Norfolk Festival
- Conductor: Arthur Mees

In a Nutshell is a musical composition by Percy Aldridge Grainger for orchestra, piano, and Deagan percussion instruments. The suite, published in 1916, is made up of four movements: "Arrival Platform Humlet", "Gay But Wistful", "Pastoral", and "The Gum-Suckers March". Grainger later made versions for both solo piano and piano duo. It is described as one of the early modernist works of Grainger.

It premiered on 8 June 1916 at the summer Norfolk Festival, with Grainger on piano, under conductor Arthur Mees. Other early performances were made by the San Francisco Symphony, New York Philharmonic, Philadelphia Orchestra, and the Minneapolis Symphony Orchestra in the following winter.

== Composition ==
The first movement, "Arrival Platform Humlet", was originally written in 1908 for solo viola as one of Grainger's earliest works. In his words, the humlet (which he defined as a "little ditty to hum") came from: "awaiting the arrival of a belated train bringing one’s sweetheart from foreign parts [...] The sort of thing one hums to oneself as an accompaniment to one's tramping feet as one happily, excitedly, paces up and down the arrival platform." Anthony Bateman of The Guardian ranked it as one of the top ten best pieces inspired by trains.

The second movement, "Gay But Wistful", is subtitled as "a tune in a popular London style" referring to music hall, a popular genre of entertainment in Victorian England. In the staff description for its AllMusic entry, Dave Lewis notes that the piece, while clearly English in style, had a "jazz-inflected harmonic practice" similar to the future approach of jazz composer Duke Ellington.

Unlike the other three movements, Grainger did not provide program notes for "Pastoral", which is the longest movement of the work lasting approximately 10 minutes. It is noted as the standout piece in the work, being an early representative of his interest in atonal and free music, in which he shied away from traditional melody, harmony, and form. Musicologist Paul Fleet cites the movement as an early example of metatonality as a piece which "sits between the boundaries of tonality and atonality".

The fourth and last movement is "The Gum-Suckers March" (originally titled "Cornstalks' March" in early versions of the score). According to the composer, the title makes reference to Australians from the state of Victoria, where Grainger was from; residents would often suck the leaves of gum trees to stay cool in the summer. This movement was later arranged for band by the composer in 1942 and has become standard repertoire for the medium.

=== Percussion ===
For this composition, Grainger employed a large number of keyboard percussion instruments made by J. C. Deagan. Grainger thought highly of Deagan, describing their instruments as "marvelously perfected examples of American inventive ingenuity" in the program notes of the piece. Alongside the xylophone and glockenspiel (which by then had cemented their place in the orchestra), Grainger added four novel instruments: a wooden marimba, (Note: The wooden marimba, while now common in modern orchestral music, was a rarity in the early twentieth century. The instrument used for early performances would have actually been a xylo-marimba. It is cited as one of the earliest uses of the marimba in classical music.) a steel marimba, (Note: The steel marimba was similar to the modern vibraphone, having approximately the same range, but with bars made of steel rather than aluminum and no motor to produce a vibrato effect. The resonaphone made by Hawkes & Son is offered as an alternative in the score.) a nabimba, (Note: A nabimba was a sort of marimba with vibrating membranes placed in the resonators to give it a buzzing effect.) and Swiss staff bells. (Note: Swiss staff bells were similar to mounted hand bells. Grainger was one of the only composers to ever call for them, using them again in his piece The Warriors.)

== Reception ==
At the American premiere, many critics commended the suite. Several reviewers, such as The New York Times and a correspondent for The Daily Telegraph, praised the unique effects provided by the novel percussion instruments. Other American reviews, after a following December concert in California, had both the San Francisco Examiner and Oakland Tribune similarly complimenting the piece, highlighting the unique third movement, and likening it to a showcase of nature.

However, at the later British and Australian premieres, reactions to the piece were more mixed. Ferruccio Bonavia, writing for the The Guardian, criticized the piece as a bad attempt to be funny, while the Melbourne-based paper, The Age, criticized the "free harmonic habits" of "Pastoral" calling it "noisy", "wholly American", and far from "the healthy gumsucker". The Daily Telegraph was one paper critical towards the new percussion instruments, determining that the marimbas and like were inferior to the more common xylophone and bells, later defending that viewpoint after a response article in the Musical Courier that commended Grainger's experimentation.

== Instrumentation ==
The original version is scored for the following large orchestra:

Woodwinds

Piccolo
2 Flutes
2 Oboes
Cor Anglais
2 Clarinets in A (1st, 2nd, and 4th movements) and B♭ (3rd movement)
Bass clarinet in B♭ (1st, 2nd, and 3rd movements) and A (4th movement)
2 Bassoons
Double Bassoon

Brass

4 Horns in F (1st, 2nd, and 3rd movements) and E (4th movement)
3 Trumpets in B♭ (1st, 2nd, and 3rd movements) and A (4th movement)
3 Trombones
Tuba

Percussion

Timpani
Glockenspiel
Deagan Steel Marimba or Hawkes' Resonaphone
Deagan Staff Bells
Xylophone
Deagan Wooden Marimba
Deagan Nabimba
Side drum
Bass drum
Cymbals
Tam-tam

Keyboards

Piano
Celesta

Strings

Harp
Violin 1
Violin 2
Viola
Cello
Bass
