= Molly on the Shore =

Composition by Percy Grainger

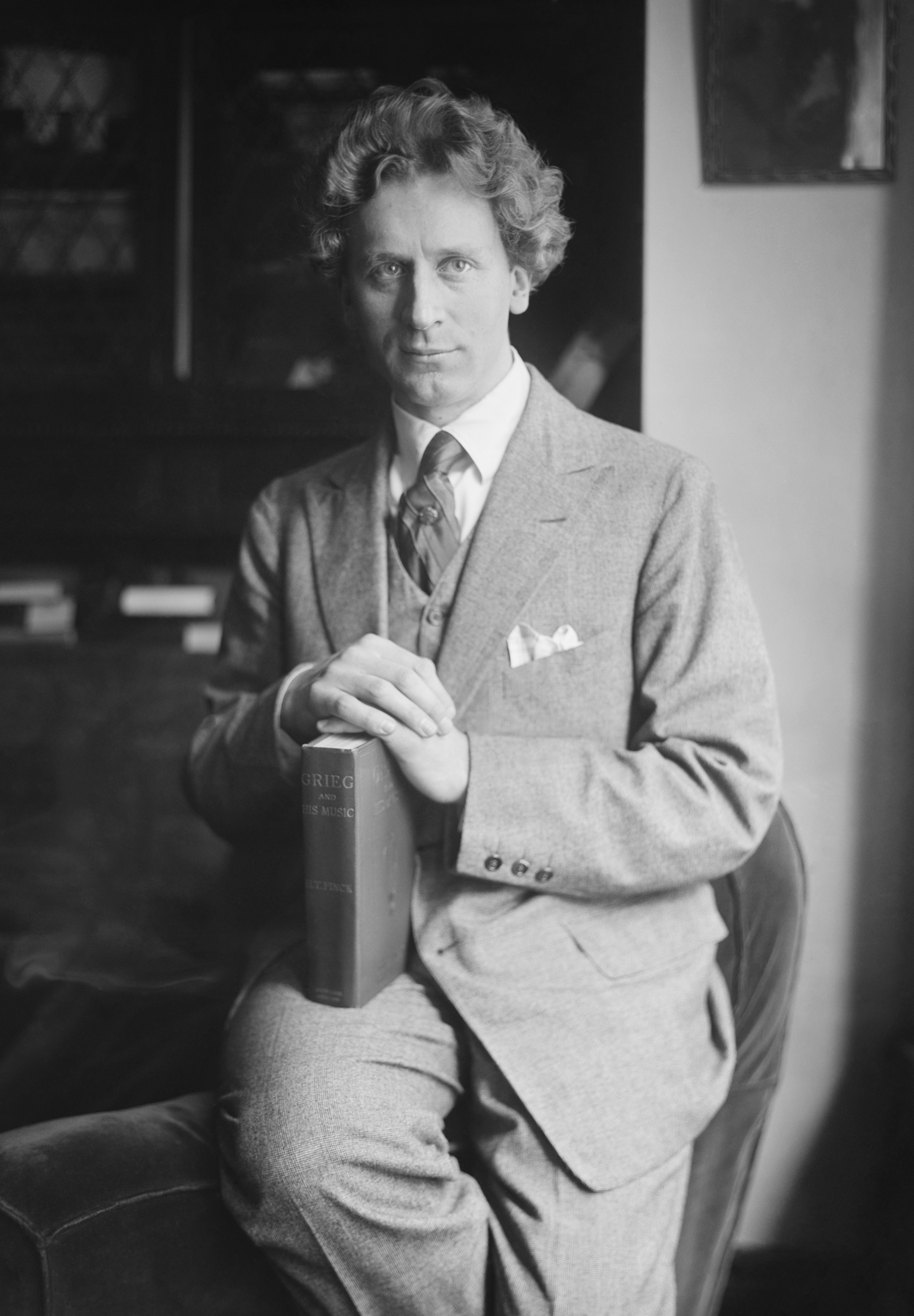
Percy Grainger, c. 1910s

Molly on the Shore is a composition by Percy Aldridge Grainger. It is an arrangement of two contrasting Irish reels, "Temple Hill" and "Molly on the Shore", that presents the melodies in a variety of textures and orchestrations, giving each section of the band long stretches of thematic and counter melodic material. The two reel tunes used by Grainger can be found in the Complete Petrie Collection of Ancient Irish Music as numbers 901 and 902. It was written in 1907 by Grainger as a birthday gift for his mother, Rose Annie Aldridge.

Originally composed for string quartet or string orchestra, this piece was arranged in 1914 for orchestra, for solo piano in 1918, and for wind band in 1920 (all by the composer). The string quartet version and the orchestral version are published as the first entry in Grainger's British Folk Music Settings collection, while the solo piano and wind band versions are nineteenth and the twenty-third British Folk Music Settings (respectively). Any parts of the several versions of BFMS 1 can be played with one another since they are all in the same key, but they cannot be combined with BFMS 23 since it is in concert A♭ major and not concert G major.

Fritz Kreisler set it for violin and piano, but Grainger was thoroughly unimpressed, saying that "[it] was a thousand times worse than I had fore-weened [i.e. expected], and I had not fore-weened anything good." In a letter to Frederick Fennell (who would later go on to create the definitive full score edition of Grainger's Lincolnshire Posy), Grainger says that

in setting Molly on the Shore, I strove to imbue the accompanying parts that made up the harmonic texture with a melodic character not too unlike that of the underlying reel tune. Melody seems to me to provide music with initiative, wheras [sic] rhythm appears to me to exert an enslaving influence. For that reason I have tried to avoid regular rhythmic domination in my music - always excepting irregular rhythms, such as those of Gregorian Chant, which seem to me to make for freedom. Equally with melody, I prize discordant harmony, because of the emotional and compassionate sway it exerts.

The wind band edition of "Molly on the Shore" mostly features the woodwind section of the band, especially the clarinets and saxophones. The opening clarinet solo is a common audition excerpt for that instrument.
