= Mock Morris =

1910 musical work by Australian composer Percy Grainger

Mock Morris is a musical work by Percy Grainger. Grainger wrote versions for string orchestra and solo piano. Composed in 1910, the work was first played at a concert in the Queen's Hall in 1912.
