= List of compositions by Charles-Valentin Alkan =

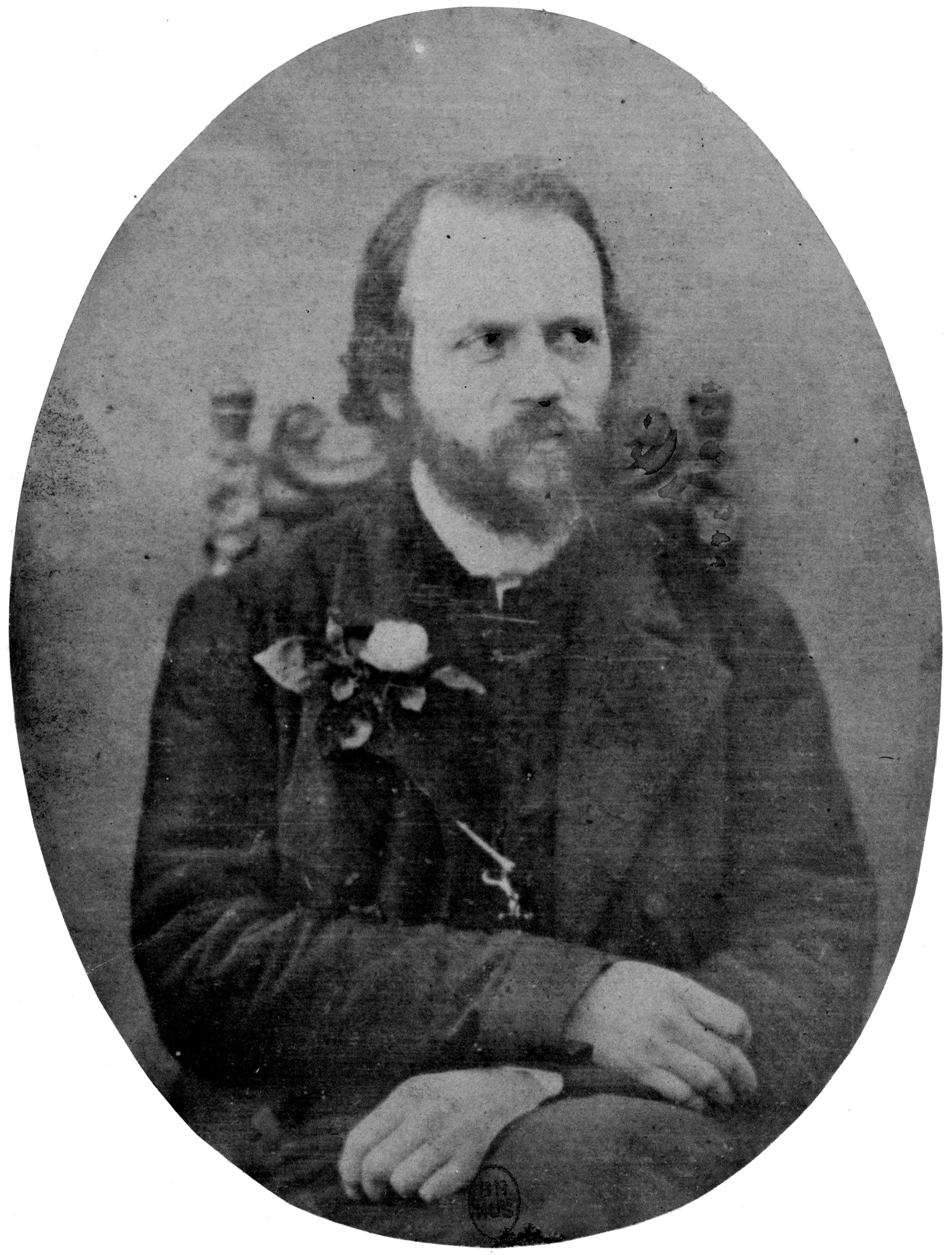
Charles-Valentin Alkan

The following is a list of all the musical compositions of Charles-Valentin Alkan in order of opus number. Transcriptions are excluded from this list. All dates are publication dates except for unpublished works:

== With opus numbers ==
- Op. 1, Variations on a theme from Steibelt's Orage concerto in E major (1828)
- Op. 2, Les omnibus, variations in C major (1829)
- Op. 3, Rondoletto Il était un p'tit homme in A major (1833)
- Op. 4, Rondo brillant in A major (1833)
- Op. 5, Largo al factotum, air du Barbier de Séville arrangé en rondo brillant (1833, lost)
- Op. 8 See 12 morceaux caractéristiques in 'Without opus numbers' below.
- Op. 10, Two Concerti da camera (1832–1837?)
  No. 1 Concerto da Camera in A minor (1832)
  Allegro moderato in A minor; Adagio in E major; Rondo: Allegro in A major
  No. 2 Concerto da Camera in C♯ minor (1834)
  Allegro moderato in C♯ minor; Adagio in A major; 1re movimento in C♯ major
  No. 3 Concerto da Camera in C♯ major (1837) (orchestral version of Op. 13 No. 2. Orchestral parts lost, reconstructed by Hugh Macdonald)
- Op. 12, Rondeau Chromatique in B minor (1834)
- Opp. 12, 13, 15 and 16 (nos. 1-3) below were published as 12 caprices en 4 livres (4 Livres d'Études-Caprices) (1837):
- Op. 12 (duplicated opus number), Trois improvisations dans le style brilliant (1837)
  No. 1 Prestissimo in E♭ major; No. 2 Allegretto in D♭ major; No. 3 Allegro marziale in B minor
- Op. 13, Trois andantes romantiques (1837)
  No. 1 Andante in B♭ major; No. 2 Andante con moto in C♯ major (= solo piano version of Op. 10 No. 3); No. 3 Andante in G♭ major
- Op. 15, Souvenirs. Trois morceaux dans le genre pathétique (1837)
  No. 1 Aime-moi in A♭ minor; No. 2 Le vent in B minor; No. 3 Morte in E♭ minor
- Op. 16 nos. 1–3, Trois études de bravoure, Tre scherzi ou Caprices (1837)
  No. 1 Mouvement de valse in C major; No. 2 Moderato (quasi Minuetto) in C minor; No. 3 Prestissimo in B minor
- Op. 16 no. 4 Variations sur "Ah! segnata é la mia morte" in D major (1834)
- Op. 16 no. 5 Variations sur un thème de Bellini "La tremenda ultrice spada" in G major (1834)
- Op. 16 no. 6 Variations quasi-fantaisie sur une barcarolle napolitiane in B♭ major (1834)
- Op. 16 (duplicate opus number) - See 12 morceaux caractéristiques in 'Without opus numbers' below.
- Op. 17, Le preux, étude de concert in B♭ major (1844), See also below 'Works without opus numbers - Piano 4 hands', Finale (duplicate opus number)
- Op. 21, Grand duo concertant in F♯ minor for violin and pianoforte (1842)
  Assez anime in F♯ minor; L'enfer (Lentement) ("Hell") in C♯ major; Aussi vite que possible in F♯ major
- Op. 22, Premier Nocturne in B major (1844)
- Op. 23, Saltarelle in E minor (1844)
- Op. 24, Gigue et air de ballet dans le style ancien (1844)
  Presto in A minor
  Modéré in D minor
- Op. 25, Alleluia in F major (1844)
- Op. 26, Marche funèbre in E♭ minor (1846). See also below 'Works without opus numbers - Piano 4 hands', Fantaisie à 4 mains sur Don Juan (duplicate opus number)
- Op. 27, Marche triomphale in B major (1846)
- Op. 27, Le chemin de fer in D minor (1844) (duplicate opus number)
- Op. 29, Bourrée d'Auvergne in C minor (1846)
- Op. 30, Premier Trio pour Piano, Violon, et Basse in G minor (1841)
  Assez largement in G minor; Très vite in G minor; Lentement in G major; Vite in G minor
- Op. 31, 25 Préludes dans tous les tons majeurs et mineurs pour le piano ou orgue (1847)

No. 1 Lentement in C major
No. 2 Assez lentement in F minor
No. 3 Dans le genre ancien in D♭ major
No. 4 Prière du soir in F♯ minor
No. 5 Psaume 150me in D major
No. 6 Ancienne mélodie de la synagogue in G minor
No. 7 Librement mais sans secousses in E♭ major
No. 8 La chanson de la folle au bord de la mer in A♭ minor
No. 9 Placiditas in E major
No. 10 Dans le style fugué in A minor
No. 11 Un petit rien in F major
No. 12 Le temps qui n'est plus in B♭ minor
No. 13 J'étais endormie, mais mon cœur veillait in G♭ major
No. 14 Rapidement in B minor
No. 15 Dans le genre gothique in G major
No. 16 Assez lentement in C minor
No. 17 Rêve d'amour in A♭ major
No. 18 Sans trop de mouvement in C♯ minor
No. 19 Prière du matin in A major
No. 20 Modérément vite et bien caractérisé in D minor
No. 21 Doucement in B♭ major
No. 22 Anniversaire in E♭ minor
No. 23 Assez vite in B major
No. 24 Étude de vélocité in E minor
No. 25 Prière in C major

- Op. 32 no. 1, 1er recueil d'impromptus (1845–1848, published 1848).
  No. 1 Vaghezza in B major (1847); No. 2 L'amitié in B major (1845); No. 3 Fantasietta alla moresca in G major (1847); No. 4 La foi in B♭ major (1848?).
- Op. 32 no. 2, 3 Airs à cinq temps et 1 air à sept temps, 2e. Recueil d'Impromptus (1849)
  No. 1 Andantino in A minor; No. 2 Mesto, allegretto in D minor; No. 3 Vivace in F major; No. 4 Andante flebile in A minor.
- Op. 33, Grande sonate 'Les quatre âges' (1848)
  20 ans in B minor; 30 ans: Quasi-Faust in D♯ minor; 40 ans: Un heureux ménage in G major; 50 ans: Prométhée enchaîne in G♯ minor.
- Op. 34, Scherzo-focoso in B minor (1848)
- Op. 35, Douze études dans tous les tons majeurs (1848)

No. 1 Allegretto in A major
No. 2 Allegro in D major
No. 3 Andantino in G major
No. 4 Presto in C major
No. 5 Allegro barbaro in F major
No. 6 Allegramente in B♭ major
No. 7 L'incendie au village voisin ("Fire in the neighboring village") in E♭ major
No. 8 Lento appassionato in A♭ major
No. 9 Contrapunctus in C♯ major
No. 10 Chant d'amour - Chant de mort: Et quando expectavi lumen, venit caligo ("Song of love - Song of death: And when I looked for light, darkness came") in G♭ major
No. 11 Posément in B major
No. 12 Andando: Technique des octaves in E major

- Op. 37, Trois marches quasi da cavalleria (1857)
  No. 1 Molto Allegro in A minor; No. 2 Allegro vivace in A minor; No. 3 Allegro - Più Presto in C minor
- Op. 38a, Premier recueil de chants (1857)

No. 1 Assez vivement in E major
No. 2 Sérénade in A minor
No. 3 Chœur in A major
No. 4 L'offrande in A major
No. 5 Agitatissimo in F♯ minor
No. 6 Barcarolle in G minor

- Op. 38b, Deuxième recueil de chants (1857)

No. 1 Hymne in E major
No. 2 Allegretto ("Fa") in A minor
No. 3 Chant de Guerre in A major
No. 4 Procession-Nocturne in A major
No. 5 Andantino in F♯ minor
No. 6 Barcarolle en chœur in G minor

- Op. 39, Douze études dans tous les tons mineurs (1857)

No. 1 Comme le vent ("Like the wind") in A minor
No. 2 En rhythme molossique ("In Molossian rhythm") in D minor
No. 3 Scherzo diabolico ("Diabolic scherzo") in G minor
No. 4 Symphony for solo piano: Allegro moderato in C minor
No. 5 Symphony for solo piano: Marche funèbre (Andantino) in F minor
No. 6 Symphony for solo piano: Menuet in B♭ minor
No. 7 Symphony for solo piano: Finale (Presto) in E♭ minor
No. 8 Concerto for solo piano: Allegro assai in G♯ minor
No. 9 Concerto for solo piano: Adagio in C♯ minor
No. 10 Concerto for solo piano: Allegretto alla barbaresca in F♯ minor
No. 11 Ouverture in B minor
No. 12 Le festin d'Ésope (Aesop's feast) in E minor

- Op. 40, 3 marches for piano 4 hands (1857)
  No. 1 Allegro in A♭ major; No. 2 Allegro moderato in E♭ major; No. 3 Modérément in B♭ major
- Op. 41, Trois petites fantaisies (1857)
  No. 1 Assez gravement in A minor; No. 2 Andantino in G major; No. 3 Presto in B♭ major
- Op. 42, Réconciliation - petit caprice mi-partie en forme de zorcico, ou Air de Danse Basque à cinq temps in C major (1857)
- Op. 45, Salut, cendre de pauvre!, paraphrase (texte de Legouvé) in B♭ major (1856)
- Op. 46, Minuetto alla tedesca in A minor (1857)
- Op. 47, Sonate de concert in E major for cello and pianoforte (1857); viola and piano transcription by Casimir Ney
  Allegro molto in E major; Allegrettino in A♭ major; Adagio in C major; Finale alla Saltarella in E minor
- Op. 50, Capriccio alla soldatesca in A minor (1859)
- Op. 50 bis, Le tambour bat aux champs, esquisse pour piano in B minor (1859)
- Op. 51, Trois menuets (1859)
  No. 1 Tempo giusto in E♭ major; No. 2 Tempo debole in G minor; No. 3 Tempo nobile in G major
- Op. 52, Super flumina Babylonis, paraphrase du psaume 137 in G minor (1859)
- Op. 53, Quasi-caccia in A major (1859)
- Op. 54, Benedictus for pedal piano in D minor (1859)
- Op. 55, Une fusée, Introduction et impromptu in D minor (1859)
- Op. 57, 2e.et 3e. Nocturnes (1859)
  No. 1 Deuxième Nocturne in B minor; No. 2 Troisième Nocturne in F♯ major
- Op. 60, Deux petites pièces pour piano (1859)
  No. 1 Ma chère liberté in F♯ major; No. 2 Ma chère servitude in A minor
- Op. 60bis, Le grillon (Quatrième Nocturne) in B major (1859)
- Op. 61, Sonatine pour piano in A minor (1861)
  Allegro vivace in A minor; Allegramente in F major; Scherzo-Minuetto in D minor; Tempo giusto in A minor
- Op. 63, 48 Motifs (Esquisses) (1861). Despite the title given by the composer, there are in fact 49 pieces in the collection.

No. 1 La Vision, C major
No. 2 Le Staccatissimo, F minor
No. 3 Le Legatissimo, D major
No. 4 Les Cloches, G minor
No. 5 Les Initiés, E major
No. 6 Fuguette, A minor
No. 7 Le Frisson, F♯ major
No. 8 Pseudo-Naïveté, B minor
No. 9 Confidence, A♭ major
No. 10 Increpatio, C♯ minor
No. 11 Les Soupirs, B♭ major
No. 12 Barcarollette, E♭ minor
No. 13 Ressouvenir, C minor
No. 14 Duettino, F major
No. 15 Tutti de Concerto dans le genre ancien, D minor
No. 16 Fantaisie, G major
No. 17 Petit prélude à 3, E minor
No. 18 Liedchen, A major
No. 19 Grâces, F♯ minor
No. 20 Petite Marche Villageoise, B major
No. 21 Morituri te salutant, G♯ minor
No. 22 Innocenzia, D♭ major
No. 23 L'homme aux sabots, B♭ minor
No. 24 Contredanse, E♭ major
No. 25 La Poursuite, C major
No. 26 Petit Air, G minor
No. 27 Rigaudon, D major
No. 28 Inflexibilité, A minor
No. 29 Délire, E major
No. 30 Petit Air Dolent, B minor
No. 31 Début de Quatuor, F♯ major
No. 32 Minuettino, alla "vedrai carino" de Mozart, C♯ minor
No. 33 Fais Dodo, A♭ major
No. 34 Odi profanum vulgus et arceo: favete linguis, E♭ minor
No. 35 Musique Militaire, B♭ major
No. 36 Toccatina, F minor
No. 37 Scherzettino, C minor
No. 38 Les Bons Souhaits: Le ciel vous soit toujours prospère!, G major
No. 39 Héraclite et Démocrite, D minor
No. 40 Attendez-moi sous l'orme, A major
No. 41 Les Enharmoniques, E minor
No. 42 Petit Air à 5 voix, B major
No. 43 Notturnino-Innamorato, F♯ minor
No. 44 Transports, C♯ major
No. 45 Les diablotins, G♯ minor
No. 46 Le Premier Billet Doux, E♭ major
No. 47 Scherzetto, B♭ minor
No. 48 En Songe, F major
No. 49 Laus Deo, C major

- Op. 64, 13 prières for organ or pedal piano (1866)

No. 1 Andantino, G major
No. 2 Moderato, A major
No. 3 Poco adagio, E minor
No. 4 Moderatamente, B♭ major
No. 5 Adagio, F major
No. 6 Moderato, D major
No. 7 Maestoso, A minor
No. 8 Deus Sabaoth, B♭ major
No. 9 Doucement, E major
No. 10 Assez lentement, B♭ major
No. 11 Andantino, E major
No. 12 Allegretto, F major
No. 13 Largement et majesteusement, G major

- Op. 65, Troisième recueil de chants (1866)

No. 1 Vivante in E major
No. 2 Esprits follets in A minor
No. 3 En canon à l'octave in A major
No. 4 Tempo giusto in A major
No. 5 Horace et Lydie in F♯ minor
No. 6 Barcarolle in G minor

- Op. 66, 11 grands préludes et un transcription du Messie de Hændel for organ, harmonium or pedal piano (1865)

No. 1 Allegro in F major
No. 2 Allegro moderato in D minor
No. 3 Andantino in B♭ major
No. 4 Moderamento in G minor
No. 5 Quasi-Adagio in E♭ major
No. 6 Andantino in C minor
No. 7 Andante in A♭ major
No. 8 Tempo giusto in F minor
No. 9 Langsam in D♭ major
No. 10 Scherzando in B♭ minor
No. 11 Lento in F♯ major
No. 12 Nos. 26 et 27 du Messie de Hændel in E♭ minor

- Op. 67, Quatrième recueil de chants (1868)

No. 1 Neige et lave in E major
No. 2 Chanson de la bonne vieille in A minor
No. 3 Bravement in A major
No. 4 Doucement in A major
No. 5 Appassionato in F♯ minor
No. 6 Barcarolle in G minor

- Op. 69, Impromptu sur le choral de Luther "Un fort rempart est notre Dieu" for pedal piano in E♭ major (1866)
- Op. 70, Cinquième recueil de chants (1872)

No. 1 Duettino in E major
No. 2 Andantinetto in A minor
No. 3 Allegro vivace in A major
No. 4 La voix de l'instrument in A major
No. 5 Scherzo-coro in F♯ minor
Récapitulation en guise de Transition, ou Introduction, pour le numéro suivant
No. 6 Barcarolle in G minor

- Op. 72, 11 pièces dans le style religieux, et un transcription du Messie de Hændel for organ, harmonium or pedal piano (1867)

No. 1 Tempo giustissimo in C major
No. 2 Andantino in A major
No. 3 Quasi-Adagio in D minor
No. 4 Assez doucement in G major
No. 5 Lentement in D minor
No. 6 Majesteusement in B♭ major
No. 7 Molto moderato in F major
No. 8 Assez vite in A minor
No. 9 Assez lentement in E♭ major
No. 10 Modérément in D minor
No. 11 Dolcemente in A minor
No. 12 No. 13 du Messie de Hændel in B major

- Op. 74, Les Mois (1838) - See 12 morceaux caractéristiques in 'Without opus numbers' below.
- Op. 75, Toccatina in C minor (1872)
- Op. 76, Trois grandes études for piano (1839). Originally published without opus number.
  No. 1 Fantaisie in A♭ major for the left hand; No. 2 Introduction, Variations et Finale in D major for the right hand; No. 3 Mouvement semblable et perpetuel (Rondo-Toccata) in C minor for hands reunited

== Without opus numbers ==
=== Piano solo ===
- 12 morceaux caractéristiques (c. 1838). Nos. 1, 4, 5, 7, 8, and 12 subsequently published as 6 morceaux caractéristiques op. 8 (in Leipzig) and op. 16 (Paris). Later republished complete as op. 74.

No. 1 Une nuit d'hiver in G minor
No. 2 Carnaval in E minor
No. 3 La retraite in D major
No. 4 La Pâque in A major
No. 5 La Sérénade in F♯ minor
No. 6 Promenade sur l'eau in A major
No. 7 Une nuit d'été in A major
No. 8 Les moissonneurs in E♭ major
No. 9 L'hallali in D major
No. 10 Gros temps in D minor
No. 11 Le mourant in C minor
No. 12 L'opéra in D♭ major

- Étude in A minor (1840)
- Jean qui pleure et Jean qui rit (1840)

No. 1 Jean qui pleure in E minor
No. 2 Jean qui rit in C major

- Variations à la vielle in C major (1841)
- Variations sur un air favori de l'opéra Ugo (1842)
- Désir. Fantaisie pour piano in A♭ major (1844)
- Impromptu in F♯ major, for piano (1845)
- Appassionato in D major, sketch of op. 63, no. 29 (1847, unfinished)
- Ouverture de l'opéra 'Le prophète' de Meyerbeer arrangée pour piano (1850)
- Les Regrets de la Nonnette. Petite mélodie pour piano in G minor (1854)
- Palpitamento in A major (1855)
- Etude alla Barbaro in F major, for piano (1857)
- Petit conte pour le Piano in E♭ major (1859)
- Pour Monsieur Gurkhaus in G major (1863)
- Zorcico. Danse Iberienne in D minor, for piano (1864)
- Vivement in C minor (1866, unfinished) (from Bulletin No. 106 of the Alkan Society)
- Fantasticheria pour Piano in B minor (1868)
- Chapeau bas! in F♯ minor (1872)

=== Piano 4 hands ===
- Finale (1840) (later published with the duplicate opus number op. 17)
- Fantaisie à 4 mains sur Don Juan in E minor–C major (1844) (later published with the duplicate opus number op.26)
- Ouverture de l'opéra 'Le prophète' de Meyerbeer arrangée pour piano à quatre mains. (1850)
- Saltarelle, Finale de la Sonate de Concert pour Piano et Violoncelle, arrangée à 4 mains (1866)

=== Organ ===
- Pro Organo in C minor, for organ (1850)
- Petits préludes sur les huit gammes du plain-chant, for organ (1859)

No. 1 Moderato in D Dorian
No. 2 Andantino in D Hypodorian
No. 3 Tempo giusto in E Phrygian
No. 4 Vivace in E Hypophrygian
No. 5 Andante in F Lydian
No. 6 Poco lento in F Hypolydian
No. 7 Andantino in G Mixolydian
No. 8 Moderato in G Hypomixolydian

=== Organ or pédalier ===
- 12 Études d'orgue ou piano à pédalier pour les pieds seulement (12 Etudes for organ or pedal piano for the feet only) (1866)

No. 1 Moderato in C minor
No. 2 Adagio in C minor
No. 3 Fughetta - Moderato in A minor
No. 4 Moderato in E♭ major
No. 5 Moderato in A minor
No. 6 Adagio in C♯ minor
No. 7 Allegro in A major
No. 8 Enérgicamente in D minor
No. 9 Leggiermente - Moderato in D major
No. 10 Moderato in D major
No. 11 Adagio in F minor
No. 12 Tempo giusto in C major

- Bombardo-Carillon in B♭ major for pedal duet (four feet) (1872)

=== Pédalier ===
- Etude, pour Piano à Clavier de Pedales in D major (1872) (ms., unfinished)

=== Vocal ===
- Hermann et Ketty, for soprano, tenor and orchestra (1832) (ms., unpublished)
- L'Entrée en loge, for tenor and orchestra (1834) (ms., unpublished)
- Etz chajjim hi, for two sopranos, tenor and bass without accompaniment in C major (1847)
- Trois Anciennes Mélodies Juives (Three old Jewish melodies), for voice and piano (1854)
  No. 1 Chant de Nouvel An in D minor
  No. 2 Consolation et espérance in A minor
  No. 3 Quand Israël sortit d'Égypte in F major
- 2er verset du 41me Psaume (42me de la Vulgate) (Verse 2 of the 41st Psalm (42nd of the Vulgate)), for voice and piano in E major (1855) (ms., unpublished)
- Air tiré de J.S. Bach de la cantate 'Wie schön leuchtet der Morgenstern' arr. soprano and piano in A♭ major (1855) (ms., unpublished)
- Halelouyoh, for soprano, contralto, tenor, bass and piano or organ in G minor (1857)
- Stances de Millevoye, for three female voices and piano (1859)
- Marcia funèbre, sulla morte d'un Pappagallo in C minor, for two sopranos, tenor, bass, three oboes and bassoon (1859)
- Paix à la paix, hymn for solo voice in A major (1867)

=== Other ===
- Pas-redoublé in E♭ major, for concert band (1840)
- Allegro agitato (A son confrère P: Cavallo), for string quartet in C minor (1846, 6 bars, unfinished ms.)

== Lost works (without opus numbers) ==
These works are listed in François-Sappey and Luguenot's biography on Alkan.

- Allegretto and Finale of the Seventh Symphony of Beethoven, arr. for two pianos, eight hands (1838)
- Works for string quintet and string sextet (1840s)
- Symphony for a large orchestra B minor (1844) (not the same as the Symphony for piano solo)
  Allegro; Scherzo; Adagio: וַיֹּאמֶר אֱלֹהִים "יְהִי אוֹר" וַיְהִי-אוֹר; Finale
- Acte d'opéra (unperformed, mentioned in the press in 1846 and 1847)
- Romance du phare d'Eddystone for voice and piano (1847)
- Cadenza for the first movement of a piano concerto of Handel (1869)
- 1st Marche Militaire of Schubert (op. 51, D. 733), arr. for piano (1877)
- Fiat lux, 1e. étude biblique pour orchestre, orchestral version and version arranged for piano (before 1881)

These works are listed in William Alexander Eddie's "Charles Valentin Alkan: his life and his music" page 36

- La Journée (1881?)
- Le Retour au Village (1881?)

Other lost works from other sources.

- L’Idylle (1843?) (from La France musicale report on a concert given by Alkan in December 31, 1843: Paris)
- Trios, string quintets and string sextets (1840's) (from d'Ortigue's review of Alkan's concert, February 27, 1844: Salle Vivienne, Paris)
- Siciliana and 1^{st} Allegro from two concertos by Handel with Cadenza in F major (1872?) (From two distinct programme prints. The Siciliana is the third movement of Handel's Organ Concerto HWV 293. The identity of the 1^{st} Allegro is uncomfirmed but might be the second movement of the Concerto The Cuckoo and the Nightingale, HWV 295, which features an Organo ad libitum at the end.)
- Adagio of the Piano Concerto No. 4 of Beethoven, arr. for piano (1874?) (Based on the programme print of 1874 season of the Petits Concerts de Musique Classique)
- Andante of the Piano Concerto No. 5 of Beethoven, arr. for piano (1877?) (from a report of Revue et Gazette Musicale, page 121, of the 4th concert of the year 1877 of the Petits Concerts de Musique Classique)
