= Op. 39 =

In music, Op. 39 stands for Opus number 39. Compositions that are assigned this number include:

- Alkan – Comme le vent
- Alkan – En rythme molossique
- Alkan – Le festin d'Ésope
- Alkan – Scherzo diabolico
- Brahms – 16 Waltzes
- Britten – Albert Herring
- Busoni – Piano Concerto
- Chopin – Scherzo No. 3
- Dvořák – Czech Suite
- Elgar – Pomp and Circumstance Marches
- Ginastera – Piano Concerto No. 2
- Hindemith – Cardillac
- Margaret – Befreit
- Mendelssohn – Drei Motetten
- Myaskovsky – Symphony No. 16
- Oswald – String Quartet No. 3
- Prokofiev – Quintet
- Rachmaninoff – Études-Tableaux, Op. 39
- Schumann – Liederkreis, Op. 39
- Sibelius – Symphony No. 1 in E minor (1899, revised 1900)
