= Douze Études dans tous les tons mineurs, Opus 39 =

Romantic composition by Charles-Valentin Alkan

Douze Études dans tous les tons mineurs
- Piano études by Charles-Valentin Alkan
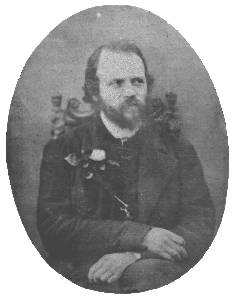
- Photo of Alkan sitting
- English: Twelve Etudes in the Minor Keys
- Opus: 39
- Period: Romantic period music
- Published: 1857
- Movements: 12

Douze Études dans tous les tons mineurs, Opus 39 (12 studies in the minor keys) is a set of twelve etudes in all the minor keys by French composer Charles-Valentin Alkan. The set opens in A minor with Comme le vent and goes through the circle of fourths until ending on E minor with a theme and variations entitled Le Festin d'Ésope. Published in 1857 the set is idiomatic of Alkan's unique style of piano composition, consisting of large almost orchestral sounding chords, fast-paced scale configurations, and insistent rhythmic repetition. A performance of the entire set is roughly two hours with the eighth of the set (the first movement of the famous Concerto for Solo Piano) alone being around 30 minutes in length.

== Etudes in the set ==
| Name | Key |
|---|---|
| I. Comme le vent | A minor |
| II. En rythme molossique | D minor |
| III. Scherzo-diabolico | G minor |
Symphony for Solo Piano
| IV. Allegro Moderato | C minor |
| V. Marche funèbre | F minor |
| VI. Menuet | B♭ minor |
| VII. Presto | E♭ minor |
Concerto for Solo Piano
| VIII. Allegro assai | G♯ minor |
| IX. Adagio | C♯ minor |
| X. Allegretto alla barbaresca | F♯ minor |
| XI. Overture | B minor |
| XII. Le Festin d'Ésope | E minor |

== History ==
Before his Douze études dans tous les tons mineurs Alkan published a set of twelve major key etudes (Douze Études dans tous les tons majeurs, opus 35) in 1848, almost a decade before the minor key etudes. The major key etudes mark the sixth entry into the genre and the first of this scope by Alkan. However, the set saw little attention when published possibly due to the Revolution of 1848 which had firmly upset the musical environment in France, furthermore Alkan's Symphony published 1844 (since lost) and his Grande Sonata, opus 33 published later in 1847 remained ignored by the Parisian music scene. These failures mark the beginning of reclusion (a reoccurring theme in Alkans life) from public life coming into full affect when the Polish composer and pianist Frédéric Chopin died on the 17th of October 1849 leaving Alkan, who was a close friend, extremely distraught and giving up performance even for close friends. Alkan remained virtually unheard from until 1857 where he remerges suddenly with a flurry of publications all in the same year. These publications included sets of miniatures and marches along with the minor key etudes; it also was the year of publication of his opus 47 sonata for cello and piano. This output shows that Alkan was not idle during his disappearance but instead extremely active as these minor key etudes alone contain two hundred and seventy-four pages of material.

Though a secular work, Robert Rimm notes that the theme of the last etudes contains hints of Hasidic dance music showing that his Jewish identity still influenced the creation of the minor key etudes.

== Recordings of the Complete Op. 39 Set ==
| Pianist | Album | Recorded | Publisher |
| Ronald Smith | Alkan: 12 Studies in the minor keys, Op. 39 | 1978 | His Master's Voice |
| Jack Gibbons | 12 Études Op. 39 | 1995 | ASV |
| Michael Nanasakov (virtual pianist) | Alkan: 12 Etudes in all minor keys | 1998 | Nanasawa Articulates |
| Stephanie McCallum | Alkan: Twelve Études in the minor keys, Op. 39 | 2006 | ABC Classics |
| Vincenzo Maltempo | Alkan Genius-Emigna (Compilation) | 2015 | Piano Classics |
