= En rythme molossique =

En rythme molossique (In molossian rhythm) is the second of the Douze Études dans tous les tons mineurs, Opus 39 for solo piano by the French composer Charles-Valentin Alkan, published in 1846. It is in D minor. The piece is in rondo form, with two episodes, and is mostly driven by the rhythm. Ronald Smith compares the theme to the octaves in canon of the minuet from Joseph Haydn's string quartet (Op. 76 No. 2).

The first episode is lighter in mood, but the rhythm is still pervasive.

In the second episode, the rhythm dissolves into a crotchet followed by a minim, and flowing semiquavers appear throughout.

The original theme returns only after the second episode concludes, in double counterpoint with the second episode, and the climax then occurs with both episodes being combined. Finally, the flowing semiquavers of the second episode reappear once more in the coda in D major, with the rhythm being repeated over and over again in the bass, and the work ends, referencing Beethoven's Tempest Sonata, also in D minor.

Kaikhosru Shapurji Sorabji considered this piece to be one of the "most original" of the Op. 39 set, "the dour, harsh, heavy brutality of the rhythm is magnificently expressed."

This piece has been performed by Ronald Smith, Jack Gibbons, Stephanie McCallum, Yui Morishita, Vincenzo Maltempo etc.
