= Esquisses (Alkan) =

Piano pieces by Charles-Valentin Alkan

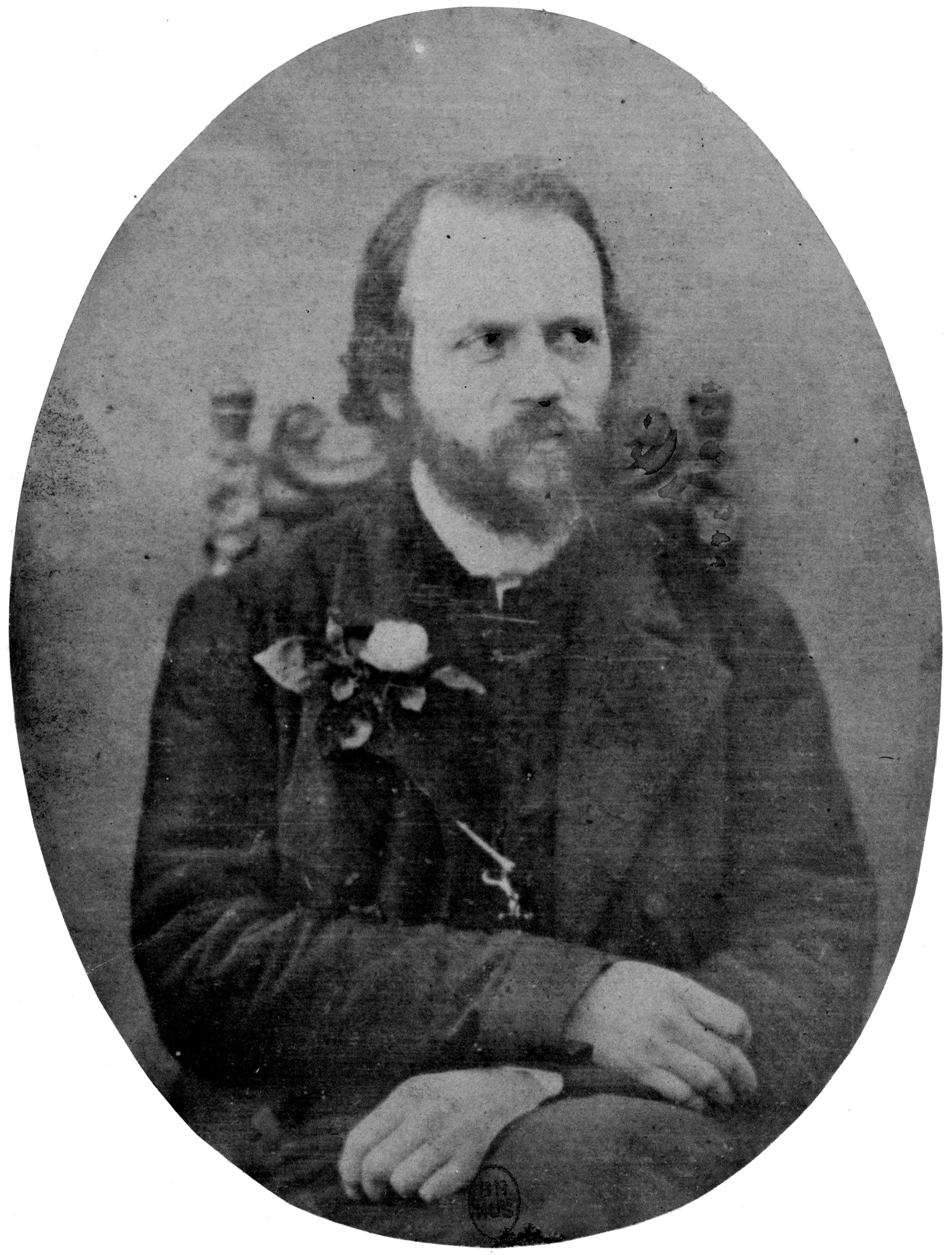
Charles-Valentin Alkan

Esquisses (Sketches), Op. 63, is a set of 49 short piano pieces by French composer Charles-Valentin Alkan and published in 1861. The pieces are divided into four books; the first pair of books and the last pair each comprise between them pieces in each of all the major and minor keys. Book 4 ends with an extra, unnumbered, piece, Laus Deo, in C major. Four pianists have recorded the set in its entirety: Laurent Martin, Osamu Nakamura (now Osamu Kanazawa), Steven Osborne, and Yui Morishita (twice).

Unlike many other of Alkan's pieces, such as the Op. 33 Grand Sonate and the Op. 39 set of etudes in all the minor keys, these 49 pieces do not focus mainly on virtuosity and transcendentalism and instead contain more of Alkan's sentimental and evocative writing. Alkan's innovation is also vividly present in the pieces. The 45th piece, Les Diablotins, features wrenched cluster chords and the 48th piece, En Songe, is a dreamy and quiet piece all except for the very final chord, which is a sudden F major chord with the dynamic ff. The 39th piece, Héraclite et Démocrite, features two sharply contrasting themes for the respective philosophers, and at some passages Alkan overlaps the themes to create a solemn and sad theme in the left hand and a bouncy and joyous theme in the right.

== The Esquisses ==
Book 1
1. La Vision in C major
2. Le Staccatissimo in F minor
3. Le Legatissimo in D major
4. Les Cloches in G minor
5. Les Initiés in E major (features a quote from Aristophanes' The Frogs instead of a title in some editions)
6. Fuguette in A minor
7. Le Frisson in F♯ major
8. Pseudo-Naïveté in B minor
9. Confidence in A♭ major
10. Increpatio in C♯ minor
11. Les Soupirs in B♭ major
12. Barcarollette in E♭ minor
Book 2
13. Ressouvenir in C minor
14. Duettino in F major
15. Tutti de Concerto dans le genre ancien in D minor
16. Fantasie in G major
17. Petit prélude à trois in E minor
18. Liedchen in A major
19. Grâces in F♯ minor
20. Petit marche villageoise in B major
21. Morituri te salutant in G♯ minor
22. Innocenzia in D♭ major
23. L'homme aux sabots in B♭ minor
24. Contredanse in E♭ major
Book 3
25. La poursuite in C major
26. Petit air, Genre ancien in G minor
27. Rigaudon in D major
28. Inflexibilité (also known as Rigidité) in A minor
29. Délire in E major
30. Petit air dolent in B minor
31. Début de quatuor in F♯ major
32. Minuetto in C♯ minor
33. "Fais dodo" in A♭ major
34. Odi profanum vulgus et arceo, Favete linguis in E♭ minor
35. Musique militaire in B♭ major
36. Toccatina in F minor
Book 4
37. Scherzettino in C minor
38. "Le ciel vous soit toujours prospére" (also known as Les bons souhaits) in G major
39. Héraclite et Démocrite in D minor
40. "Attendez-moi sous l'orme" in A major
41. Les enharmoniques in E minor
42. Petit air à 5 voix in B major
43. Notturino-Innamorato in F♯ minor
44. Transports in C♯ major
45. Les diablotins in G♯ minor
46. Le premiere billet doux in E♭ major
47. Scherzetto in B♭ minor
48. En songe in F major
49. Laus Deo in C major

== See also ==
- List of compositions by Charles-Valentin Alkan
- Music written in all 24 major and minor keys
