= Symphony for Solo Piano (Alkan) =

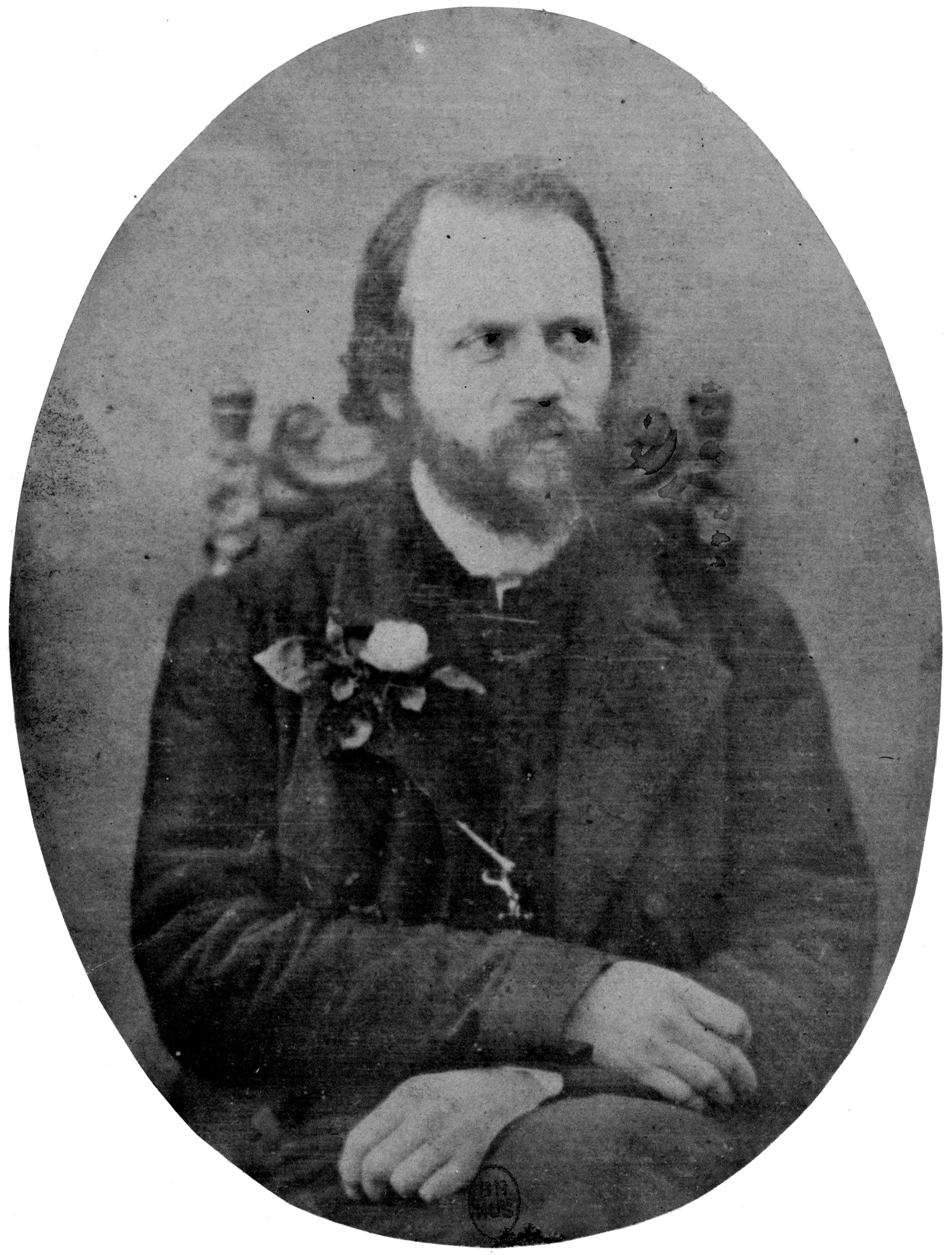
Charles-Valentin Alkan

The Symphony for Solo Piano is a large-scale romantic work for piano composed by Charles-Valentin Alkan and published in 1857.

Although it is generally performed as a self-contained work, it comprises études Nos. 4–7 from the Douze études dans tous les tons mineurs (Twelve Studies in All the Minor Keys), Op. 39, each title containing the word Symphonie (French: Symphony). The four movements are

1. Allegro moderato
2. Marche funèbre
3. Menuet
4. Finale

Much like the Concerto for Solo Piano (Nos. 8–10), the Symphony is written so as to evoke the broad palette of timbres and harmonic textures available to an orchestra. It is an early example of a piano symphony. In the opinion of François Luguenot, it "does not contain the excesses of [Alkan's] Concerto or the Grande Sonate (Op. 33). But, rather like [Alkan's] Sonatine Op. 61, it proves that Alkan was also capable of writing perfectly balanced and almost ‘Classical’ works." Unlike a standard classical symphony, each movement is in a different key, rising in progressive tonality by a perfect fourth.

== Description ==
=== I. Allegro moderato ===
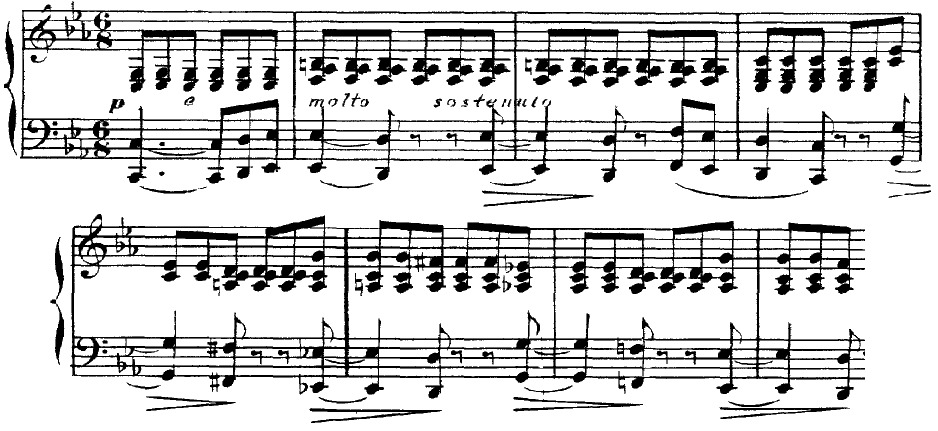
Opening theme of the first movement

The opening movement in C minor is written in sonata form. The thematic material of the Allegro moderato is almost entirely derived from the opening theme, which appears in octaves in the left hand.

=== II. Marche funèbre ===
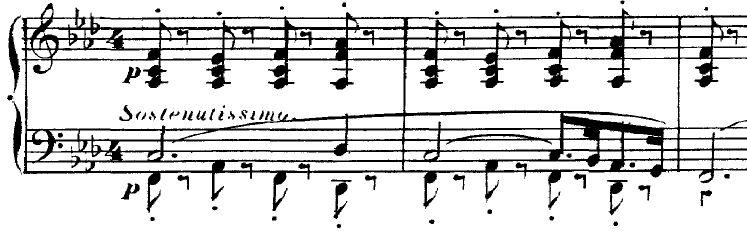
Opening of the Funeral March

The second movement, played Andantino, is in ternary form with a legato melody over staccato chords in the first section and a lyrical chorale in the middle section.

Luguenot wrote:

The second movement is a funeral march in F minor and rather Mahlerian in style. In the original edition the title page read ‘Symphonie: No 2. Marcia funebre sulla morte d’un Uomo da bene ['Funeral march on the death of a good man’], words which have sadly been lost in all subsequent editions. Of course one is reminded of the subtitle of the ‘Marcia funebre’ in Beethoven’s third symphony. But might we not regard this ‘uomo da bene’ as Alkan’s father, Alkan Morhange, who died in 1855, two years before these studies were published?

Jack Gibbons wrote: "The funeral march's sense of restraint is borne out by Alkan's marking over the gentle central section, 'with contained sorrow' . . . The distant drum roll that interrupts the march near its close adds an Alkanesque sense of disquiet to this already sombre music."

=== III. Menuet ===
The Menuet is in ternary form, like the Marche funèbre. Luguenot writes that "the Minuet in B♭ minor is in fact a scherzo that anticipates shades of Bruckner—full of energy and brightened by a lyrical trio." Adrian Corleonis suggests that "Berlioz and Haydn are in closest proximity in the hectic Minuet, combining the spirit of the Ronde du Sabbat and Marche au Supplice from the former's Symphonie Fantastique, with a palpable debt to the Minuet from the latter's "Les Quintes" Quartet, Op. 76 No. 2, which Alkan transcribed."

=== IV. Finale ===
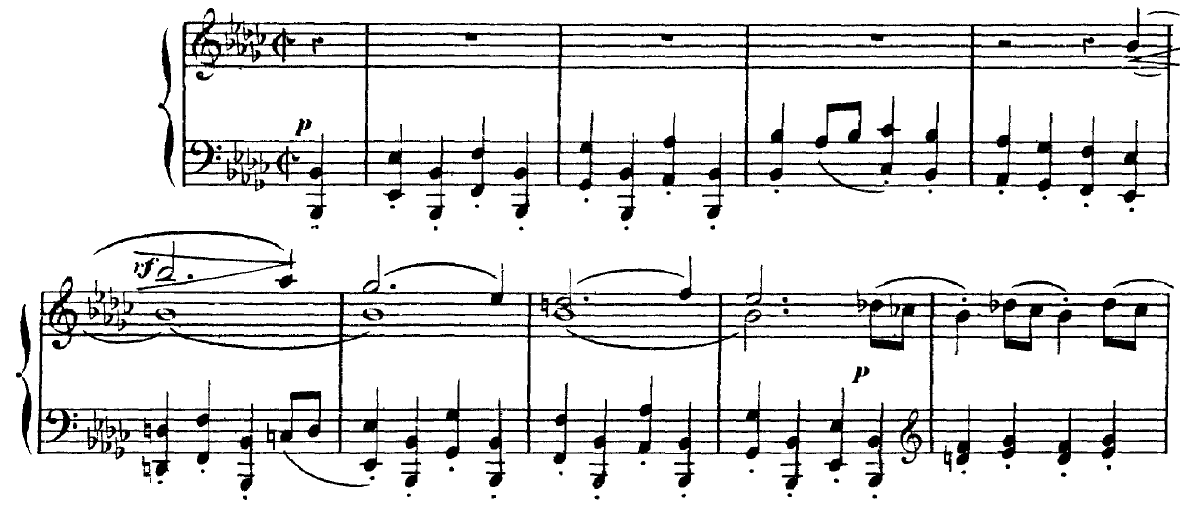
Opening of the Finale

The final movement is extremely technically demanding. Luguenot comments that "the final Presto in E♭ minor, memorably described by Raymond Lewenthal as a ‘ride in hell’, brings the work to a breathless close."

== Performance history ==
In the opinion of Gibbons: "That music of this quality has remained neglected in the 150 or so years since its creation is a shocking scandal . . . Alkan performed extracts of the work himself at his series of 'Petits Concerts' in Paris in the 1870s but the next notable performance wasn't until 1938 when Egon Petri performed the Symphony for BBC radio in London. Gramophone recordings of the work didn't appear for another 25 years, and though today the work is performed more often than at any time in the past, its appearance in a concert programme is still unusual."

== See also ==
- Piano symphony
- Concerto for Solo Piano (Alkan)
