= Concerto for solo piano =

Musical work for a solo pianist

While a concerto is generally a piece for an instrument or instruments with orchestral accompaniment, some works for piano alone have been written with the seemingly contradictory designation concerto for solo piano.

== History ==
Although various "concert" pieces have been written across history (such as Liszt's Trois études de concert and Grand solo de concert), concertos for solo piano are very rare. The first (and still best known) example comes from Johann Sebastian Bach, whose Italian Concerto, BWV 971, was published in 1735. Even though it was written for two-manual harpsichord, it is regularly played on the piano and considered the first example of a concerto fitted to solo keyboard.

Schumann's Piano Sonata No. 3 in F minor (1835), Op. 14, was labelled by Tobias Haslinger as a "Concerto without orchestra".

The French composer Charles-Valentin Alkan wrote in 1857 his set of Op. 39 études, of which nos. 8–10 were labelled as a concerto for solo piano. It includes markings such as "Tutti", "Solo" and "Piano", as well as instrumental directions such as "quasi-trombe" and "quasi-celli".

The Spanish composer Joaquín Turina wrote in 1935 his Concerto Without Orchestra (Spanish: Concierto sin orquesta), Op. 88.

The Russian composer and violinist Joseph Achron wrote in 1941 his final work Concerto for solo piano, op. 74.

Kaikhosru Shapurji Sorabji's Concerto da suonare da me solo e senza orchestra, per divertirmi (1946) is clearly inspired by Alkan; for instance, the third movement of the work is titled Scherzo diabolico—a reference to Alkan's Étude Op. 39 No. 3. In addition to that, the first movement of the work contains various programmatic indications. These, however, are controversial, since they effectively refer to an imaginary orchestra. However, it has also been argued that the orchestra is represented in the work by means of bitonal relationships.

The Slovak composer Ján Zimmer wrote, in addition to seven concertos for piano and orchestra, a Concerto for Piano without orchestra, op. 23 (1955/1956).

The piano concertos nos. 4 and 6 of Michael Finnissy are pieces for solo piano.

John White has described his Piano Sonata No. 152 as a concerto for solo piano.

== Similar works ==
- Various arrangements (by Bach, Alkan, et al.) of piano concertos for piano alone; for instance, Alkan made such transcriptions of Beethoven's 3rd Piano Concerto and Mozart's Piano Concerto No. 20.
- Wilhelm Friedemann Bach – Concerto for Harpsichord Solo (F 40)
- Muzio Clementi - Sonata quasi Concerto, Op. 33 No. 3
- Frédéric Chopin's Allegro de concert Op. 46 (1841) is a single movement piece, which was intended to form part of what would have become Chopin's 3rd concerto for piano and orchestra.
- Franz Liszt – Concerto sans Orchestra S.524a (1839-1857)
- Igor Stravinsky – Concerto per due pianoforti soli (1935)
- Vincent Persichetti – Concerto for Piano (4 hands) Op. 56 (1952)
- Dmitri Shostakovich – Concertino for two pianos (1953)

== See also ==
- Piano symphony
