= Le Festin d'Ésope =

Étude composed by Charles-Valentin Alkan

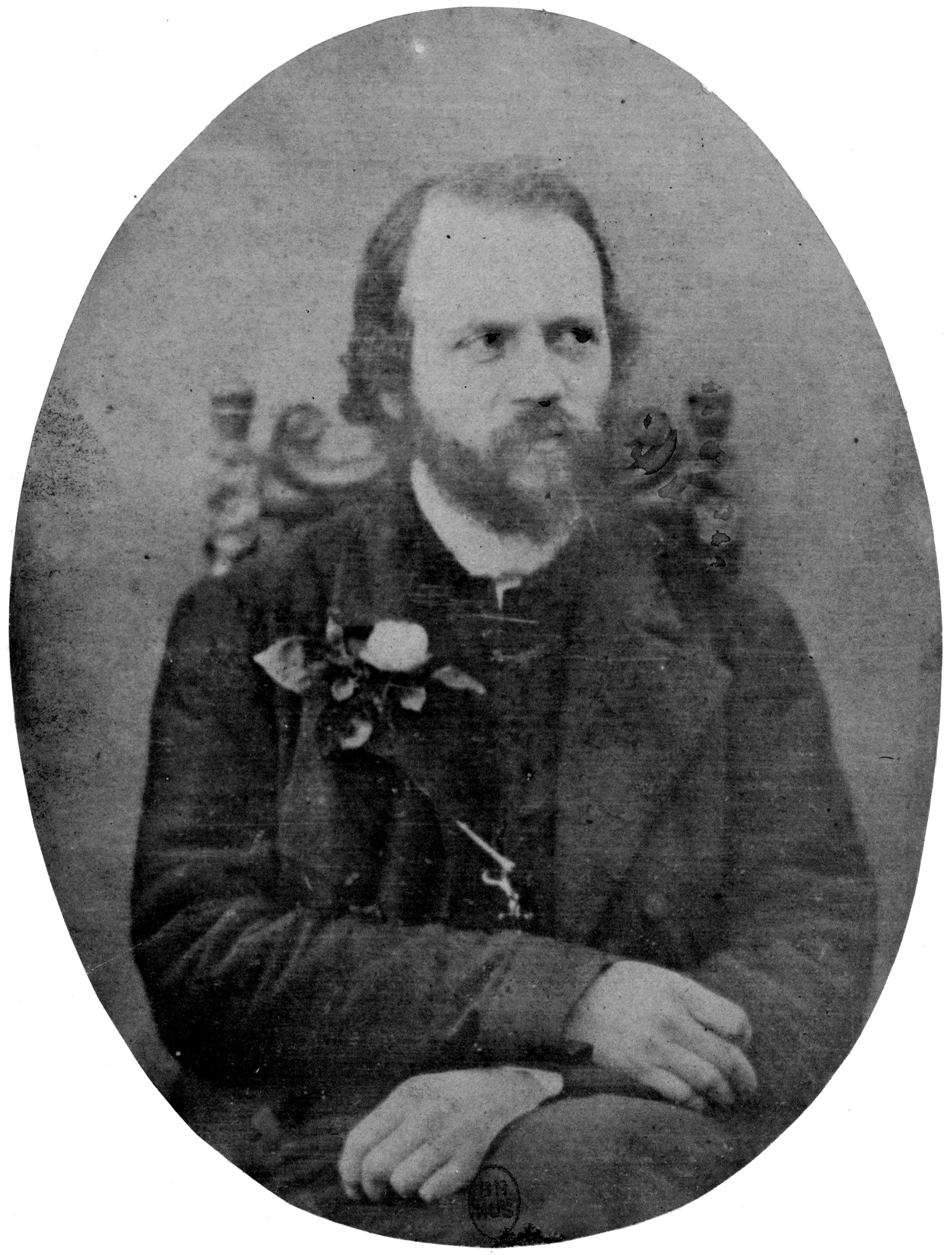
Charles-Valentin Alkan

Le Festin d'Ésope (Aesop's Feast), Op. 39 No. 12, is a piano étude by Charles-Valentin Alkan. It is the final étude in the set Douze études dans tous les tons mineurs (Twelve studies in all minor keys), Op. 39, published in 1857 (although it may have been written during the previous decade). It consists of twenty-five variations based on an original theme and is in E minor. The technical skills required in the variations are a summation of the preceding études.

The work requires exceptional virtuosic skills, with extremely fast overlapping octaves, fast scales with left accompaniments, enormous leaps, rapid octave chords, tremolos, double octaves and trills. A typical performance of this piece lasts 10 minutes.

== Aesop's feast ==
According to legend, Xanthus required his slave Aesop to arrange a feast containing every variety of food. However, at the feast all the guests were served with tongue, which, Aesop explained, encompassed every variety of human knowledge and emotion.

Although this story is indicated by Alkan's title, and is in itself a parable about the variation form, there seem to be clear indications in the music, from the animal noises suggested, to Aesop's many fables about animals.

== The music ==
Marked "Allegretto senza licenza quantunque" ("Rather fast, without any licence"), the piece is to be played without rubato. The metronome is marked at 126 beats per minute.

The similarity of Alkan's theme to minor versions of "Baa, Baa, Black Sheep" and "Down By the Station, Early in the Morning" is coincidental.

Theme

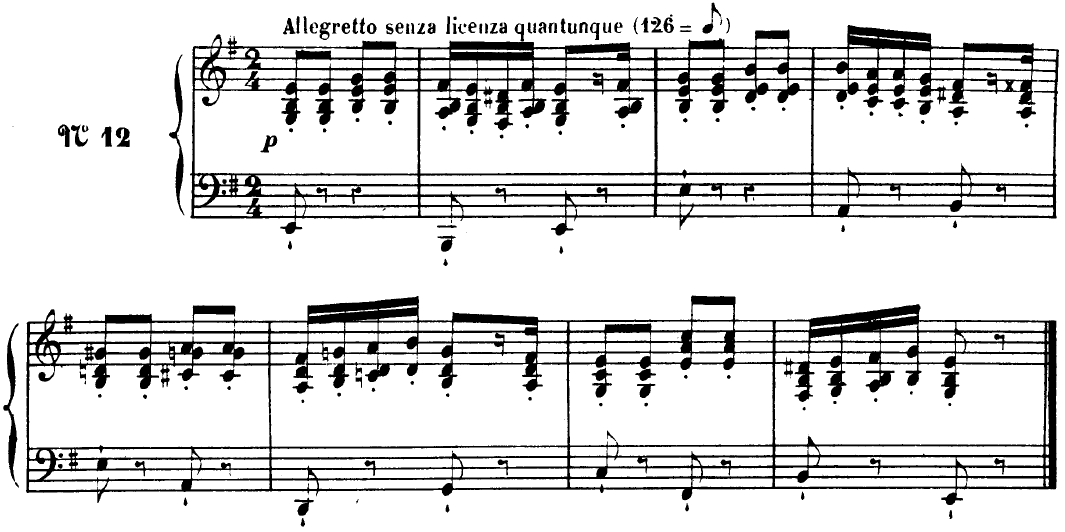
Theme

Marked piano, the eight-bar theme is stated in the treble by three-note chords, played staccato. The bass is sparse, marked staccatissimo.

Variation I

The bass, still marked staccatissimo, takes on the melody while the treble continues playing three note chords (also staccatissimo) in a supplementary fashion. The first four bars are marked forte, followed by a diminuendo passage where the treble figuration descends to piano, before a forte finish in the last bar.

Variation II

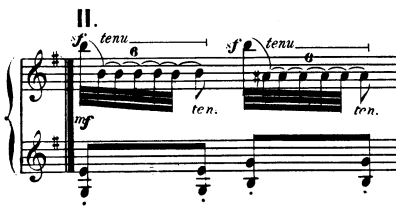
The unusual right-hand notation

The bass continues to take on the melody, this time in sixths, marked staccato. The treble meanwhile plays an unusually notated figure – thirty-second sextuplet octave jumps where the first note is marked sforzando, while the rest of the notes are tied and marked tenuto. Thirty-second note flourishes are marked forte.

Variation III

Another staccato variation. The harmonisation is unusual – every chord in the melody is 'held back' by a B♭ and C, while the bass (playing in the treble) jumps about. Pauses in the melody are greeted by staccato 'growling' in the deep bass.

Variation IV

Marked con duolo ("with grief"). The melody is simplified to two-in-a-bar chords marked dolce e legato. The staccato 'growling' in the bass continues however.

Variation V

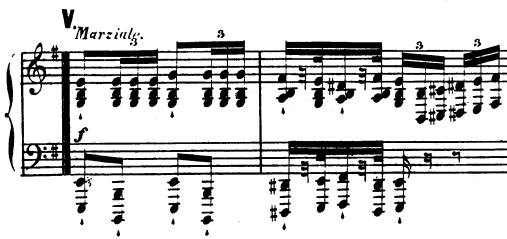
The first of two march variations

A march in octaves. Triplet sixteenth octaves in both hands provide momentum while the harmony modulates through E melodic minor and F melodic minor. An ascending scale in octaves modulates to F major, before modulating back to E minor to finish the variation.

Variation VI

Continues the march in the bright key of C major, marked piano. A 2 1/2-bar-long trill and smaller chords make the variation contrast to the preceding one. However, this is broken by a return of the forte octave passages from the previous variation, modulating between C major, B major and B minor, before finishing in the original key of E minor.

Variation VII

The bass takes on the melody with wide, rolled chords, while the treble engages itself with undulating sextuplet thirty-second scale runs. Again, it modulates through the melodic minor, while sevenths and ninths add colour to the harmony. The scale flourish in the last bar is the first moment in the piece where Alkan notates use of a pedal.

Variation VIII

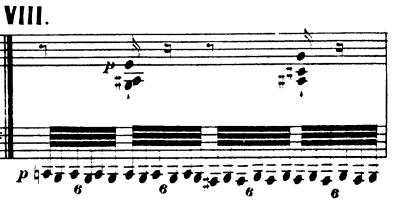
The first measure of the eighth variation

A quiet trill in the bass, starting on C_{2} and B_{1}, provides background tension while the melody, syncopated by a sixteenth beat, hops about the treble uncertainly. The penultimate bar is marked pochissimo [slight] cresc[endo].

Variation IX

This variation is in the tonic major (MAGGIORE). It is more legato than the previous variation, marked “dolce e sostenuto” (sweetly and sustained).

Variation X

This is embellished by a tinkling ostinato in the high register, marked scampanatino ("like bells").

Variation XI

The ostinato, now in thirds, becomes the main treble figure, marked molto legato. The ostinato switches to sixteenth sextuplets by the fifth bar. The melody returns to the bass for the first time since Variation VII, marked quasi corni ("almost like horns"). The last four bars consist of triplet and sextuplet tremoli in sixths and sevenths.

Variation XII

Concludes the first Maggiore variations as the undulating sextuplets move to the bass and the melody moves to the lower treble. The bass plays very wide broken chords (requiring a supple wrist to play) and arpeggios that end unexpectedly in the next variation.

Variation XIII

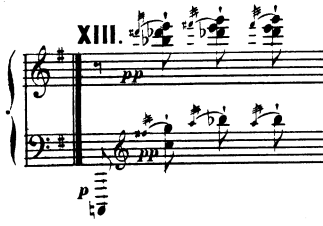
First measure of the thirteenth variation

A single note in the deep bass ends the previous variation, followed by bounces in the upper registers. Each chord in the upper register melody is preceded by an extremely short acciaccatura.

Variation XIV

This variation is marked forte, trombata ("trumpets"), with staccato sixteenth triplets and mordents, combined with frequent overlapping of the hands.

Variation XV

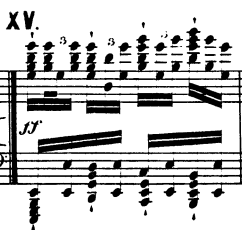
The second trumpet-like variation

A continuation of the last variation, with the melody in chords and octaves marked fortissimo and staccatissimo. The left hand switches back to normal sixteenth notes, with loud and expansive chords that modulate briefly to D minor and C minor before ending dramatically in E minor.

Variation XVI

Directly following the climax of the first half of the piece, the 16th variation juxtaposes the previous variation, and is marked piano, e preghevole ("soft, and prayer-like"). It fades into pianissimo.

Variation XVII

Treble sixty-fourth notes move through the bare chords of the initial theme, with rising sequences, falling diminished seventh arpeggios and chromatic scales, while the bass remains staccato and pianissimo while playing an Alberti bass.

Variation XVIII

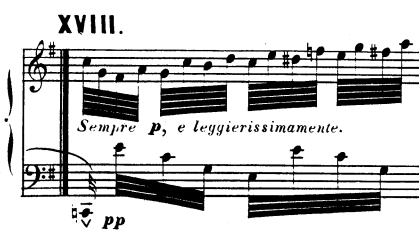
The second of two rapid and light variations

After a chromatic descent, the sixty-fourth note runs continue, now in the key of C major. The bass doubles in speed (thirty-second notes), while playing large jumps, frequent staccatissimo notes and wide arpeggios. The variation is marked sempre piano, e leggierissimamente ("always soft, and as light as can be") throughout.

Variation XIX

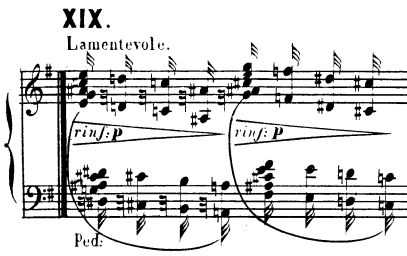
The nineteenth variation

Labelled Lamentevole ("lamentable"), the melody is set against the dissonance of rinforzando octaves. Left and right hands share a chromatic descent of octaves following the melody note every half bar, each starting rinforzando and ending piano. The variation is formed by accenting diminished chords between both hands whilst juxtaposing a descending chromatic figure. Alkan's specification to hold the pedal down for the entirety of the variation emphasizes its dissonant nature.

Variation XX

Labelled Impavidè ("fearless"), this variation consists of thirty-second notes stamps of thick chords marked fortississimo (fff) each. It is marked Senz'arpeggiare alcunamente ("without any chord rolling"), though there are a few instances of acciaccaturae colouring.

Variation XXI

A return to the tonic major (Maggiore), this variation is marked by a triplet sixteenth rendering of the melody to be played staccato. This variation is labeled Caccia.

Variation XXII

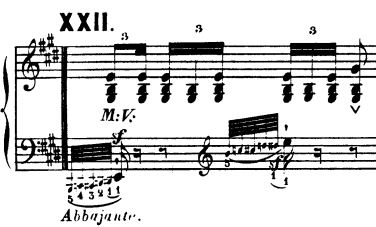
The 'barking' twenty-second variation

This variation combines the melody treatment in the previous variation with the acciaccatura ornamentation of XX, which is marked abbajante ("barking"). The melody is juxtaposed with dog barks in both the bass and the treble. This is the first time in the piece that an explicit reference to the animals is made.

Variation XXIII

A return to the minor key, as both hands move to the bass. Marked tempestoso ("tempestuous"), it consists of one long thirty-second note dodecuplet tremolo in both hands, with brief chromatic pauses, making only sparse references to the theme. The pedal is required throughout.

Variation XXIV

A development of the tempestoso theme, the tremolo figure is similar to that in the middle section of the L'enfer movement in Alkan's Grand Duo Concertante. The melody is developed in the first four bars, while the last bars consist of large rising and falling chromatic scales in the right hand that climax in the last variation. Meanwhile, the bass tremolo is punctuated by fortissimo octave statements in the lower bass.

Variation XXV

The last variation, extended beyond the eight-bar format of the previous variations, features an octave rendering of the theme. The molto cresc. in the previous variation culminates in a trionfalmente, fortississimo (triumphantly, very very loud).

The next eight bars consist of a different melodic treatment of the theme, with elements of a canon as both hands take turns stating the melody. The first four bars are to be played sempre fortississimo, with the latter half dropping to mezzo-forte. A crescendo leads to a final eight-bar Maggiore statement of the initial trionfalmente variation, featuring the same rhythmic scheme. A final triplet flourish (fortississimo) finishes the first section of the variation.

This is immediately succeeded by a simple four-bar interlude to be played pianissimo. Polyphonically, the truncated theme is stated in the staccato bass and the sostenuto treble. The next eight bars (piano, sostenuto) develops the polyphony further, building tension (cresc. poco a poco) as the voices become broader and broader. This culminates in a sequence of arpeggiated sixteenth note chords in both hands, to be played fortissimo and staccatissimo.

Coda

After this sequence, another eight-bar interlude in the bass, irregularly grouped, follows, making only oblique references to the theme. This is followed by a section of 11 bars' length, consisting of wide chords rising and falling. This culminates in a final explosion of chords that starts in A minor, modulates to G major and finally E minor, with brief references to E major. It is to be played fortissimo sempre crescendo to a fortississimo, whereby afterwards a dim. molto and a thinning of the chords escorts the piece to a conclusion. A final octave statement of the theme in the bass, harmonized in the right hand by murmuring chords, leads the piece to a seemingly quiet denouement, where a final fortississimo stamp signifies its proper finish.

== Reception ==
Kaikhosru Shapurji Sorabji wrote of this piece that it was

worthy of a place beside the Diabelli Variations of Beethoven, the Paganini Variations of Brahms, and the Bach Variations of Reger. Full of astonishing harmonic quirks and twists, supremely masterly and ingenious treatment and a pianistic lay-out worthy of the composer himself – all informed with that verve and vitality, that delightful, eerie, bizarre, and somewhat eldritch quality that make this master’s work so irresistible and fascinating to the sympathetic student.

== Recordings ==
The piece has been recorded, among others, by Raymond Lewenthal, Stephanie McCallum, Ronald Smith, Bernard Ringeissen, Alan Weiss, Vincenzo Maltempo, Igor Roma, Léda Massoura, Satu Paavola, Yui Morishita, Michael Ponti, Joseph Bloch, Fred Dokan, Jack Gibbons, Marc-André Hamelin, Bruce Liu, Yeol Eum Son and Tiffany Poon.
