= Trois Grandes Études =

Set of three piano études composed by Charles-Valentin Alkan in 1838

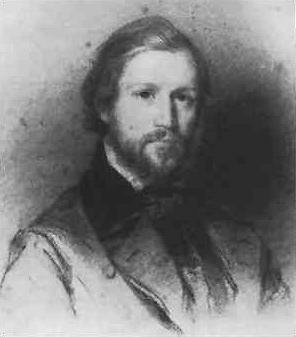
Charles-Valentin Alkan, c. 1835

The Trois Grandes Études (Three Grand Études), Op. 76, are a set of three piano études composed by Charles-Valentin Alkan in 1838 and published in 1839. Although they have the highest opus number of any Alkan work, the études were actually composed when he was only 25. Featuring some of his most difficult writing, the first two études are for left hand only and right hand only, respectively. The third requires both hands to play in unison, two octaves apart.

== Études ==
=== No. 1 ===
The first étude, Fantaisie, in A♭ major, is for the left hand only. It features tremolos, numerous dense sequences of chords, and large jumps.

The first known performance was by Ferruccio Busoni in Berlin in 1908. A typical performance lasts 9 minutes.

=== No. 2 ===
The second étude, Introduction, Variations et Finale, in D major, is for the right hand only. The longest and most difficult of the three, it features rapid cadenza-like flourishes along with many of the same technical challenges found in the first étude.

The first public performance is not known. A typical performance lasts 15–25 minutes.

=== No. 3 ===
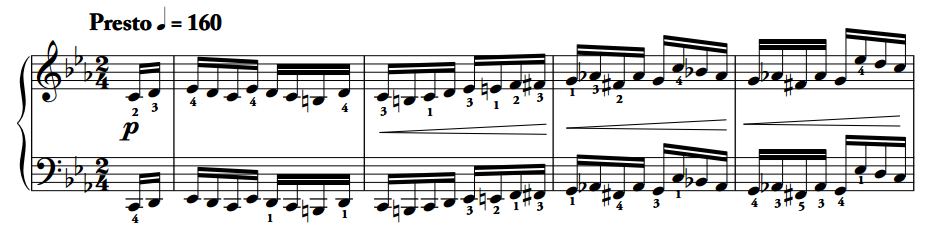

The third and final étude, Mouvement semblable et perpétuel, in C minor, for both hands together, is quite different from the previous two études. It consists of a continuous stream of sixteenth notes duplicated two octaves apart.

A typical performance lasts 5 minutes. Also referred to as 'Rondo-Toccata'.

== Recordings ==
Recordings of the Trois Grandes Études have been made by Stephanie McCallum (1985), Ronald Smith (1987), Laurent Martin (1993), Marc-André Hamelin (1994), Albert Frantz (2012), and Alessandro Deljavan (2013). The third étude was also recorded by Bogdan Czapiewski in 1983 and by Vincenzo Maltempo in 2012.
