= Stephanie McCallum =

- Born: March 3, 1956 (age 69); Sydney, Australia
- Occupation(s): Classical pianist, academic
- Spouse: Peter McCallum
- Website: stephaniemccallum.com

Stephanie McCallum (born 3 March 1956) is an Australian classical pianist. She has recorded works of Erik Satie, Ludwig van Beethoven, Charles-Valentin Alkan, Franz Liszt, Robert Schumann, Carl Maria von Weber, Albéric Magnard, Pierre Boulez, and Iannis Xenakis among others.

== Life ==
McCallum was born in Sydney in 1956. She studied with Alexander Sverjensky and Gordon Watson at the Sydney Conservatorium of Music. After further study with Ronald Smith in the UK, she gave her debut concert at Wigmore Hall in 1982. Returning to Australia in 1985, she became a founding member of contemporary ensembles austraLYSIS (with Roger Dean) and the Sydney Alpha Ensemble. She has performed as soloist with most of the major Australian symphony orchestras and in ensembles such as the Australian Chamber Orchestra, ELISION Ensemble and the Australia Ensemble. In a 1985 Wigmore Hall recital, she gave what is believed to be the first complete public performance of Alkan's Trois grandes études, Op. 76 (for the left hand, for the right hand, and for both). In 2000, she gave the world premiere of Elena Kats-Chernin's first piano concerto Displaced Dances (which was written for her) with the Queensland Symphony Orchestra and has subsequently performed this work with the Adelaide and Sydney Symphony orchestras. As well as performing and recording, she continues teaching at the Sydney Conservatorium of Music as associate professor in piano. McCallum is the president of the Alkan Society, a UK-based society founded by Smith dedicated to the study and appreciation of Alkan and his works.

== Repertoire and recordings ==
McCallum has released 18 solo CDs, and her recordings of the music of Liszt and her CDs of French piano music have recently been re-released as boxed sets. Her recording of all of Beethoven's bagatelles for piano contains the published sets of Bagatelles, Opp. 33, 119 and 126, Bagatelle No. 25, WoO 59 ("Für Elise"), and also the first recording of what is believed to be the last piano piece that Beethoven wrote, never before published or even catalogued (the piece was edited by Stephanie's husband, the musicologist Peter McCallum). She has specialized in virtuosic nineteenth-century music, particularly of Alkan and of contemporary solo and ensemble music. She made the first recording of Alkan's Studies in all the Major Keys, Op. 35, and subsequently recorded Alkan's Studies in all the Minor Keys, Op. 39, being the first pianist to record both sets. In 2013, during the centenary of Alkan's birth, she released recordings of all five Books of Alkan's Chants, along with other previously unrecorded music by this composer. Her performances of Xenakis's Herma, and Brian Ferneyhough's Lemma Icon Epigram have received critical acclaim. She has released CDs of the music of Liszt, Weber, Alkan, Schumann, Magnard, Pierre Boulez, Xenakis and of contemporary Australian composers. In addition to Alkan and Boulez, she has recorded much other music by French composers: Satie, Magnard, Vincent d'Indy, Maurice Ravel and Guy Ropartz. McCallum records on a number of period pianos by Anton Walter and Sébastien Érard.

Her solo CDs include:

- Alkan, Concerto for Solo Piano (from Op. 39), 'Chants', Op. 70 [first recording] (1990)
- Alkan, Twelve Studies in the Major Keys, Op. 35, Tall Poppies (1994)
- Notations, Tall Poppies (1994)
- Alkan & Magnard, Tall Poppies (1996)
- Illegal Harmonies: The Twentieth Century Piano, ABC Classics (1997)
- Carl Maria von Weber: The Complete Piano Sonatas and Other Works, [2 CDs] ABC Classics (1998)
- Perfume: The Exquisite Piano Music of France, ABC Classics (2001) – Australia No. 25;
- The Liszt Album, ABC Classics (2003) (including the B minor Sonata)
- Liszt: From the 'Years of Pilgrimage', ABC Classics (2003)
- Alkan: Douze Études dans les tons mineurs [Twelve Studies in the Minor Keys], Op. 39 (including Symphonie, Concerto and Overture for solo piano, and Le festin d'Ésope), [2 CDs] ABC Classics (2006)
- Gymnopédies: The Exquisite Piano Music of Erik Satie, ABC Classics (2007)
- Für Elise. Bagatelles for piano by Ludwig van Beethoven, ABC Classics (2008)
- Scenes from Childhood. Piano music of Robert Schumann, ABC Classics (2010)
- Alkan, Complete 'Recueils de Chants' Volume One, Toccata Classics (2013)
- Alkan, Complete 'Recueils de Chants' Volume Two, including Deux nocturnes, Op. 57; Deux petites pièces, Op. 60: Ma chère liberté, Ma chère servitude; Désir; Fantaisie; Chapeau bas!; Seconda fantasticheria, Toccata Classics (2013)
- Guy Ropartz: Piano Music, Toccata Classics (2016)
- Le Prophète: Music for Four Hands, with Erin Helyard, TRPTK (2017)
- Alexandre Boëly: Piano Music, Volume One, Toccata Classics (2018)
- Roy Agnew: Piano Music, Toccata Classics (2019)

== Awards and nominations ==
=== ARIA Music Awards ===
The ARIA Music Awards is an annual awards ceremony that recognises excellence, innovation, and achievement across all genres of Australian music. They commenced in 1987.

Year	Nominee / work	Award	Result	Ref.
2001	Perfume	Best Classical Album	Nominated	
