= Trois Morceaux dans le genre pathétique =

Piano suite by Alkan (1837)

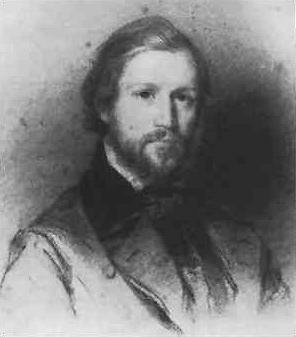
Charles-Valentin Alkan, c. 1835

Trois Morceaux dans le genre pathétique (Three Pieces in the Pathetic Style), Op. 15, is a three-movement suite for piano composed by the French composer, Charles-Valentin Alkan, published in 1837. The suite also bears the title Souvenirs (Memories). The three movements are Aime-moi (Love Me), Le Vent (The Wind), and Morte (Dead Woman).

== Description ==
=== 1. Aime-moi ===
Aime-moi, in A♭ minor, features repeated chords, tremolos, and arpeggios. The first theme is similar of that to Chopin's style. Between the beginning of the piece and the climax in the middle, the subdivision of the beat gradually increases. It starts with eighth notes, changes to triplets, and then sixteenth notes, and then five notes per beat, etc. until it climaxes with thirty-second notes (eight per beat). After this climax, the main theme recapitulates, but is soon succeeded by a more intense melody in octaves along with triplet sixteenth notes in the left hand (six notes per beat). The key then changes from A♭ minor to A♭ major, and the piece goes into a long and winding section of free-flowing sixteenth notes alternating by groups of two in the right and left hand. The sixteenth notes flow into the high register and a small falling and rising arpeggio seemingly concludes the piece. However, Alkan adds one more small flourish before finally ending in A♭ major.

=== 2. Le vent ===
Le Vent is in B minor. The piece is in three sections, roughly in ABA' form. The outer sections contain chromatic scales throughout, like the impromptu, and the middle section contrasts with arpeggios accompanying the melody instead of chromatic scales. These chromatic scales include a 2 page transition, completely composed of dual chromatic scales sweeping the span of most of the keyboard. The first theme clearly represents the wind, with sad extended chords superimposed by languid chromatics. The second theme is in D major (the relative key to B minor), and features sweeps for the left hand while the right performs the melody in octaves (quoting the Allegretto of Beethoven's Seventh Symphony) with tremolos played within. Then the first theme returns fiercely with tremolos instead of chords for the left hand. Surprisingly, after chilling chromatic scales deep in the bass register, the piece ends with one final light ascending chromatic scale and a B major chord.

Kaikhosru Shapurji Sorabji wrote of this piece in 1932 that it was

familiar ... — too familiar one is tempted to say, for most people think of Alkan, indeed only know him, as the composer of ‘Le Vent’, as they know only the Sibelius of the ‘Valse Triste’ or ‘Finlandia’; the great master of ‘Le festin d'Ésope’ and the Fourth Symphony respectively being completely a terra incognita.

=== 3. Morte ===
Morte, in E♭ minor, quotes the Gregorian chant of Dies Irae. The piece is the longest of the three, and features difficult, dense chord passages, sixths, trills, tremolos and repeated notes. In part of the piece, there is a constant tolling of a B♭ in a very similar way as Ravel's "Le Gibet" from Gaspard de la nuit, composed over 70 years later. Near the end, there is a very passionate and intense buildup that leads to quick short chords similar to the final part of Chopin's Ballade No. 4 in F minor right before the coda. The piece ends by quoting the "Aime-moi" theme, some chromatic scales very similar to those in "Le vent" and finally concludes very abruptly with a long trill and two short 16th note chords.

Sorabji considered this

the most remarkable number of the set ... a moving and tragic elegy or dirge ... full of astonishing hardiesses, both technical, pianistic and harmonic, and its ending is as weirdly uncanny as it is original and daring.

== Reception ==
The pieces received a virulent review from Robert Schumann, who wrote:

It has a considerable flavour of Sue and Sand. One is startled by such false, unnatural art ... We always make allowances for erring talent ... but when nothing is to be found but black on black, we turn away in discouragement

Franz Liszt, to whom this set was dedicated, received them much more warmly than Schumann did, saying that they were "read and re-read many a time since the day when they brought me such great joy. These are compositions which could not be more distinguished and, all friendly prejudice aside, are likely to excite the deep interest of musicians."

== Recordings ==
Recordings of the Trois Morceaux have been made by Robert Rivard, Marc-André Hamelin, Yui Morishita, and Vincenzo Maltempo. A recording of Le Vent from a piano roll made by Harold Bauer also exists.
