= Sydney Alpha Ensemble =

Sydney Alpha Ensemble is an Australian contemporary music ensemble.

In October 1996 and February 1997 they, along with Georges Lentz and Stephanie McCallum, recorded a series of compositions by Elena Kats-Chernin. The recordings, conducted by David Stanhope, were released as an album, Clocks in 1997 by ABC Classics. It received a nomination at the 1998 ARIA Music Awards for Best Classical Album.

== Discography ==
- Elena Kats-Chernin: Clocks (1997) – ABC Classics (456 468–2)
- Strange Attractions (1997) – ABC Classics (456 537–2)
- Silbury Air music by Birtwistle, Banks, Stockhausen, Butterley and Dallapiccola (2000) – ABC Classics (465 651–2)

The Contemporary Singers and the Sydney Alpha Ensemble:

- Raffaele Marcellino: Heart of Fire (2000) – ABC Classics
