= Piano symphony =

A piano symphony is a piece for solo piano in one or more movements. It is a symphonic genre by virtue of imitating orchestral tone colour, texture, and symphonic development.

== History ==
An early piano symphony was written by Theodor Kullak and published in 1847. French composer Charles-Valentin Alkan composed one, which was published in 1857. José Vianna da Motta wrote of it, "Alkan demonstrates his brilliant understanding of [symphonic] form in the first movement of the Symphony (the fourth Study [of his Op. 39]). ... The tonalities are so carefully calculated and developed that anyone listening to it can relate each note to an orchestral sound; and yet it is not just through the sonority that the orchestra is painted and becomes tangible, but equally through the style and the way that the polyphony is handled."

Several decades later, Kaikhosru Shapurji Sorabji wrote his Third Piano Sonata (1922), which he described as a piano symphony. Between the years 1938–1976, Sorabji wrote 6 piano symphonies. Among these is also sometimes included his Piano Symphony No. 0 (1930–1931), which is the complete piano part of his otherwise unfinished 2nd Symphony for Orchestra.

Niels Viggo Bentzon described his Partita for Piano, Op. 38 (1945), as a "symphony for solo piano".

The composer John White's Piano Sonatina No. 8 (1961) consists of six movements, of which the fifth is called "Symphony in Five Movements".

Haskel Small has also composed a piano symphony.

== See also ==
- Organ symphony
- Concerto for solo piano
- Beethoven Symphonies (Liszt)
