= Concerto for Solo Piano (Alkan) =

Piano piece written by Charles-Valentin Alkan

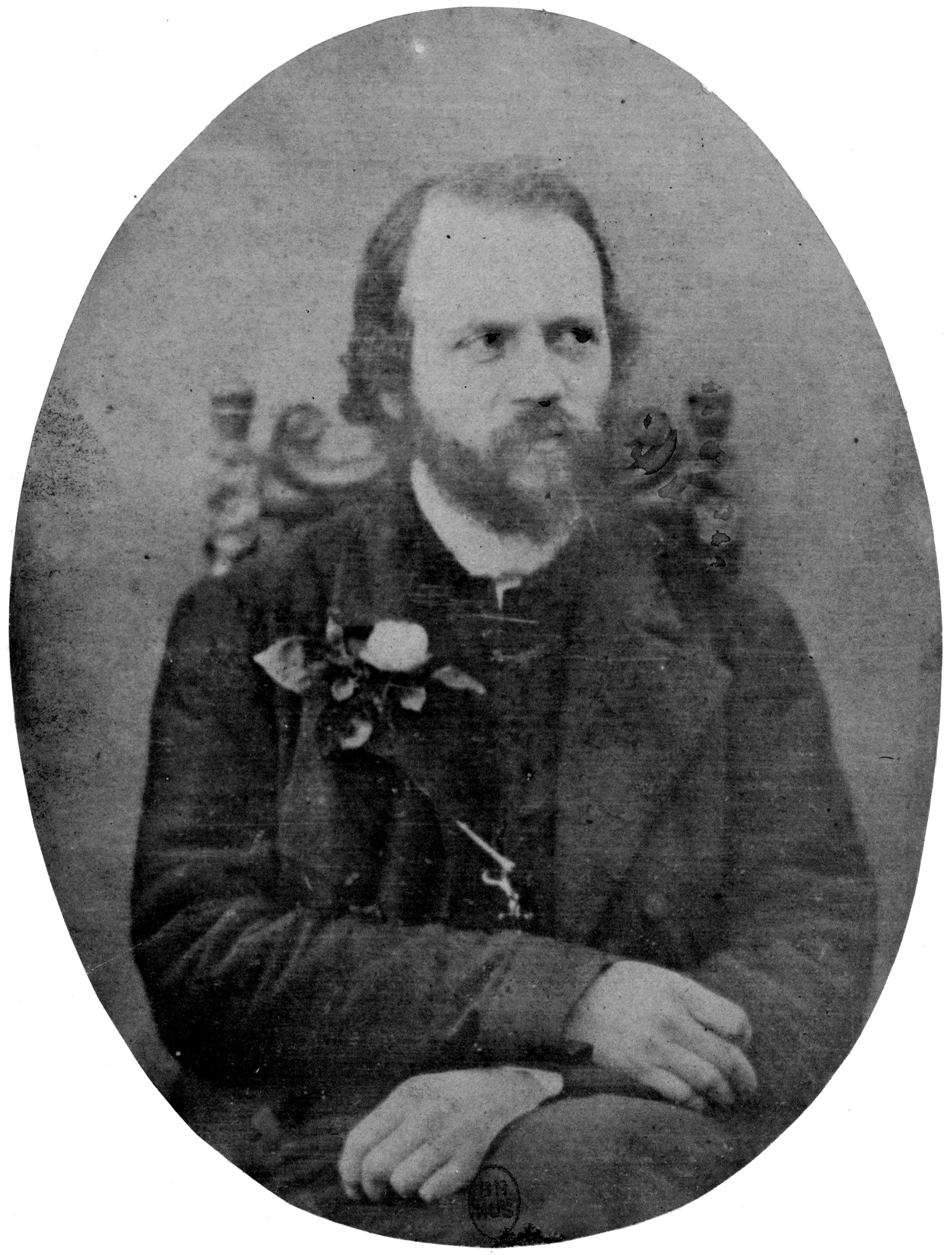
Charles-Valentin Alkan

Concerto for Solo Piano (French: Concerto pour piano seul) is a 3-movement solo piano piece written by Charles-Valentin Alkan. The pieces are part of a 12 piece cycle entitled Douze études dans tous les tons mineurs (12 Studies in the Minor Keys), published in 1857 (although it may have been written some years earlier). With sections marked "Tutti", "Solo" and "Piano", the piece requires the soloist to present the voices of both the orchestra and the soloist. The pianist Jack Gibbons comments: "The style and form of the music take on a monumental quality—rich, thickly set textures and harmonies ... conjure up the sound world of a whole orchestra and tax the performer, both physically and mentally, to the limit."

The work features progressive tonality, beginning in G♯ minor and ending in F♯ minor; this is a consequence of the piece being three consecutive elements of the cycle of 12 études, each of which is in a key a perfect fourth higher than its predecessor.

The piece, including all 3 movements, is 121 pages long and takes about 50 minutes to perform. The first movement on its own comprises 72 pages and takes over 29 minutes to play (Jack Gibbons comments that "the first movement has more bars in it than the entire Hammerklavier Sonata by Beethoven"). Alkan authorized the piece to be truncated to make "un morceau de concert, d'une durée ordinaire" (a concert piece of normal duration). It may be that the composer himself performed the first movement (alone) in such a shortened version in a recital in Paris in the 1880s. It was not until in 1939 that Egon Petri gave the piece a proper performance, in its entirety, during BBC broadcasts.

Adrian Corleonis considers the Concerto to represent the most cruelly taxing piano work before the time of Kaikhosru Shapurji Sorabji and Ferruccio Busoni.

== Description ==
=== I. Allegro assai ===
The first movement, which requires almost half an hour to play and has 1342 bars, is marked "Allegro assai". Performance demands tremendous physical endurance, and great technical skills to cover features including arpeggios, octave runs, scales, leaps, grace notes, alternating hands, swiftly changing block chord motifs, tremolos, and trills executed by the fourth and fifth fingers with the melody played on the same hand. Alkan stays close to the classical sonata form, using a double exposition, but the exposition and development sections are expanded greatly.

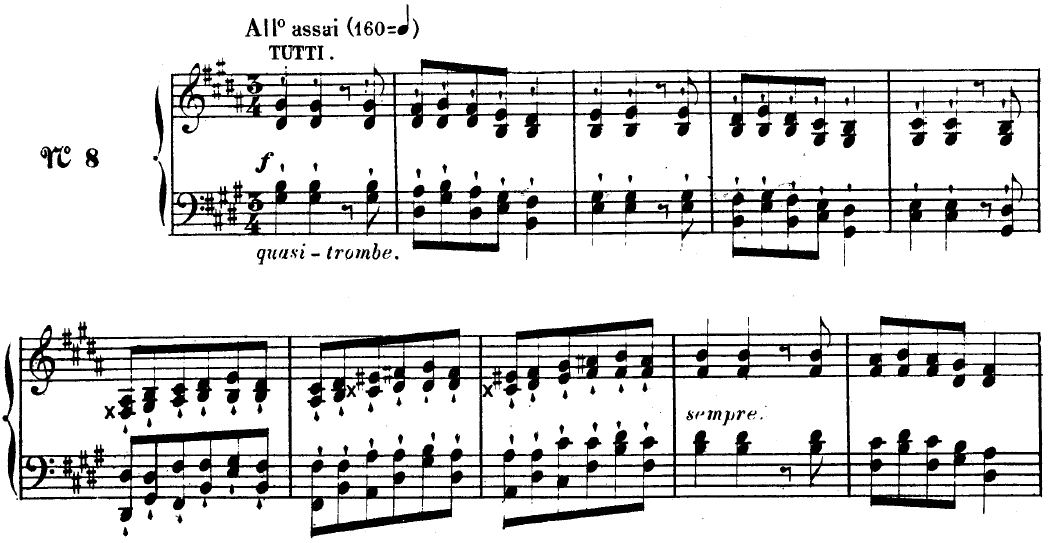

The opening bars, constituting the first theme, are marked "quasi-trombe" (like trumpets). Such markings appear frequently throughout the score to indicate the orchestral instrument the pianist is supposed to evoke. After this theme is exposed, the contrasting, more lyrical second theme begins. This second theme is used as a contrast to both the first theme itself and, more generally, any difficult virtuosic passages.

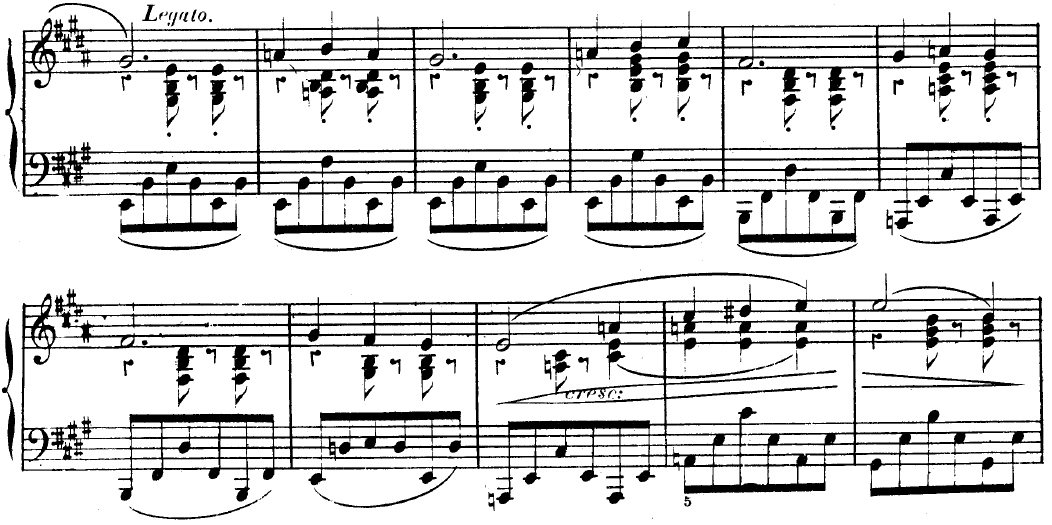

A third theme, more heroic in nature and in the major key, enters after some development of the first two themes. The 'solo' entry following discussion of these themes is of a Chopinesque, quasi-improvisatory nature. A notable feature of the movement is the very extended passage on a constant 'pedal' note of G♯, preceding the recapitulation section.

=== II. Adagio ===
The second movement is "a profoundly moving and expressive Adagio that builds to a powerful funeral central section presaging the sound-world of Mahler", says Stewart. The movement is marked "Adagio" and introductory section is marked "quasi-celli".

=== III. Allegretto alla barbaresca ===
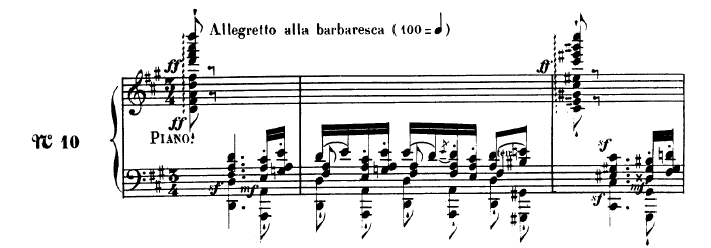
The opening bars of the 3rd movement

The final movement marked "Allegretto alla barbaresca" features technical difficulties comparable with those of the first movement, including larger leaps and a more pervasive use of 3-against-4 polyrhythms. One passage contains the unique marking 'quasi-ribeche', i.e. like rebecs, a medieval stringed instrument derived from the Arabic rebab.

== Orchestration ==
The first movement of the Concerto was orchestrated by Karl Klindworth. A first version was made in 1872 (the ms. is now in the library of the Royal College of Music in London), and was apparently submitted to Alkan himself shortly before the latter's death, having already been approved by Hans von Bülow. Klindworth produced a second version, which was performed in Berlin in 1902 with Klindworth conducting, the soloist being José Vianna da Motta, to whom this version was dedicated. The orchestrated version takes considerable liberties with the original, with many passages extended, truncated or altered. Other attempts at orchestrating the Concerto were made by Alkan's possible son Élie-Miriam Delaborde and by the American composer Mark Starr. A recording of Klindworth's 1902 version was issued in 1997 by Naxos Records with Dmitry Feofanov as soloist. (Note: Naxos 8.553702)

== Discography ==
There are now a number of recordings of the work; notable ones include those by Jack Gibbons, Marc-André Hamelin, John Ogdon, Mark Latimer, Ronald Smith, Stephanie McCallum, Vincenzo Maltempo, Paul Wee and Stéphanie Elbaz.
