= Comme le vent =

Piano composition by Charles-Valentin Alkan

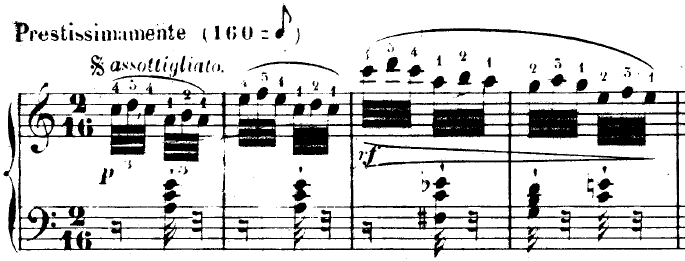
The beginning of the work's score, with its unusual tempo and time signature

Comme le vent (Like the wind) is the first of the Études in the minor keys, Op. 39 for solo piano by the French composer Charles-Valentin Alkan. It is in A minor. The tempo marking is prestissimamente ( = 160), and the unusual 2/16 time signature further encourages a fast performance. Its continuous triplet melody evokes a tarantella, and has a fleeting Mendelssohnian scherzo character, but is marked by Alkan's obsessive melodic development and unusual harmonic progressions.

The piece is technically demanding, requiring extreme digital velocity and dexterity, as well as stamina: lasting less than four minutes if played at tempo, its 23 pages contain long passages of perpetual triplet-32nd notes (triplet demisemiquavers) for the right hand. At the notated metronome marking, this corresponds to 16 notes per second throughout much of the piece, and in one section containing 64th notes, more than 21 notes per second. This speed is near to or beyond the physical limits of most pianists.

The piece is not to be confused with Alkan's earlier Le vent, one of the Trois morceaux op. 15. Kaikhosru Shapurji Sorabji considered the earlier piece to be better, making the later piece 'rather anticlimactic and redundant.'

The piece was in the repertoire of Sergei Rachmaninoff in the 1919/1920 concert season.
