= Grande Sonate 'Les Quatre Âges' =

1847 piano sonata by Charles-Valentin Alkan

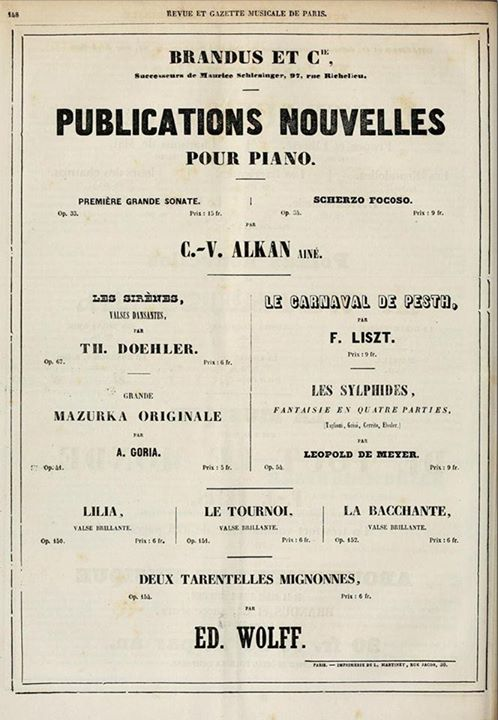
Announcement of the publication of Alkan's Grande sonate (Op. 33) and Scherzo focoso (Op. 34) by Brandus et Cie on 7 May 1848 in the Revue et gazette musicale de Paris

Grande Sonate: Les Quatre Âges (French for Grand sonata: The Four Ages), Op. 33, is a four-movement piano sonata by Charles-Valentin Alkan. The sonata's title refers to the subtitles given to each movement, portraying a man at the ages of 20, 30, 40, and 50. The work was published in 1847, dedicated to the composer's father, Alkan Morhange (who died eight years later, in 1855).

The sequence of movements is unlike the typical classical piano sonata, in that they become progressively slower; after the lively 20 Ans (years), marked 'très vite' (very fast) and the complex 30 Ans, subtitled Quasi-Faust, and marked 'assez vite' (quite fast), 40 Ans is more sedate, marked 'lentement' (slowly), and 50 Ans, dark and pessimistic in mood, is marked 'extrêmement lent' (extremely slow).

== Structure ==
=== 20 Ans ===
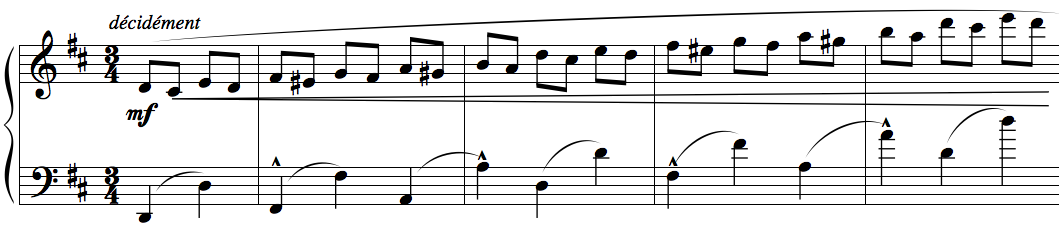
The sonata begins with the optimistic 20 Ans, played very quickly and lively.

The sonata opens with 20 Ans, a quickly played piece based in D major but also with many passages in the relative minor key of B minor. The young man's 'clumsiness' is marked for example by sudden 'wrong chords' – one in B♭ major is marked 'ridente' (Italian: laughing). The key, tempo and ternary form of this movement are similar to Frédéric Chopin's Scherzo No. 1, Op. 20. The sonata thus marks itself from the start as different from any previous sonatas, by beginning effectively with a scherzo. The movement, opening in D major, later changes into B minor after a slow, melodic section in B major, and ends with a B major flourish.

=== 30 Ans: Quasi-Faust ===
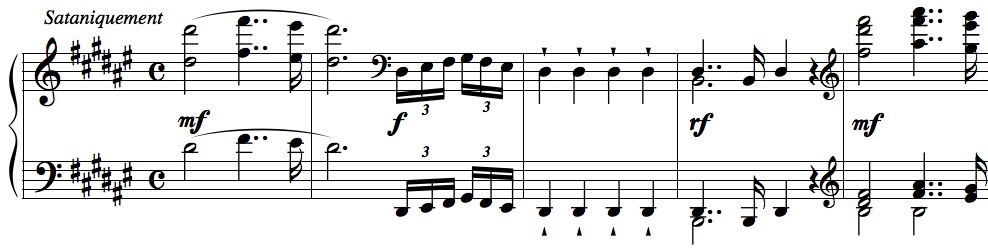
30 Ans, also known as "Quasi-Faust", the second movement, begins with a fanfare to be played "satanically".

The second movement, in D♯ minor (i.e. a key a semitone above the first movement) and ending in the relative major key of F♯ major, called 30 Ans and subtitled "Quasi-Faust", is the most substantial piece in the sonata, in sonata form. Ronald Smith comments on the first subject of this movement:

The duality of this subject, like the dual nature of man, anticipates by six years a similar duality in the Liszt Sonata in which threatening repeated notes are also a feature of the answering phrase.

However, Smith also points out that whilst Liszt treats his material rhapsodically, Alkan keeps to the classical form, if not proportions. The movement contains much of the most difficult parts in the entire sonata like extremely rapid chords and octaves, huge leaps in both hands and other passage works. Amid the movement, there is a brief eight-voice fugue.

Raymond Lewenthal wrote regarding this movement: "[it] is actually a tone poem within a tone poem ... it forms the apex of the sonata and it is the longest and most difficult movement. It stands very well by itself and no one performing it without the other movements need fear being criticised for serving up a bleeding chunk."

=== 40 Ans: Un heureux ménage ===
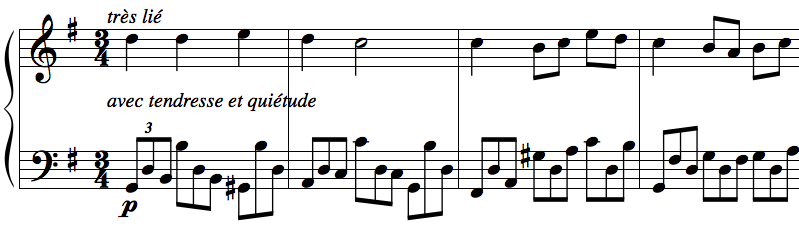
The third movement depicts "a happy household" with sections devoted to "the children" and "praying".

40 Ans, titled "Un heureux ménage" (A Happy Household), illustrates family life for the aging man, with sections that represent "the children" and "a prayer". The movement is in the 'simple' key of G major.

=== 50 Ans: Prométhée enchaîné ===
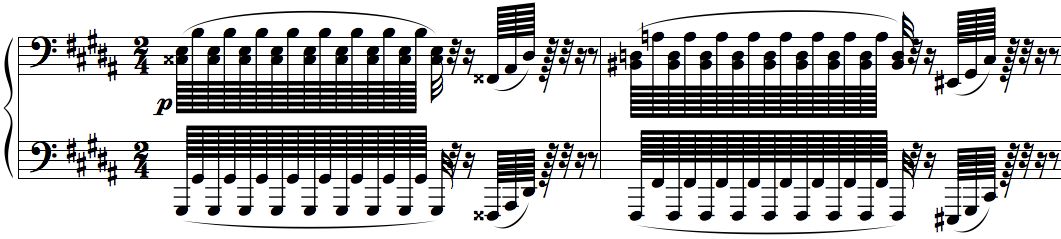
50 Ans, the final movement, is subtitled "Prometheus Bound" and is very dark and intense.

The sonata ends with 50 Ans, called "Prométhée enchaîné" (Prometheus Bound), which gravely depicts the man looking toward death. This movement, in G♯ minor, has the same tonal relationship to the third movement as the second has to the first. Contrary to classical traditions, however, the key in which the sonata ends is very distant from that in which it begins.

== Relationship to the Liszt Sonata ==
The originality of this work, together with some structural similarities such as those referred to above, have led writers such as Ronald Smith, Kenneth Hamilton and Jack Gibbons to surmise that Liszt may have known this work before writing his own Sonata in B minor. However, there is no evidence that Liszt (or Alkan himself, for that matter) ever played the 'Grande sonate' in public or private, although the two pianists certainly knew each other in Paris and were aware of each other's work. However, the publication of the 'Grande Sonate' was unfortunate in its timing; in early 1848 the revolution emptied the capital of musical life, and Alkan's failure to obtain a professorship at the Paris Conservatoire later in the year led to his withdrawal from the concert scene. Liszt also left Paris for Weimar. For these reasons, consideration of Alkan's influence on Liszt's Sonata must remain speculative.

== In popular culture ==
The sonata plays a part in the plot of The Forgotten Room, a 2015 novel by Lincoln Child. It is also mentioned briefly in Book of the Dead (2007) by Douglas Preston and Lincoln Child.

== Notes ==
=== References ===
- Alkan, Charles-Valentin (2002). Grande Sonate for solo piano. Boca Raton, Florida: Masters Music Publications.
- Smith, Ronald, Alkan:The Music, London, 2000.
