= Raymond Lewenthal =

American musician (1923–1988)

Raymond Lewenthal (August 29, 1923 – November 21, 1988) was an American virtuoso pianist. Among his teachers were Olga Samaroff, who was a pupil of Charles-Valentin Alkan's son, Élie-Miriam Delaborde.

== Biography ==
Lewenthal was born in San Antonio, Texas to Russian-French parents of Jewish origin. His birth date is often given as 1926, but he was actually born three years earlier in 1923 (an examination of his birth certificate has confirmed this). The false birth year was probably an attempt to assist his career as a child actor. After spending several years as a child movie actor in Hollywood, he studied the piano there with Lydia Cherkassky, mother and teacher of the renowned pianist Shura Cherkassky. In 1945 he won all three of the major competitions then being held in California: The Young Artist Competition at UCLA (judged by Bruno Walter), the Young Artist Contest of Occidental College, and the Gainsborough Award in San Francisco. He continued his studies at the Juilliard School as a full scholarship student of Olga Samaroff-Stokowski. Later Lewenthal worked in Europe with Alfred Cortot and with Guido Agosti.

Lewenthal made his debut in 1948 with Dimitri Mitropoulos and the Philadelphia Orchestra. The occasion marked the first time a soloist had been invited to play Prokofiev's Piano Concerto No. 3 under Mitropoulos's direction, that being a work which the conductor was famous for playing himself. The success of this performance was followed a few weeks later by Lewenthal's New York recital debut. These events launched his North American career, which flourished until it came to a sudden halt in 1953; while walking through New York's Central Park, Lewenthal was attacked by a gang of hoodlums and suffered broken bones in his hands and arms. After a slow physical and psychological recovery, Lewenthal moved abroad and withdrew from the concert stage except for occasional touring and recording in Europe and South America. During this time he began his research on the French Romantic composer, Charles-Valentin Alkan, with the intention of writing an exhaustive study of Alkan's life and music. Lewenthal's Alkan book remained unpublished at the time of his death.

His first return to the public was through a two-hour broadcast in 1963 for WBAI in New York, on which he played Alkan's works and discussed his life. The response to this program was overwhelming and brought a request from G. Schirmer to prepare an edition of Alkan's piano music. Encouraged by the reception, Lewenthal played a recital including Alkan's music in Town Hall, New York, in September 1964 - his first public appearance there in 12 years. This led to an RCA recording of Alkan's music which was met with critical raves, and then a three-concert Liszt Cycle in New York and London, among many other performances. Lewenthal came to be considered the leader of the "Romantic Revival", reintroducing solo and chamber works by many important but neglected 19th-century composers such as Moscheles, Goetz, Herz, Hummel, Henselt, Scharwenka, Rubinstein, Reubke, Field, Dussek and others, as well as reviving overlooked works by famous composers. He also took an active role in such events as the Romantic Festival at Butler University (Indianapolis) and Newport Music Festival. In 1971 he accepted an invitation to a well received tour of Southern Africa. Lewenthal taught at the Mannes College of Music and The Tanglewood Music Festival, and was a faculty member of the Manhattan School of Music for a number of years beginning in the mid-1970s. Among his doctoral students was Israeli pianist Astrith Baltsan.

Lewenthal's recordings include releases for Westminster Records, Reader's Digest, RCA Victor, Columbia Records/CBS, and Angel Records. In addition to his Schirmer edition of selected Alkan piano works. Lewenthal also prepared for the same publisher an anthology called Piano Music for One Hand and another collection of Encores of Famous Pianists, both containing extensive notes and commentary.

After living for many years in a small apartment at 51 East 78th Street in Manhattan, Lewenthal moved to Hudson, New York, where he spent his last years in semi-seclusion, his concert activity significantly reduced owing to a chronic heart condition. He died on November 21, 1988, aged 65.
