= Élie-Miriam Delaborde =

French pianist and composer

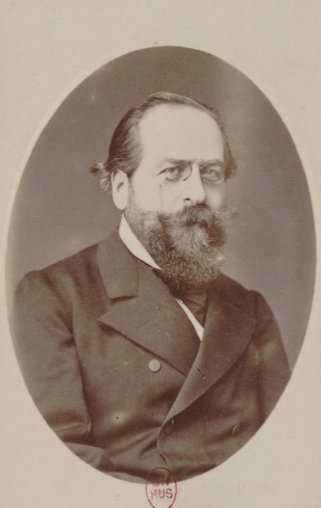
- between 1875 and 1895
- Born: Eraïm-Miriam Delaborde; 7 February 1839; Paris, France
- Died: 9 December 1913 (aged 74); Paris, France
- Burial place: Père Lachaise Cemetery
- Occupations: Pianist and composer
- Parents: Charles-Valentin Alkan (father); Lina Eraïm Miriam (mother)

Élie-Miriam Delaborde (born Eraïm-Miriam Delaborde; 7 February 1839 – 9 December 1913) was a French virtuoso pianist and composer. He was also renowned as a player of the pedal piano.

== Early life ==
His birth was registered under the name of his mother Lina Eraïm Miriam, aged 38, of Nantes, and an unnamed father. Delaborde was generally believed to be the illegitimate son of the composer and pianist Charles-Valentin Alkan and one of his high-class married pupils.

Delaborde was the maiden name of Antoinette, mother of George Sand, the author and sometime lover of Alkan's friend Frédéric Chopin. Some writers have seen some significance in this. Alkan's withdrawal from public life had also coincided with the birth and upbringing of Delaborde. Alkan and Delaborde also shared several similarities such as their similar skill in playing the pedal piano and both of them being parrot enthusiasts. .

== Career ==
He was a pupil of Alkan, Franz Liszt, Ignaz Moscheles, and Adolf von Henselt. He made successful tours of England, Germany and Russia, and travelled with Henri Vieuxtemps and Henryk Wieniawski.

In Spring of 1871, during the Franco-Prussian War, he escaped from France to London with his 121 parrots and cockatoos, as well as two pet monkeys. One of these monkeys he named Isadora, in honor of Isidor Philipp. In 1873 he was appointed professor at the Conservatoire de Paris, where his pupils included Olga Samaroff (one-time wife of Leopold Stokowski), Aline van Barentzen, and Marie Poitevin, the dedicatee of César Franck's Prelude, Chorale and Fugue.

== Personal life ==
Delaborde was a fencer, a passionate athlete, a bon vivant and a ladies' man. He also painted under the pseudonym "Miriam", and was a close friend of Édouard Manet. Camille Saint-Saëns' Piano Concerto No. 3 was dedicated to Delaborde.

=== Affairs ===
Delaborde was also a close friend of fellow composer Georges Bizet and his wife, Geneviève. Delaborde may have been indirectly responsible for Bizet's death, which followed a swimming competition between the two, as a result of which Bizet caught a chill.

After Bizet's death, Delaborde formed an alliance with Geneviève. Scholars have speculated that Delaborde and Geneviève were having an affair even before Bizet's death. The two had signed a marriage contract in August 1876 but never wed. In 1901, he became engaged to a much younger pupil but that engagement also failed to result in marriage.

== Death ==
Delaborde died on 9 December 1913, aged 74, and was buried at Père Lachaise Cemetery on 11 December.

== Compositions ==
His compositions included a youthful opera Maître Martin, the opéra-comique La Reine dort, the overture Attila, preludes, studies and fantasies for piano (including a Grande Fantaise on Bizet's Carmen), a piano quintet, and songs. There is also a Scherzetto for chromatic harp. He also edited some of Alkan's music.

Delaborde's output is significant, but minimal attention has been given to his works. The first acoustic recording in history of one of Delaborde's compositions was Étude d'après une petite Valse de V. Dolmetsch, recorded by Vincenzo Maltempo in 2014, as a part of the Rarities of Piano Music at the "Schloss vor Husum" Festival.

=== Selected other works ===
- Cadence pour le Finale du concerto pour clavecin en ré mineur de J. S. Bach (1872)
- Cadence sur l'Allegro du Concerto en sol, op. 58 de Beethoven. Piano (1878)
- Etudes La bémol majeur (1889)
- Etudes de concert. Piano. La bémol majeur. No 2 (1872)
- Exercices de lecture. Piano. Op. 14, no 4 (1887)
- Étude d'après une petite Valse de V. Dolmetsch (1889)
- Fantaisies from 'Carmen' Op. 8 . [Bizet] (1879)
- Impromptu-valse Ré bémol majeur (1872)
- Ouverture d'Attila (4 mains) (1879)
- Paraphrase on Bundeslied Op. 122 [Beethoven] (1872)
- Petite marche villageoise (1872)
- Prélude. Harpe ou piano. Do majeur (1903)
- Préludes Op. 13
- Promenade de noctambules (1889)
- Scherzetto. Harpe ou piano. Fa majeur (1903)
- Transcriptions. Scherzetto. Symphonie. [Marmontel] (1879)
- Menuet from 'L'Arlésienne' [Bizet] (1873)
- Trois pièces pour harpe chromatique (système G. Lyon) ou piano (1903)
- Valse de concert. Harpe ou piano. Ré bémol majeur (1903)

== Sources ==
- Grove's Dictionary of Music and Musicians, 5th ed, 1954.
- Smith, Ronald (2000), Alkan, the Man, the Music, 2 vols in 1, London: Averill and Kahn.
