= Scherzo diabolico =

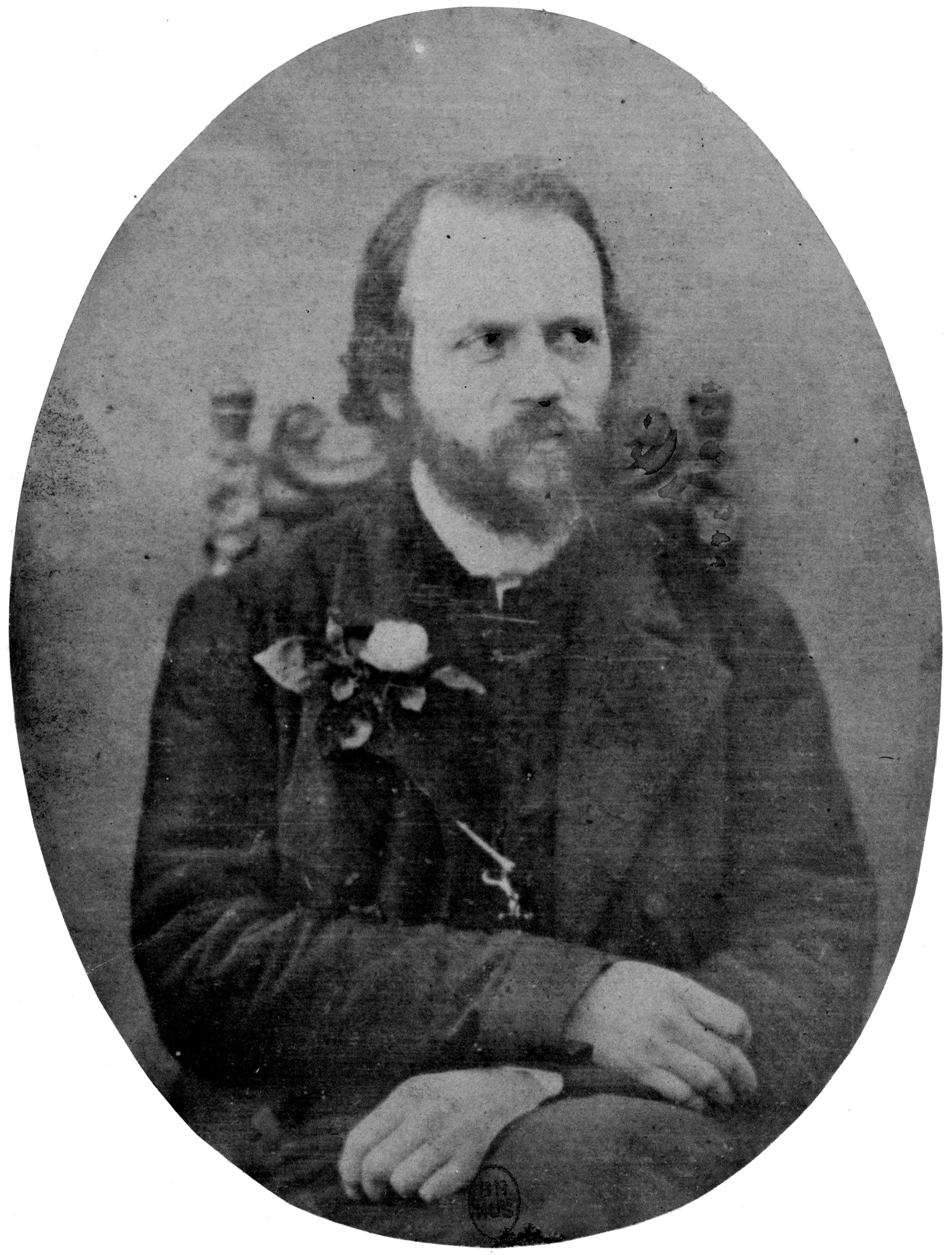
Charles-Valentin Alkan

Scherzo diabolico (Diabolical scherzo) is the third of the Études in the minor keys, Op. 39 for solo piano by the French composer Charles-Valentin Alkan. The piece is in ternary form, beginning in G minor with a trio in G major. It shares many similarities with Chopin's Scherzo No. 2, Op. 31.

The scherzo begins softly, with a phrase in G minor, coloured by a chromatic A♭. This chromaticism recurs throughout the scherzo by the use of the Neapolitan sixth. It is very driving and obsessive, containing numerous fast arpeggios.

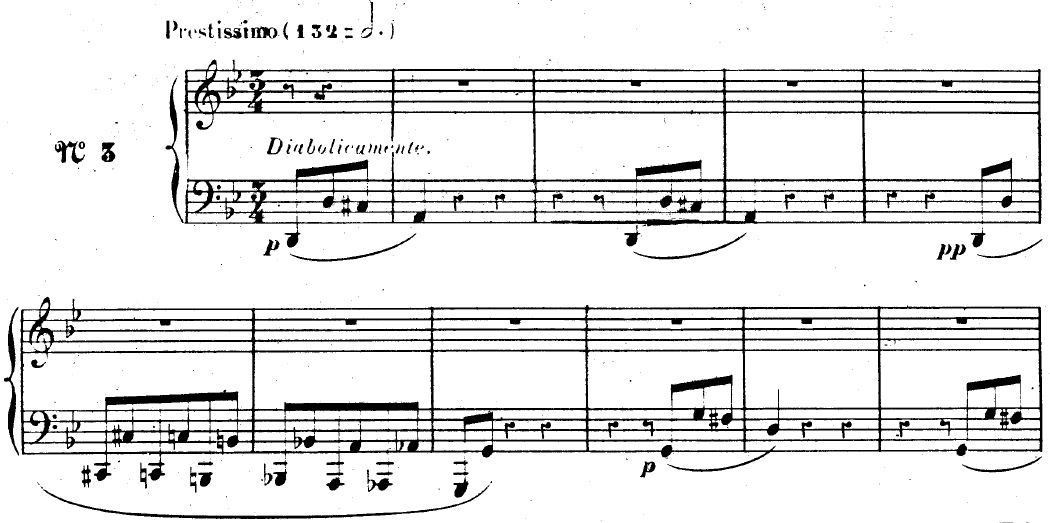

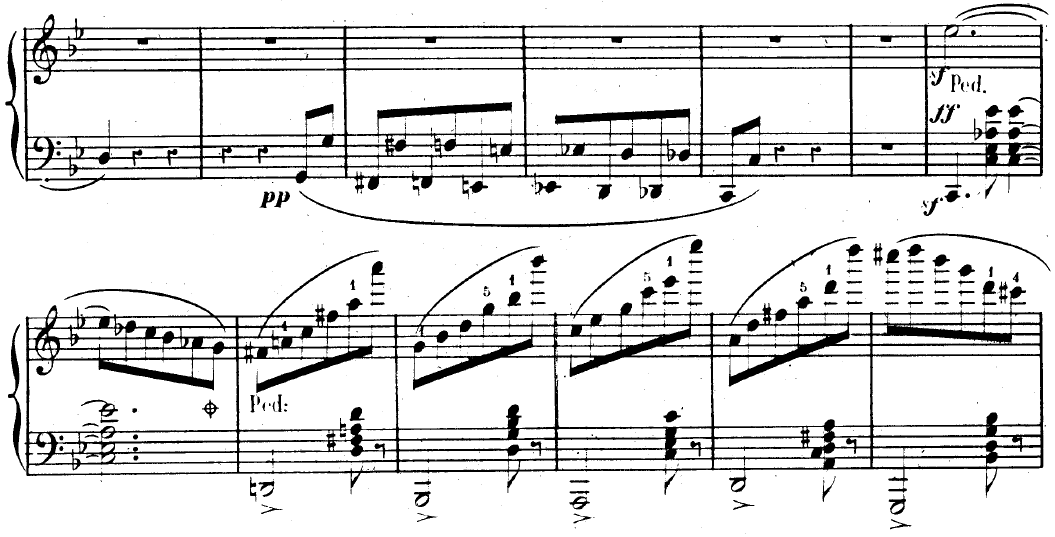

The trio, marked un poco più largamente, is completely contrasting, containing huge, loud chords.

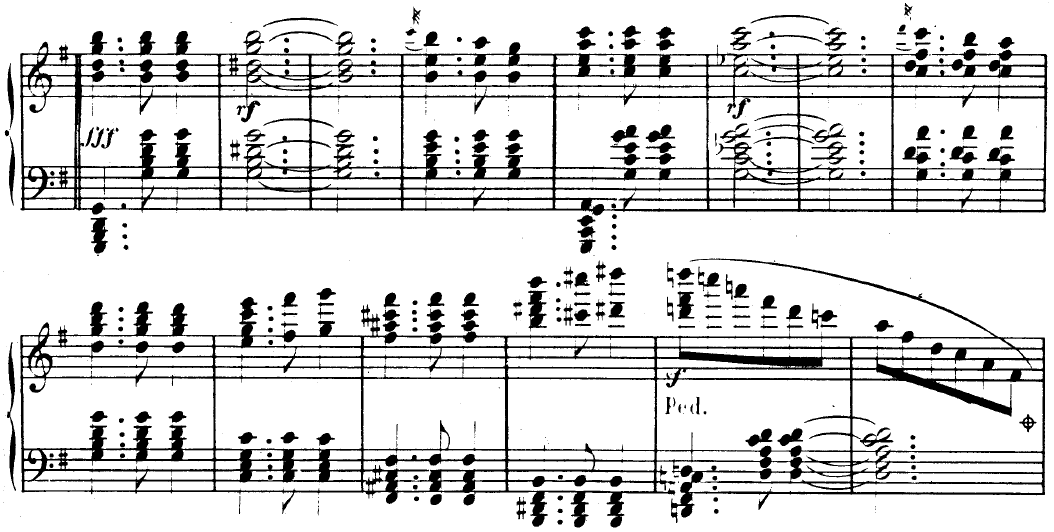

The scherzo then returns, but in ppp, containing an instruction to hold down the una corda and damper pedals. Controlling the huge energy and velocity of the scherzo poses a very difficult challenge to the pianist, and its difficulty is increased on modern pianos.
