= Jack Gibbons =

English-American musician (born 1962)

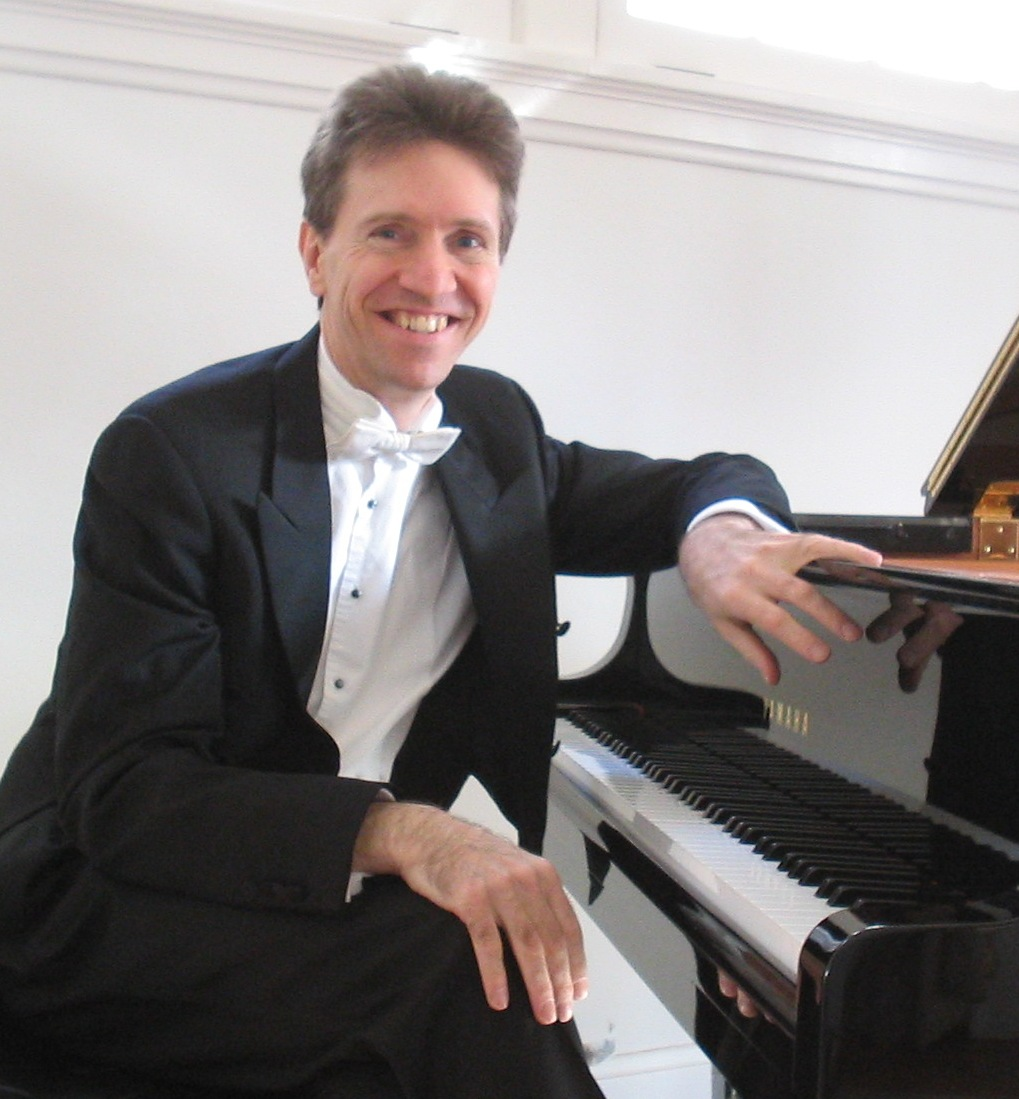
- Gibbons in 2004

Background information
- Born: 1962 (age 63–64)
- Genre: Classical
- Occupations: Pianist, composer
- Website: jackgibbons.com

Jack Gibbons (born 2 March 1962) is an English-born American classical composer and virtuoso pianist.

== Biography ==
Gibbons was born in England. His father was a scientist and his mother a visual artist. He began his piano studies in Stockton-on-Tees, later continuing in Oxford. He began performing in public at the age of 10. He made his London debut in 1979, at the age of 17, with an all-Alkan concert that included Alkan's Concerto for Solo Piano and Ouverture from Op. 39. At the age of 20 he won First Prize in the Newport International Pianoforte Competition, with a performance with the BBC Welsh Symphony Orchestra of Beethoven's Piano Concerto No. 4. In 1984 he made his Queen Elizabeth Hall debut performing J.S. Bach's Goldberg Variations, Chopin's "Funeral March" Sonata and Ravel's Gaspard de la nuit, after which recital The Times wrote that Gibbons "could be Britain's answer to Ivo Pogorelić". Since then Gibbons has played in many prestigious venues and festivals all over the world, as recitalist and concerto soloist.

For 16 years, from 1990 to 2005, Gibbons gave annual all-Gershwin concerts at London's Queen Elizabeth Hall, with a gap in 2001 following a near-fatal car accident. These concerts feature Gibbons' own note-for-note reconstructions and transcriptions of the original recorded improvisations and concert works of George Gershwin. Over the 16 years of his Queen Elizabeth Hall all-Gershwin concerts, Gibbons has given the world premieres of at least 48 reconstructed original Gershwin works. He has also since 1994 given similar all-Gershwin concerts at New York's Merkin Hall, Alice Tully Hall and Carnegie Hall.

In 1992 Gibbons made his recording debut on the Hyperion label (with Constant Lambert's The Rio Grande). The recording was nominated for a Gramophone Award and awarded a Penguin Guide 3-star rosette. Between 1992 and 1997 Gibbons recorded a 4-CD set of recordings entitled "The Authentic George Gershwin", which won an MRA (Music Retailers Award). Issued on the British label ASV, Gibbons' "Authentic George Gershwin" recordings were described by Classic CD as "a unique testimony to Gershwin's genius".

In January 1995, in Oxford, Gibbons became the first pianist ever to perform all 12 of Alkan's Douze Etudes dans les Tons Mineurs, Op. 39 in a single concert (the concert was repeated the following year at the Queen Elizabeth Hall, London). The same month Gibbons recorded the work (its first digital recording) for the ASV label, Gramophone describing the recording as "among the most exhilarating feats of pianism I've heard on disc". The same year, on 27 August 1995 Gibbons made his BBC Proms debut at the Royal Albert Hall with Gershwin's Rhapsody in Blue, the BBC describing Gibbons as "THE Gershwin pianist of our time". In 1997 Gibbons wrote and presented a feature programme for the BBC on George Gershwin in preparation for the centenary of the composer's birth, with actor Sir Ben Kingsley providing the voice of George Gershwin.

In March 2001, Gibbons was involved in a life-threatening car accident. Gibbons' accident and recovery were the subject of much media attention from newspapers, television and radio, with features in The Sunday Times, Gramophone, BBC etc. Michael Church in the Daily Express described Gibbons' subsequent return to the concert platform as "miraculous" and "gutsy". Following his serious car accident, Gibbons has given increasing attention to composing in place of his performing career. After childhood successes as a composer, Gibbons had abandoned his composing for 25 years in favour of performing. Gibbons' own music has since been performed at Carnegie Hall in New York, the Queen Elizabeth Hall in London, and recorded by the BBC. Gibbons' output to date (May 2025) includes over 50 songs and choral works (many for soprano voice, sung by sopranos Leona Mitchell, Christine Brewer, Mary Plazas, Ann Mackay, Suzanne Fleming-Atwood and others), 50 solo piano works, and two works for string orchestra.

Gibbons' performing career still continues alongside his composing. In March 2007 Gibbons gave the first performance at Carnegie Hall of Alkan's Concerto for Solo Piano, in celebration of the 150th anniversary of the work's publication in Paris in 1857. Gibbons continues to perform in Oxford, where he has been presenting and playing an annual summer piano festival every year without a break since 1988. He was appointed artist-in-residence at Davis and Elkins College, in the U.S. state of West Virginia, in June 2010. Gibbons became a naturalized American citizen on 29 November 2023.

== Works ==
List of compositions by Jack Gibbons by category

=== Orchestral ===
- Lament for strings, Op. 41
- Serenade for strings, Op. 71

=== Choral ===
- Cradle Song, Op. 64a
- Ave verum corpus, Op. 89
- Ave verum corpus, Op. 90
- My heart is like a singing bird, Op. 91
- Christmas Bells, Op. 92
- The Lamb Child, Op. 95
- Tomorrow Shall Be My Dancing Day, Op. 100
- The Virgin's Cradle Hymn, Op. 101
- Wiegenlied, Op. 103
- O Magnum Mysterium, Op. 105
- Winter Song (words by Bill King), Op. 102
- Lovely Kind (words by Nicholas Breton), Op. 104
- Christmas Song (words by Lydia Avery Coonley), Op. 108
- Balulalow, Op. 109

=== Songs ===
- Sonnet: Remember me (words by Christina Rossetti), Op. 12
- Phantom of Delight (words by William Wordsworth), Op. 13
- When We Two Parted (words by Lord Byron), Op. 14
- I'll Not Weep (words by Emily Brontë), Op. 15
- Beloved Again (words by Emily Brontë), Op. 16
- Music, when soft voices die (words by Percy Bysshe Shelley), Op. 17
- Echo (words by Christina Rossetti), Op. 18
- Sleep Not (words by Emily Brontë), Op. 19
- Why? (words by Christina Rossetti), Op. 20
- Epitaph for a child (words by Robert Herrick), Op. 21
- The Garden of Love (words by William Blake), Op. 22
- In The Lane (words by Christina Rossetti), Op. 23
- Weep you no more (words by John Dowland), Op. 24
- The Linnet (words by Walter de la Mare), Op. 25
- Roses for the flush of youth (words by Christina Rossetti), Op. 26
- The Bourne (words by Christina Rossetti), Op. 27
- Among the flowers (words by Christina Rossetti), Op. 28
- Love me, I Love You (words by Christina Rossetti), Op. 29
- If I Could Shut the Gate (words anon), Op. 31
- Oh What Comes Over the Sea (words by Christina Rossetti), Op. 32
- Mariana (words by Christina Rossetti), Op. 33
- Shall Earth No More Inspire Thee (words by Emily Brontë), Op. 34
- When I am Dead My Dearest (words by Christina Rossetti), Op. 36
- Echo's Song (words by Ben Jonson), Op. 40
- Once (words by Christina Rossetti), Op. 43
- Perhaps (to R.A.L.) (words by Vera Brittain), Op. 47
- A Life Beyond (words by Jack Gibbons), Op. 52
- The Sun Is Set (words by Jack Gibbons), Op. 57
- Sapessi pure! (words by Christina Rossetti), Op. 58
- Sing A Song of Spring (words by Jack Gibbons), Op. 60
- May (words by Christina Rossetti), Op. 61
- A Red, Red Rose (words by Robert Burns), Op. 62
- I Love My Jean (words by Robert Burns), Op. 63
- Cradle Song (words by John Phillip), Op. 64
- A Love Alive (words by Jack Gibbons), Op. 65
- Life (words by Charlotte Brontë), Op. 67
- The Parting Day (words by Edith Wharton), Op. 68
- The One Grief (words by Edith Wharton), Op. 69
- How Sweet I Roam'd from Field to Field (words by William Blake), Op. 72
- Longing (words by Matthew Arnold), Op. 73
- The Aspen (words by A. E. Housman), Op. 74
- Roses (words by Edna St. Vincent Millay), Op. 75
- Lullaby of an Infant Chief (words by Sir Walter Scott), Op. 76

=== Solo piano ===
- Siciliano, Op. 30
- Prelude in A flat, Op. 37
- Tarantella, Op. 38
- Waltz in E major, Op. 39
- Prière, Op. 44
- Song Without Words, Op. 45
- Contredanse, Op. 46
- Song from the Old World, Op. 48
- Waltz in G major, Op. 49
- Music Box, Op. 50
- Lullaby (in memoriam), Op. 51
- Waltz in F minor, Op. 53
- Sarabande, Op. 54
- Waltz in E flat minor, Op. 55
- Prelude in E major, Op. 56
- Sehnsucht, Op. 59
- A New World Song, Op. 66
- Waltz for a musical box, Op. 77
- Waltz in F major, Op. 78
- Nocturne in F sharp, Op. 79
- Melody in F sharp, Op. 80
- Minuetto malinconico, Op. 81
- 7 Esquisses, Op. 82
- Andantino, Op. 83
- Preludio, Op. 84
- Menuetto antico, Op. 85
- Nocturne in D flat, Op. 86
- Menuetto semplice, Op. 87
- Consolation, Op. 88
- Nocturne in B flat minor, Op. 93
- Romance, Op. 96
- Impromptu in C major, Op. 98
- Folk song, Op. 99
- Appalachian Fancy, Op. 107
- Solace, Op. 110
- Piano Suite in E, Op. 111
- Fantaisie, Op.116

=== Chamber music ===
- Siciliano for flute and piano, Op. 70
- Siciliano a quattro mani Op. 70a
- Siciliano for flute, cello and piano, Op. 70b
- Song Prelude, for piano duet, Op. 94
- Valse élégiaque, for piano duet, Op. 106
