= Vincenzo Maltempo =

- Born: July 2, 1985 (age 40); Benevento, Italy
- Genres: Classical
- Instrument: Piano
- Labels: Piano Classics, Gramola, Brilliant Classics, Toccata Classics
- Website: vincenzomaltempo.com

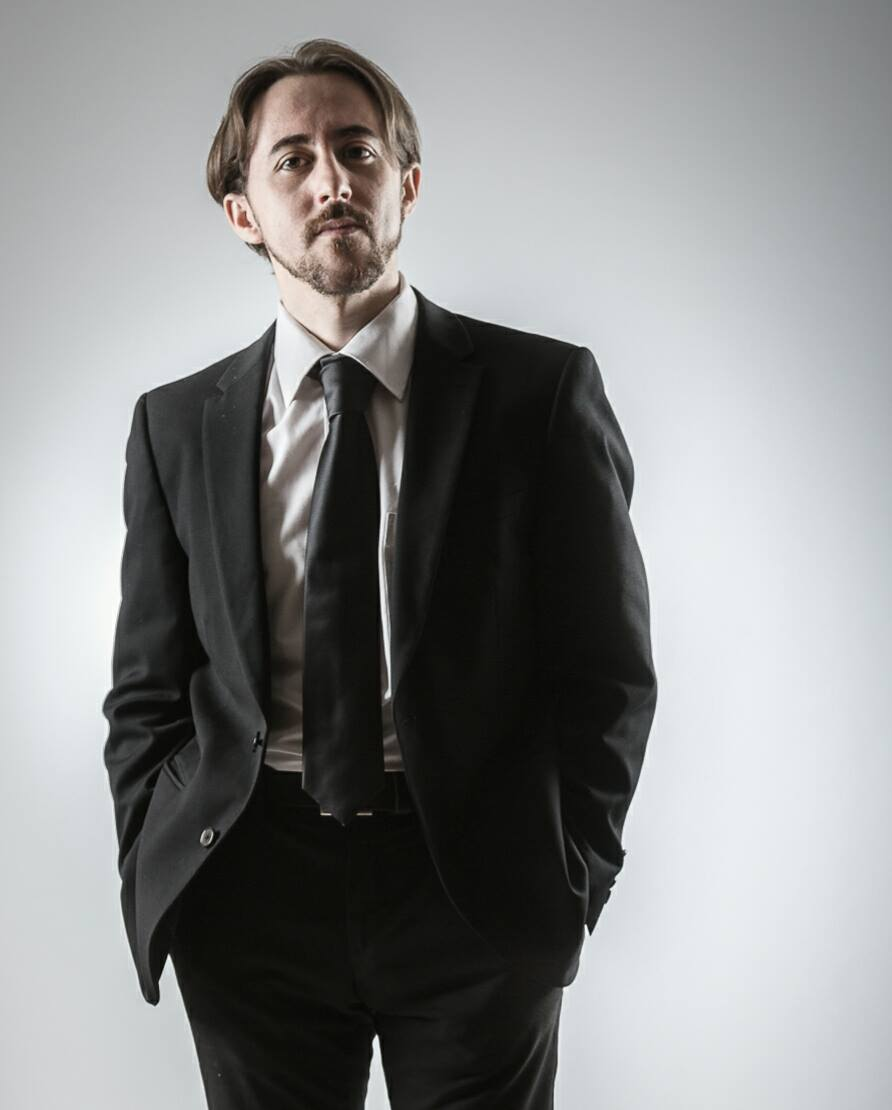

Vincenzo Maltempo (born July 2, 1985) is an Italian pianist. He was born in Benevento, Italy.

He began his musical studies with Salvatore Orlando, disciple of the pianist Sergio Fiorentino, with whom he graduated at S. Cecilia Conservatory in Rome, summa cum laude. From 2006 to 2009 he attended the courses held by Riccardo Risaliti at the International Piano Academy "Incontri col Maestro" in Imola.

In 2006 he won the XXIII Competition "Premio Venezia", in Teatro "La Fenice" (Venice, Italy), and began a successful international career playing in the Theater "La Fenice" in Venice, "Teatro Lirico" in Cagliari, the "Liszt Festival" in Austria, and in concert halls in Spain, Germany, the Netherlands, United Kingdom, Mexico, USA and Japan.

His first recording was released in 2008 by Gramola and dedicated to Franz Liszt. Afterwards, from 2011, he began a series of recordings with Piano Classics dedicated to Charles-Valentin Alkan. Maltempo is considered one of the most important and devoted advocates of Alkan ("With these passionate recordings Maltempo confirms his place in the restricted circle of Alkan's best performers"). His CDs have gained great approval by international critics, obtaining five-star review in papers like The Guardian and Diapason. Furthermore, he is one of the few pianists who has recorded the complete set of Alkan's Études Op. 39, and one of only three pianists who have played the complete set of these Etudes in one concert (November 2, 2013 in Yokohama, Minato Mirai Hall, Japan).

His Alkan recordings for Piano Classics also include other works such as the Grande Sonate Op. 33, the Sonatine Op. 61 and the Trois Morceaux dans le genre pathétique Op. 15. Maltempo also collaborated with Italian pianist Emanuele Delucchi on a CD of the complete Vianna da Motta transcriptions of organ works by Alkan.

In September 2014 he was nominated "Honorary Member" of the London Alkan Society.

His repertoire goes from the baroque to modern music, with a particular interest in romantic music and in the less-performed piano repertoire (Charles Valentin Alkan, Leopold Godowsky, Élie-Miriam Delaborde, Jean-Henri Ravina, Pierre-Joseph-Guillaume Zimmermann, Cécile Chaminade, et al.). He also published for Ries & Erler piano transcriptions of the Second Suite from the ballet "Daphnis et Chloé" by M. Ravel and the Symphony by Hans Rott, the first piano solo concert transcription of that work.

He is one of the founders and a piano teacher of the "Imola Piano Academy - Talent development Eindhoven", a piano Academy in the Netherlands founded by the pianist Andrè Gallo under the advocacy of the International Piano Academy "Incontri col Maestro" in Imola; he gave masterclasses at the European Arts Academy "Aldo Ciccolini" in Trani. He is a piano teacher in the Italian Conservatory.

== Prizes and awards ==
- Honorary member of the "Alkan Society", London Who we are
- National Prize "Franco Enriquez" 2016 Centro Studi Franco Enriquez

== Discography ==
- F. Liszt: Klavierwerke (Gramola 98861) 2009
- Ch. V. Alkan: Grande Sonate and Piano Solo Symphony (Piano Classics PCL0038) 2012
- Ch. V. Alkan: Le festin d'Esope, Sonatine, Ouverture and Trois Morceaux Op. 15 (Piano Classics PCL0056) 2013
- Ch. V. Alkan: Piano Solo Concerto and Etudes Op. 39 n. 1, 2, 3 (Piano Classics PCL0061) 2013
- Ch. V. Alkan/Da Motta: The Complete Vianna da Motta Transcriptions (Toccata Classics TOCC0237) 2014
- R. Schumann: Piano Sonata Op.14, Romanzen Op.28, Humoreske Op. 20 (Piano Classics PCL0074) 2014
- Ch. V Alkan: Chanson de la folle au bord de la mer: A Collection of Eccentric Piano Works (Piano Classics PCL0083) 2015
- Esposito – Music for Violin and Piano (Brilliant Classics 95102) 2015
- Alkan Genius-Enigma – 3CD (Piano Classics PCLM0088) 2015, reissue
- Liszt - Hungarian Rhapsodies (Complete) - 2 CD (Piano Classics PCL0108) 2016
- Sergei Lyapunov - Lyapunov: 12 études d'exécution transcendente, Op. 11 (Piano Classics PCL0124) 2017
- Brahms: Piano Concerto Nos 1 & 2 - Vincenzo Maltempo piano, Mitteleuropa Orchestra, Marco Guidarini conductor (Piano Classics PCL10145) 2018
- Russian Piano Sonatas, Volume 1 - Balakirev, Glazunov, Kozenko (Piano Classics PCL10159) 2018
- L. van Beethoven: Complete Bagatelle, Diabelli & Eroica Variations (Piano Classics PCL10181)
- Scriabin Complete Piano Sonatas (Piano Classics PCL10168) 2019
- P. Dukas: Complete Piano music (PCL10171)
- Maltempo also made the first recording of the "Le Régret", valse-étude mélancolique op. 332, by Charles Mayer; this piece was usually attributed to Frédéric Chopin as "Valse mélancolique Op. posth.", until the Italian musical critic Luca Chierici attributed this work to Mayer.
