= Ronald Smith (musician) =

English classical pianist and teacher (1922–2004)

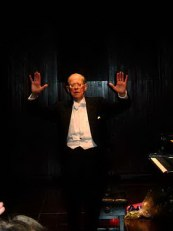
Ronald Smith photographed after one of his last public concerts, at the Queen Elizabeth Hall, London, 2003

Ronald Bertram Smith (3 January 1922 – 27 May 2004) was a British classical pianist and teacher.

== Birth and education ==
Smith was born in London, and grew up in Sussex. He was educated at Lewes County Grammar School and the Brighton College of Music. He entered the Royal Academy of Music at the age of 16 with the Sir Michael Costa Scholarship for composition. After leaving the academy he studied privately in Paris with Marguerite Long, while also taking an external BMus degree from Durham University.

He was influenced by the pianist Edwin Fischer, whom he impressed as a contestant in the 1949 Geneva international piano competition. When Fischer visited London he selected Smith and Denis Matthews to play the second and third piano parts in his recording of Bach's triple keyboard concerto. Smith said he learnt more in four days working with Fischer than he had in his years of previous study.

== Professional career ==
As a performer, Smith championed piano works from the romantic period. In the 1940s he was first asked to record music by the then neglected Charles-Valentin Alkan, his Concerto for Solo Piano. He was sent the score by Humphrey Searle: when he first saw it he thought it "seemed unplayable". He later recorded many of Alkan's works, and also wrote a biography. His efforts played a major role in rekindling interest in Alkan, including remaining president of the Alkan Society from 1977 when it was formed until his death.

His recorded legacy encompasses pioneering performances of Alkan, including the complete studies in all the minor keys Op. 39, as well as music by Chopin, Schubert, Beethoven, Balakirev and Liszt.

He taught the piano for many years, first at Harrow School from 1943, and then at The King's School, Canterbury from the 1950s to 1990. Freddy Kempf was one such pupil. He then took auditions at the Kent School of Music (Canterbury) to select private students to whom he could donate his spare time.

== Private life ==
Smith married the cellist Anne Norman in 1969, and they had one daughter, the artist Beka Smith. They established a family home at Saltwood in Kent, in a large house which afforded space for a music studio.

Smith died in Hythe, Kent, aged 82, on 27 May 2004.
