= Allegro de concert (Chopin) =

Concert piece for solo piano by Frédéric Chopin

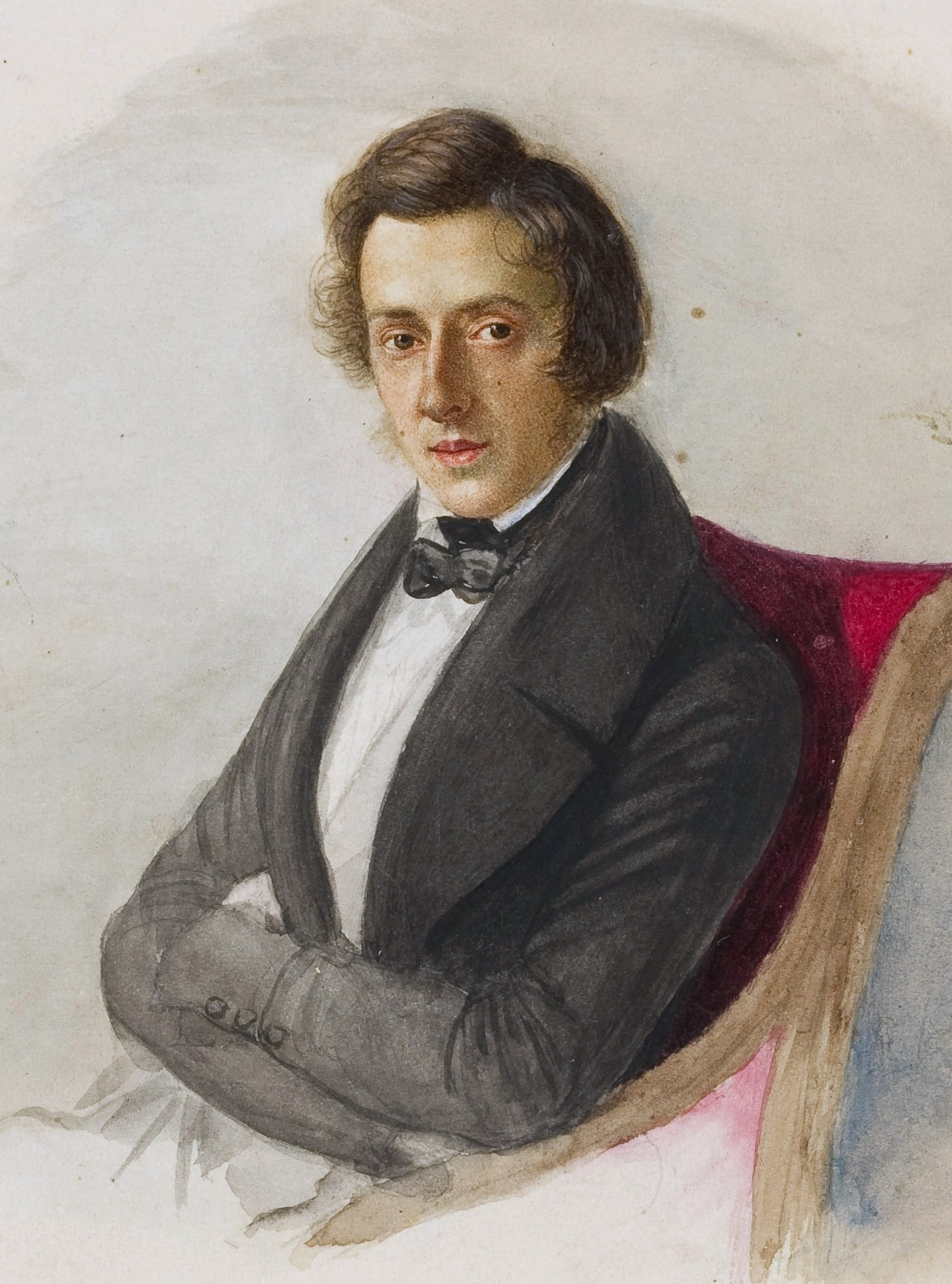
Frédéric Chopin at 25, by his fiancée Maria Wodzińska, 1835

Frédéric Chopin's Allegro de concert, Op. 46, is a piece for piano, published in November 1841. It is in one movement and takes between 11 and 15 minutes to play. The principal themes are bold and expressive. It has a curious place in the Chopin canon, and while its history is obscure, the evidence supports the view, shared by Robert Schumann and others, that it started out as the first movement of a projected third piano concerto, of which the orchestral parts are either now non-existent or were never scored at all. There is no evidence that Chopin ever even started work on the latter movements of this concerto.

The autograph manuscript of the work is preserved in the National Library of Poland.

== History ==
Allegro de concert, Op. 46
Performed by Olga Gurevich

Chopin published his two piano concertos in 1830. That same year, he wrote that he was planning a concerto for two pianos and orchestra, and would play it with his friend Tomasz Napoleon Nidecki if he managed to finish it. He worked on it for some months, but he had the greatest difficulty with it, and this work never eventuated; however, he may have used ideas from it in later works.

There is also evidence that Chopin started work on a third concerto for piano and orchestra. In Chopin: The Piano Concertos, Rink quotes from an unpublished Chopin letter, dated 10 September 1841, offering Breitkopf & Härtel an "Allegro maestoso (du 3e Concerto) pour piano seul" for 1,000 francs. In November 1841, Schlesinger published the Allegro de concert, which has a tempo indication of "Allegro maestoso", and Breitkopf & Härtel also published it in December of the same year. The work has the general characteristics of the opening movement of a concerto from around that time. It contains a lengthy introduction, with the section corresponding to the original piano solo commencing at bar 87. It seems clear that the "Allegro maestoso" Chopin referred to in his letter was the piece published two months later as Allegro de concert, Op. 46.

The first few notes of the piece were drafted around 1832, but it is not known when the rest of the piece was written. Chopin dedicated it to Friederike Müller, one of his favourite pupils, who studied with him for 18 months (1839–1841). Franz Liszt gave her the nickname "Mademoiselle opus quarante-six" ("forty six", the work's opus number, in French).

== Reception ==
The Allegro de concert includes certain devices which reflect a more virtuosic technique than that required by most of his other works. Technical difficulties include dense musical textures, complex and light finger work, massive leaps of left hand chords, trills and scales in double notes, and difficult octaves. For this reason, it is considered one of Chopin's most difficult pieces, but regardless of this challenge, some pianists and critics find it unconvincing.

It has received relatively little attention in the concert hall or in recordings, and it is not particularly well known to music lovers. Those who have recorded it include Heinrich Neuhaus, Claudio Arrau, Nikolai Demidenko, Garrick Ohlsson, Nikita Magaloff, Idil Biret, Vladimir Ashkenazy and Roger Woodward, Boris Bloch However, Chopin himself seems to have been very proud of it. He told Aleksander Hoffmann: "This is the very first piece I shall play in my first concert upon returning home to a free Warsaw". Chopin never returned to Warsaw, and it is perhaps for this reason that there is no record of him ever playing it in public. In fact, there seems to be no record of its first public performance at all. (Claude Debussy played it at the Paris Conservatoire in July 1879.)

The work received one of its rare public performances at the Queen Elizabeth Hall in the early 1980s as the opening work for a 'quasi orchestral' solo piano recital by British pianist Mark Latimer that ended with only the second London performance of the equally demanding Concerto for Solo Piano by Charles-Valentin Alkan.

== Transcriptions ==
Some attempts have been made to score the Allegro de concert for piano and orchestra as probably originally intended by Chopin. Jean Louis Nicodé produced two versions—one for two pianos, and a later one for piano and orchestra—but he added various parts of his own creation, amounting to 70 bars of new music (a development section after bar 205, a third tutti, etc.). He also "beefs up" the piano part towards the end. This version was first played by the Dutch pianist Marie Geselschap in New York City, with an orchestra conducted by Anton Seidl.

In the early 1930s, Kazimierz Wiłkomirski made another orchestration that was faithful to Chopin's published score. The world premiere recording of this version was by Michael Ponti with the Berlin Symphony Orchestra under Volker Schmidt-Gertenbach.

The Australian pianist Alan Kogosowski went further. In addition to restructuring and augmenting Chopin's music for the Allegro de concert into a new treatment for piano and orchestra, he also created settings for piano and orchestra of the Nocturne in C-sharp minor, Op. posth. "Lento con gran espressione", and the Bolero in C major-A minor, Op. 19. Kogosowski put these together as a three-movement work and performed it under the misleading title of "Chopin's Piano Concerto No. 3 in A major" on 8 October 1999, with the Detroit Symphony Orchestra under Neeme Järvi.

Austrian pianist Ingolf Wunder orchestrated and recorded it with the Warsaw Philharmonic Orchestra in 2015 for Deutsche Grammophon.

The German musicologist and composer Timo Jouko Herrmann also orchestrated the movement, which was played by Martin Stadtfeld in the recording Chopin: Return to Warsaw.

== Sources ==
- James Huneker: Chopin, The Man and His Music
