= Émile Durand =

French musical theorist, teacher and composer (1830–1903)

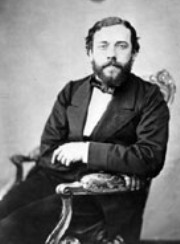
- Émile Durand (1830–1903)
- Born: 16 February 1830; Saint-Brieuc, Côtes-d'Armor
- Died: 7 May 1903 (aged 73); Neuilly-sur-Seine
- Citizenship: France
- Occupation: Composer

Émile Durand (French: [emil dyʁɑ̃]; 16 February 1830 – 7 May 1903) was a French musical theorist, teacher and composer. He was better known for his theoretical writings than for his compositions.

== Biography ==
Émile Durand was born in 1830, at Saint-Brieuc, Côtes-d'Armor, in the Brittany region of France, and moved south with his family to Montpellier when he was 12 years old. He entered the Paris Conservatoire in 1845 at age 15, in the class of Napoléon Alkan (brother of Charles-Valentin Alkan). François Bazin and Fromental Halévy were among his other noteworthy teachers. In 1853, he won the second Grand Prix de Rome with his cantata Le Rocher d'Appenzell.

He joined the conservatoire as a teacher of music theory and harmony, succeeding his own teacher Bazin in 1871. His pupils includes Gabriel Pierné, Claude Debussy, Camille Erlanger and Arthur Goring Thomas. See: List of music students by teacher: C to F#Émile Durand.

Durand favored writing popular songs (chansons) and art songs (mélodies), although he also produced a few lighter works for stage early in his career, including the opéra comique L'Elixir de Cormelius in 1868, and the operetta L'Astronome de Pont-Neuf in 1869.

He remained attached to the region of his birth throughout his life. As a member of cultural and social groups such as "The Bretons de Paris," also called "La Pomme", he participated in their Celtic dinners, cultural and musical celebrations. The influence of his musical colleagues Louis-Albert Bourgault-Ducoudray, Guy Ropartz, and Louis Tiercelin, members of the Breton Renaissance Movement, is particularly evident in his Chants d'Armorique composed in 1889.

At the request of the publisher Leduc, Durand spent the last twenty years of his life writing his major theoretical works for which he is best remembered: Traité d'harmonie théorique et pratique (1881), Traité d'accompagnement pratique au piano (1884) and Traité de composition musicale (1899).

Émile Durand died in Neuilly-sur-Seine, Hauts-de-Seine on 6 or 7 May 1903, and he was buried at Père Lachaise Cemetery in Paris.

== Selected compositions ==
- L'Elixir de Cormelius, Opéra comique, 1868 (libretto by Henri Meilhac and Arthur Delavigne, f.p. Fantaisies Parisiennes, 3 February 1868)
- L'Astronome de Pont-Neuf, pochade musicale, 1869 (libretto by Jules Moinaux, f.p. Variétés, 18 February 1869)
- Sourires de Bretagne, fantaisie for oboe, violin, and clarinet, 1888
- numerous songs, including the well-known composition Comme à vingt ans (1858), sung by Théodore Botrel
- works for piano.

== Selected writings ==
Treatises on music theory and harmony:

- Traité d’harmonie théorique et pratique, 1881
- Traité d’accompagnement pratique au piano, 1884
- Traité de composition musicale, 1899
- Solfège élémentaire
- Solfège melodique
- Traite de transposition
