= Santiago Masarnau Fernández =

Spanish Pianist and Composer

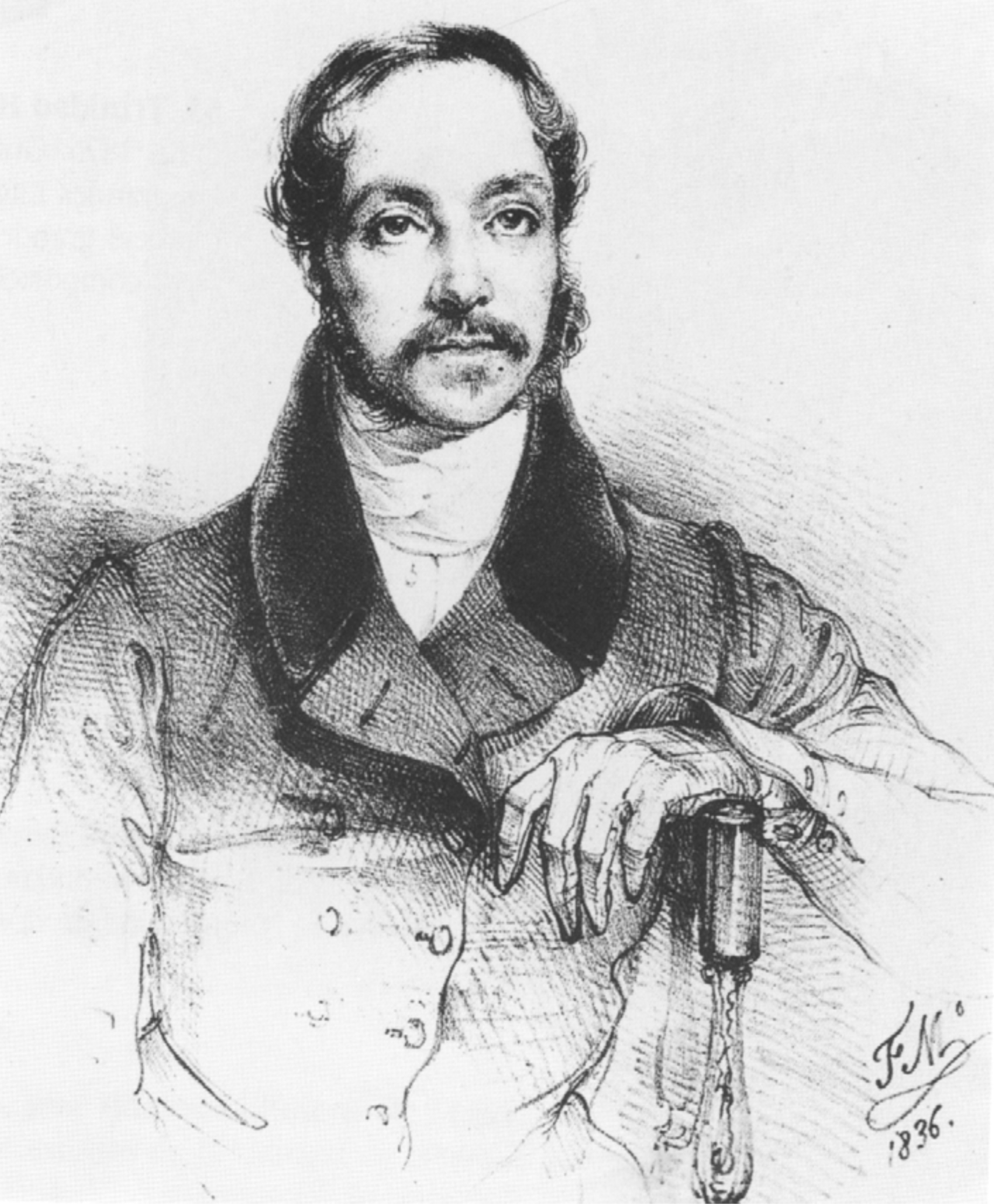
Santiago Masarnau Fernandéz, by Federico de Madrazo (1836)

Santiago Masarnau y Fernández (9 December 1805 – 14 December 1882; also known as Santiago Fernández de Masarnau or Santiago [de] Masarnau) was a Spanish pianist, composer and religious activist for the poor. He established the Society of Saint Vincent de Paul, an organization composed of laymen dedicated to serving the poor, in Spain. A cause for his canonization has been opened by that society.

== Early life ==
Masarnau was born in Madrid in 1805 to Santiago Masarnau y Torres, a native of Copons in Catalonia and Beatriz Fernández y Carredano, from the Omoño sector of the town of Ribamontán al Monte in Cantabria, a family with close connections to the Spanish aristocracy and court. His mother died in 1808. At that same time, after the abdication of King Ferdinand VII of Spain and the subsequent outbreak of the Peninsular War, Masarnau senior was appointed the Secretary of the Royal Association of Nobility of Córdoba, in the service of the Count of Miranda, and the father moved with his three children to Andalucia. The son proved to be a musical prodigy in his childhood, and soon began the study of music under the organist of the Cathedral of Granada, José Rouré y Llamas. When King Ferdinand regained the throne in 1814, the father was appointed a secretary to the Chief Royal Majordomo (Camarero mayor) and the family returned to Madrid. There the son was able to participate in the musical life of the Escorial, performing on the organ before King Ferdinand (including some of his own compositions) when he was only ten years old. Life at court was highly dependent on royal favour, and Masarnau's father was obliged, for unclear reasons, to quit his privileges as a Gentleman of the Royal Household in the 1820s.

Following the family’s eviction from the court, Masarnau abandoned his original intentions of a career in engineering, and went to study music in Paris. He may have been influenced in the decision to leave Spain by political sympathies with the liberal insurgency that sought to depose the king in these years. For twenty years Masarnau divided his life between Paris, London and Madrid. In both Paris and London he was close to the Spanish composer José Melchor Gomis (1791–1836), himself a Spanish rebel living in exile, who composed the Himno de Riego, since used as the national anthem by the various republican governments of Spain. He also wrote some successful operas in Paris and got some respectful reviews from Hector Berlioz, was also active in London, and perhaps introduced Masarnau to London musical life.

As a consequence of his studies and work in Paris and London (1825), Masarnau became acquainted with Johann Baptist Cramer, Pierre-Alexandre Monsigny, Rossini, Paganini, and, it appears, Felix Mendelssohn, who is said to have admired Masarnau’s nocturne, Spleen. Three Scherzini by Masarnau were published in London in 1828, at a time when Gomis was also publishing Spanish-style keyboard pieces there. Masarnau also became a friend of the English pianist and teacher Henry Ibbot Field (1797–1848), and around 1834 became a close friend of Charles-Valentin Alkan (as evidenced by an exchange of often intimate letters extending over forty years).

I love you, less for the incredible variety of your knowledge, than for yourself, for the goodness of your soul; which is perhaps the fruit of your unusual learning. I love you, but with a friendship that admits no sharing - a friendship which resembles constantly the fleeting love that an impassioned woman may have for you for a moment.

— Charles-Valentin Alkan to Santiago de Masarnau (3.1.1835)

Alkan dedicated to Masarnau his Trois études de bravoure op. 16 of 1837. While in Paris again from 1837 to 1843, Masarnau became, at Rossini’s recommendation, the music teacher of the daughters of the Infante Prince Francisco de Paula.

== Musical legacy ==
Masarnau's music is not well known today. In 2021 it was revived in a piano recital by Josep Colom at the Fundacion Juan March in Madrid. The concert, which was broadcast on Radio Clásica (RTVE), presented Masarnau's music in the context of his European contemporaries.

== Dedication to religion ==
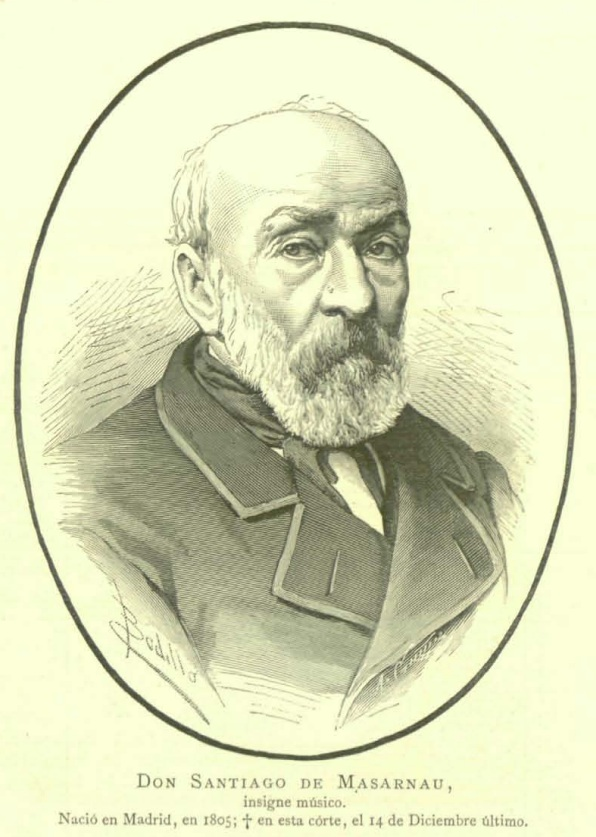

In 1838 Masarnau had a profound religious experience which was to transform his life. As a consequence he determined to devote himself to the poor. In 1839 he came into contact with the Society of Saint Vincent de Paul in the Parisian parish of St. Louis d'Antin. The Society had been founded in 1833 by a charismatic 20-year-old lawyer, Frédéric Ozanam (who was beatified by the Catholic Church in 1997), and was conceived as a Christian reaction to Saint-Simonism (which was attractive to many musicians including Ferdinand Hiller and Félicien David). The Society was dedicated to improving the lot of the poor; and although a lay Catholic organisation, it had a strictly male membership.

"The rules adopted were very simple; it was forbidden to discuss politics or personal concerns at the meetings, and it was settled that the work should be the service of God in the persons of the poor, whom the members were to visit at their own dwellings and assist by every means in their power. The service of the members was to embrace, without distinction of creed or race, the poor, the sick, the infirm, and the unemployed".

Masarnau devoted himself to the Society and became treasurer of the St. Louis d'Antin chapter. During this period he turned more to the composition of church music than of salon items.

When Masarnau returned permanently to Spain in 1843 he remained active in music, teaching in his brother's school, and contributing to a number of critical and artistic journals. But his main work was the establishment of the Society in his own country. This proved however not to be straightforward—the Spaniards were suspicious of this "foreign" organisation and of its apparently "secular" nature. Eventually in 1850 the Society in Spain was formally founded with the support of Pope Gregory XVI, after which it grew dramatically. Its success apparently aroused some political opposition—in 1868 the Society was forcibly dissolved by the Spanish state and its property seized. In 1874 the Society in Spain was allowed to re-establish itself, and Masarnau continued to lead it until his death.

Masarnau died in Madrid in 1882 and was buried in the Cemetery of the Sacramental of San Justo in Madrid.

== Veneration ==
On 13 May 1996, Masarnau's remains were exhumed and transferred to the National Church of the Society of St. Vincent de Paul for Spain. To commemorate the 150th anniversary of the establishment of the Society in Spain, on 11 November 1999 the Vincentian Fathers, under whose spiritual guidance the Society serves, opened a cause for his canonization.

== Sources ==
- Quadrado, José María. "Biografía de D. Santiago Masarnau". Madrid, 1905
- Federico Suárez, Santiago Masarnau y las Conferencias de San Vicente de Paúl, 1994. (un Googlebooks)
- Catholic Encyclopaedia, Society of St. Vincent de Paul
- Andres Ruiz Tarazona, Masarnau Fernandez, Santiago de, on Fundacion Juan March website (in Spanish). Madrid 1981
- The Alkan Society, Bulletins, Starting No.88, December 2012, Alkan's letters to Masanau
- Flores Auñón, Juan Carlos. "Semblanza Biográfica de Santiago Masarnau Fernández". Madrid, 1998
- "Positio super vita, virtutibus et fama santitatis Servi Dei Iacobi Masarnau Fernández. Christifidelis laici. Fundador y Primer presidente de la Sociedad de San Vicente de Paúl (1805–1882)" Madrid, 2006
