= Céleste Alkan =

French musician

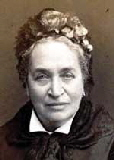
Céleste Alkan

Céleste Alkan (born Céleste Morhange, after marriage Céleste Marix) (25 February 1812 – 25 December 1897) was a French musician, the sister of the pianist and composer Charles-Valentin Alkan and the music professor Napoléon Alkan.

== Life ==
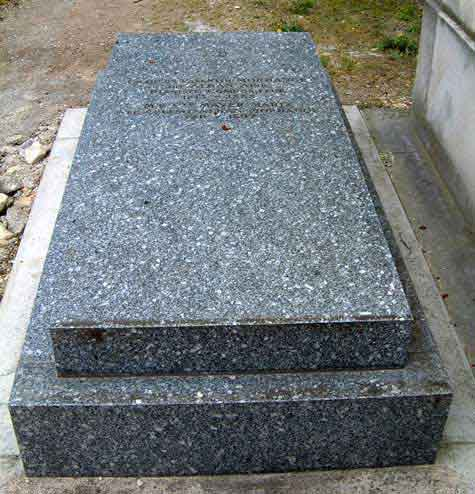
Grave of Charles-Valentin Alkan and Céleste (Alkan) Marix, Montmartre Cemetery

She was born Céleste Morhange in Paris on 25 February 1812 to Jewish parents, Alkan Morhange and his wife Julie (née Abraham).

From 1819 until 1832 she was a student at the Paris Conservatoire under the name Céleste Alkan, where she studied solfége (gaining first prize in 1823), singing and basso continuo. In 1828 she was a class-mate at the Conservatoire of Cornélie Falcon, who became her friend. She left the Conservatoire in 1832 as a consequence of absence and illness.

On September 14, 1837 Céleste married a cousin, Mayer Marix, a dealer in musical instruments, and the inventor of a portable organ, the "harmoniflûte". Their daughter, Marie Marix, was a singer who participated in C.-V. Alkan's series of Petits concerts in Paris in the 1870s. Their second daughter, Albertine, was the mother of the artist Jacques Nam.

Céleste Alkan is buried in Montmartre Cemetery in the same grave as her brother Charles-Valentin.
