= Jean Louis Nicodé =

Prussian pianist, composer and conductor (1853-1919)

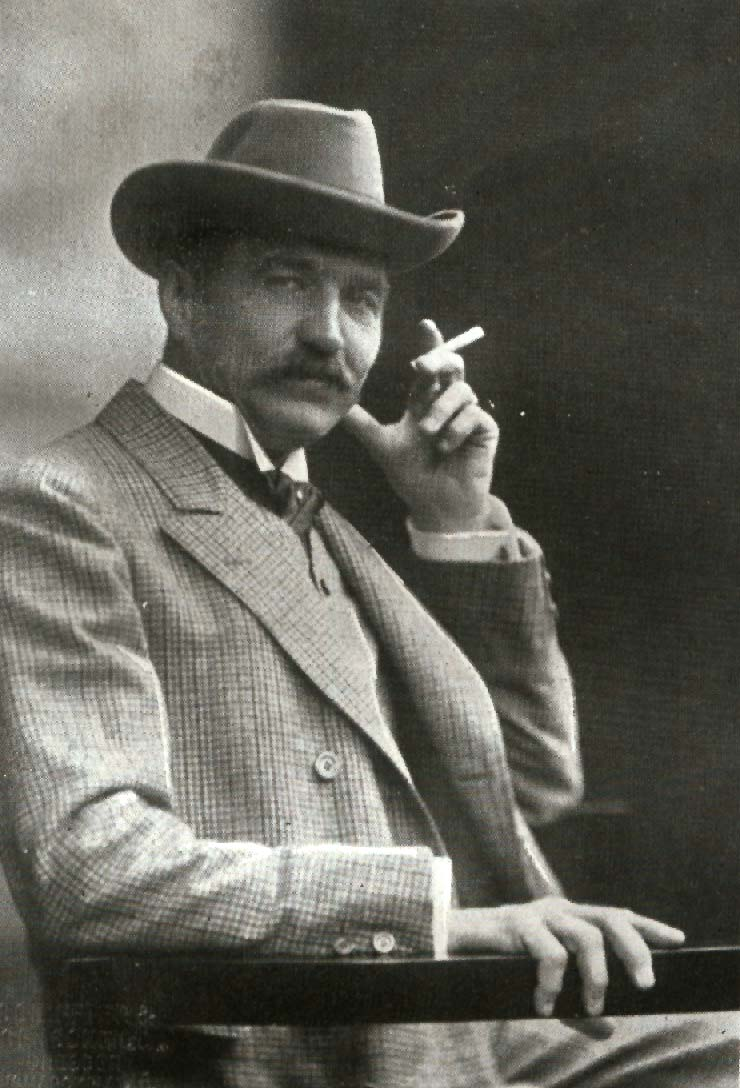
- Born: August 12, 1853; Jeżyce, Poznań, Kingdom of Prussia
- Died: October 5, 1919 (age 66); Langebrück, Germany
- Education: New Academy of Music in Berlin
- Occupations: Composer, pianist
- Notable work: "Gloria!" Symphony
- Style: Romanticism

Jean Louis Nicodé (12 August 1853 – 5 October 1919) was a Prussian pianist, composer and conductor.

== Biography ==
He was born in Jersitz (Jeżyce) (now part of Poznań). He was initially taught by his father, an amateur violinist, pianist, conductor and composer. He entered the New Academy of Music in Berlin in 1869, where he studied piano under Theodor Kullak, harmony under Würst and counterpoint and composition with Kiel.

He became a teacher, and established the Nicodé Concerts. He accompanied Désirée Artôt on a concert tour of Galicia and Romania, then became professor at the Royal Conservatory in Dresden. Nicodé married Fanny Kinnell (1864–1916) in 1887. In 1888 he devoted himself entirely to composition.

Nicodé died at Langebrück near Dresden in 1919, aged 66.

== Oeuvre ==
His works include Das Meer, Op. 31, a symphony for orchestra, organ, solo voices and men's chorus. His Gloria!, Op. 34 (1904), in six movements, for boy's voice, men's chorus, organ, harps, and very large orchestra occupies a whole evening in performance. His solitary symphony was published 1905 and played on 26 October 1908 at Convent Garten of Hamburg, conducted by Francesco Paolo Neglia. Nicodé wrote other orchestral works, a Romanze for violin and orchestra, two cello sonatas, piano pieces and songs.

He also arranged Chopin's piano solo Allegro de concert, Op. 46, for piano and orchestra. This followed his setting of the piece for two pianos.

The only complete recordings of Das Meer and Gloria! were made in 2013, realised digitally and free by Steffen Fahl in his online-project called "klassik resampled.de" and streamed there among other works of Nicodé.

== Works (selection) ==
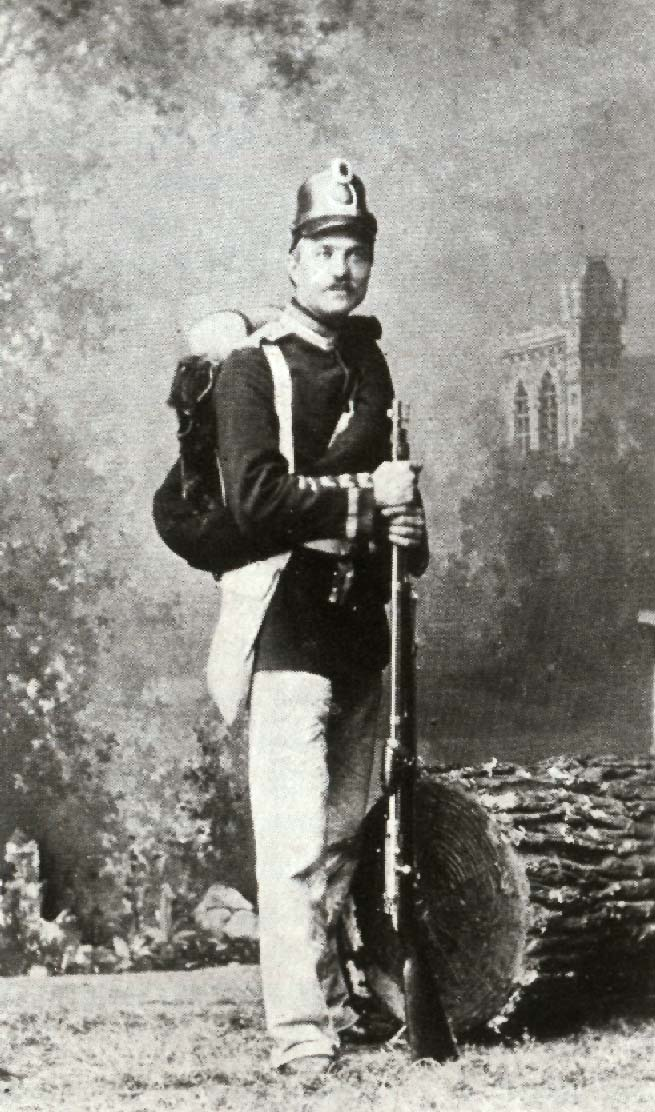
Nicodé as a Reserve officer, 1884

=== Orchestral music ===
- Maria Stuart, Op. 4 (1880)
- Die Jagd nach dem Glück, Op. 11 (1878)
- Romanze für Violine und Orchester, Op. 14
- Symphonische Suite, Op. 17 (1886)
- Jubiläumsmarsch, Op. 20
- Faschingsbilder, Op. 24
- Symphonische Variationen, Op. 27 (dedicated to J.Brahms) (1885)
- Bilder aus dem Süden, Op. 29 (1886)
- Das Meer, symphonic ode after Karl Woermann, Op. 31; includes: 1. Einleitung; 2. Das ist das Meer; 3. Wellenjagd; 4. Meeresleuchten; 5. Fata Morgana; 6. Ebbe und Flut.
- Märchen und Auf dem Lande, Op. 32
- Gloria! Ein Sturm- und Sonnenlied, Symphonie in einem Satze für Grosses Orchester, Orgel und (Schluss-)Chor, Op. 34; includes: 1. Vorverkündigung. Von Werdelust und tausend Zielen; 2. Durch's Feuer, durch die Schmiede; 3. Ein Sonnentag des Glücks; 4. Die stillste Stunde; 5. Um das Höchste; 6. Der neue Morgen.

=== Chamber music ===
- Cello Sonata No. 1 in B minor, Op. 23; movements: 1. Energisch bewegt; 2. Gemächlich; 3. Sehr schnell.
- Cello Sonata No. 2 in G, Op. 25; movements: 1. Allegro amabile; 2. Scherzo (à la Savoyarde). Vivace; 3. Larghetto; 4. Allegro animato.

=== Piano music ===
- Charakteristische Polonaise, Op. 5
- Sechs Phantasiestücke: Andenken an Robert Schumann, Op. 6
- Aphorismen, Op. 8
- Charakterstücke, Op. 9
- Walzer-Capricen, Op. 10
- Etüden, Op. 12
- Italienische Volkslieder und Tänze, Op. 13; includes: 1. Tarantelle; 2. Canzonette; 3. Barcarolle; 4. Saltarello.
- Lieder, Op. 15
- Scherzo fantastique, Op. 16
- Variationen und Fuge über ein Originalthema, Op. 18, after Anton Rubinstein
- Piano Sonata in F minor, Op. 19; movements: 1. Allegro affettuoso; 2. Adagio ("Weihevoll und sehr gebunden vorzutragen"); 3. Menuett. In mässigem Tempo (♩= 92); 4. Rondo. Allegro agitato (Half note.png = 96).
- Etüden, Op. 21
- Ein Liebesleben, Op. 22
- Sonata, B minor, Op. 23
- Sonata G major, Op. 25
- Liederzyklus, Op. 30
- Erbarmen, Op. 33
