= François Bazin (composer) =

French opera composer (1816–1878)

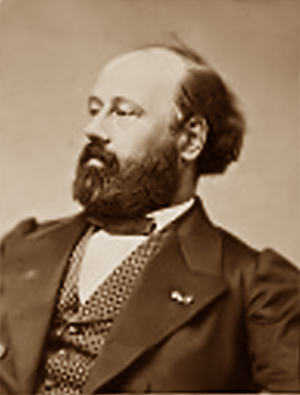
- Born: 4 September 1816; Marseille, France
- Died: 2 July 1878 (aged 61); Paris
- Citizenship: France
- Occupation: Composer

François Emmanuel Joseph Bazin (pronounced [fʁɑ̃.swa ba.zɛ̃]) (4 September 1816 – 2 July 1878) was a well-known French opera composer active during the nineteenth century.

== Biography ==
Born in Marseille, Bazin was a student of Daniel Auber at the Conservatoire de Paris. After completing his education there and returning from his trip to Italy in 1844, Bazin later taught harmony at the Conservatoire. He was succeeded by his own student Émile Durand.

At age 23, Bazin's cantata Loyse de Montfort won the 1840 Prix de Rome. Le Voyage en Chine, which premiered at the Opéra-Comique in Paris, is his best-known composition, and continued to be staged well into the 20th century. Although his many light operas were popular during his lifetime, they are rarely staged today. A handful of arias are still occasionally performed, including "Je pense à vous" from Maître Pathelin, recorded by Roberto Alagna.

Bazin died at age 61 in Paris.

== Works ==
=== Opéras comiques ===
- Le Trompette de Monsieur le Prince (Joubert and Mélesville), 1846
- Le Malheur d'être jolie (Desnoyers), 1847
- La Nuit de la Saint-Sylvestre (Mélesville and M. Masson), 1849
- Madelon (Sauvage), 1852
- Maître Pathelin (de Leuven and Langlé), 1856
- Les Désespérés (de Leuven and Langlé), 1858
- Marianne (Augustin Challamel) (unperformed)
- Le Voyage en Chine (Alfred Delacour and Eugène Labiche), 1865
- L'Ours et le pacha (Scribe and Saintine), 1870

== See also ==
For Bazin's other pupils, See: List of music students by teacher: A to B#François Bazin.

== Bibliography ==
- David Charlton, "Bazin, François (Emmanuel-Joseph)", in: Sadie, Stanley (ed.), The New Grove Dictionary of Opera, vol. 1 (A–D) (New York: MacMillan, 1994), ISBN 0-935859-92-6.
