= Henry Ibbot Field =

English classical pianist

Henry Ibbot Field (6 December 1797 – 19 May 1848), was an English classical pianist.

Field was born at Bath on 6 December 1797, was the son of Thomas Field, for many years the organist at Bath Abbey, by his wife, Mary Harvey, who died 15 June 1815. The father died 21 December 1831. Henry was the eldest of a family of seven children. He was educated first at Holdstock's Academy, and afterwards at the Bath Grammar School. At a very early age he showed his aptitude for music. He was taught by his father, and afterwards by James Morris Coombs, the organist of Chippenham. In 1807, being then just ten years of age, he performed for the first time in public, in a duet with his father. On 15 June 1830 he played with Johann Hummel, in the latter's Grand Sonata, op. 92. He was a virtuoso performer, and known throughout his career as a musical instructor. He was popular in his native city, and generally known as 'Field of Bath'.

Field was an acquaintance of Charles-Valentin Alkan, and played the premiere of the latter's 'Second Concerto da camera', which was dedicated to him, at Bath in 1834 during Alkan's first visit to England.

He was a good scholar in French, Italian, Spanish, and German. While working as teacher of music at Prior Park College, Field in 1835 was converted to Catholicism by the Rev. Dr. Gentili. He was formally received into that church by Bishop Baines during the winter of that year. He gave his last concert on 13 May 1848, in the Bath Assembly Rooms. Whilst playing Wallace's Cracovienne he was suddenly struck down by a paralytic seizure. He died on 19 May 1848, aged 50, at the house of his brother Frederick, the surgeon, in Northumberland Buildings, Bath.
