= Tomasz Napoleon Nidecki =

Polish composer & conductor

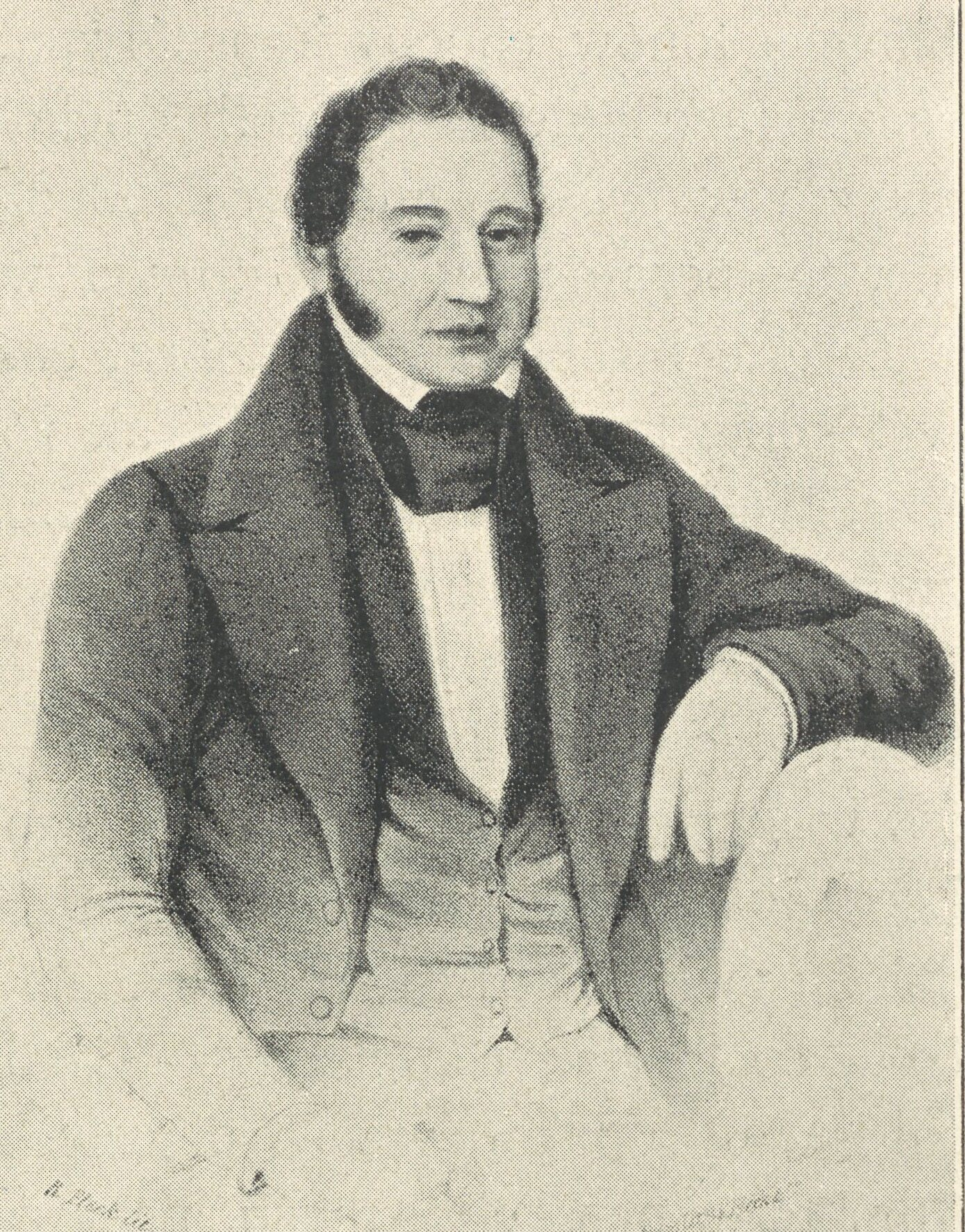
Tomasz Napoleon Nidecki

Tomasz Napoleon Nidecki (January 2, 1807, in Studzianka, near Radom – June 5, 1852, in Warsaw) was a Polish composer, conductor and teacher.

== Biography ==
He studied composition with Józef Elsner between 1824 and 1827 at the Warsaw School for Music and Dramatic Art and Higher School of Music, thus making him a classmate of Frédéric Chopin. According to Eugeniusz Szulc via Halina Goldberg's book Music in Chopin's Warsaw (272), Chopin and Nidecki were both chorus or orchestra members of the Lutheran Holy Trinity Church, Warsaw. During his second visit to Vienna, Chopin met Nidecki, who was studying there between 1828 and 1831. In 1833, Nidecki became director of Theater in der Leopoldstadt. In 1838 he returned to Warsaw and in 1840 took over the directorship from Karol Kurpinski at the Grand Theatre, Warsaw.

== Works ==
=== Works for piano ===
- Polonaise sur des thèmes favoris de l'opéra 'Le Postillon de Longjumeau'
- Mazur z tematów opery 'Koń spiżowy'
- Romance
- Rondo

=== Works for orchestra ===
- Marsz uroczysty wykonany podczas przeniesienia Obrazu Świętej Weroniki
- Polonaise sur des Motifs de l'Opéra Le Brasseur de Preston
- Polonaise à Grand Orchestre exécutée le 27 Mai / 8 Juin 1846 au Théatre de l'Orangerie à Łazienki
- Marsz żałobny (Funeral March) for brass band and choir
- Polonez i hymn Lwowa "Boże Cesarza chroń"
- Overture według melodramatu 'Das Mädchen von Gomez Arias' by A. Schumacher

=== Vocal and instrumental ===
- Mass No. 1 for Four Voices ułożona dla Uczniów Gimnazjum Realnego na sopran, alt, tenor i bas z towarzyszeniem orkiestry
- Veni Creator (cantata)
- Salve Regina
- Ave Maria

=== Operettas ===
- Die Kathi von Hollabrunn, 3 acts
- Schneider, Schlosser und Tischler, 3 acts
- Der Waldbrand oder Jupiters Strafe, 2 acts
- Der Schwur bei den Elementen oder Das Weib als Mann, 3 acts
- Versöhnung, Wohltätigkeit und Liebe, 1 act
- Der Traum am Tannenbühl oder Drei Jahre in einer Nacht, 2 acts
- Die Junggesellen-Wirtschaft im Monde, 2 acts
- Der Temperamentenwechsel, 3 acts
- Der Geist der düstern Inseln oder der Spiegel der Zukunft, 2 acts

=== Songs ===
- Hulanka. Mazur do śpiewania lub na pianoforte
- Das Grab, words by Johann Gaudenz Salis-Seewis
