= Mark Latimer =

English pianist

Mark Latimer is an English pianist who became a professor of music at the London College of Music at age 18.

== Life and career ==
His repertoire consists of over 75 performed piano concertos, including the mammoth Concerto for Piano and Chorus by Busoni and the Alkan Concerto for Solo Piano, of which he made the first live recording. He is also a composer and has had numerous works performed and recorded.

He performed Rachmaninoff's 3rd piano concerto at the age of 12 and Rachmaninoff's 3rd and Prokofiev's 2nd piano concertos at the age of 16, shortly followed by a performance of both piano concertos by Brahms (No. 1, No. 2).

He is also known for his performances of pieces by lesser known composers such as Sorabji, Reger, Honegger, Lambert and others. As well as piano he has also recorded a number of organ works including an hour-long organ and prepared piano CD Zeitgeist, which is completely improvised. An ongoing series of "Take" jazz CDs have been recorded, alongside his own suite, "Exhibitionist at the Pictures".

== Discography ==
- Variations and Fugues - Max Reger - Warner Classics - ASIN: B0002VE20Q
- Zeitgeist - Latimer - Munitions Factory
- Concerto for Solo Piano - Charles Valentin Alkan - APR - ASIN: B000065AI9
- Take #1 - Various - Spotlite - ASIN: B000056P18
- Unhinged Take #2 - Various - Spotlite - ASIN: B00006AGBB
- Smooth Jazz For A Rainy Day - Various
