= Napoléon Alkan =

French composer and music teacher

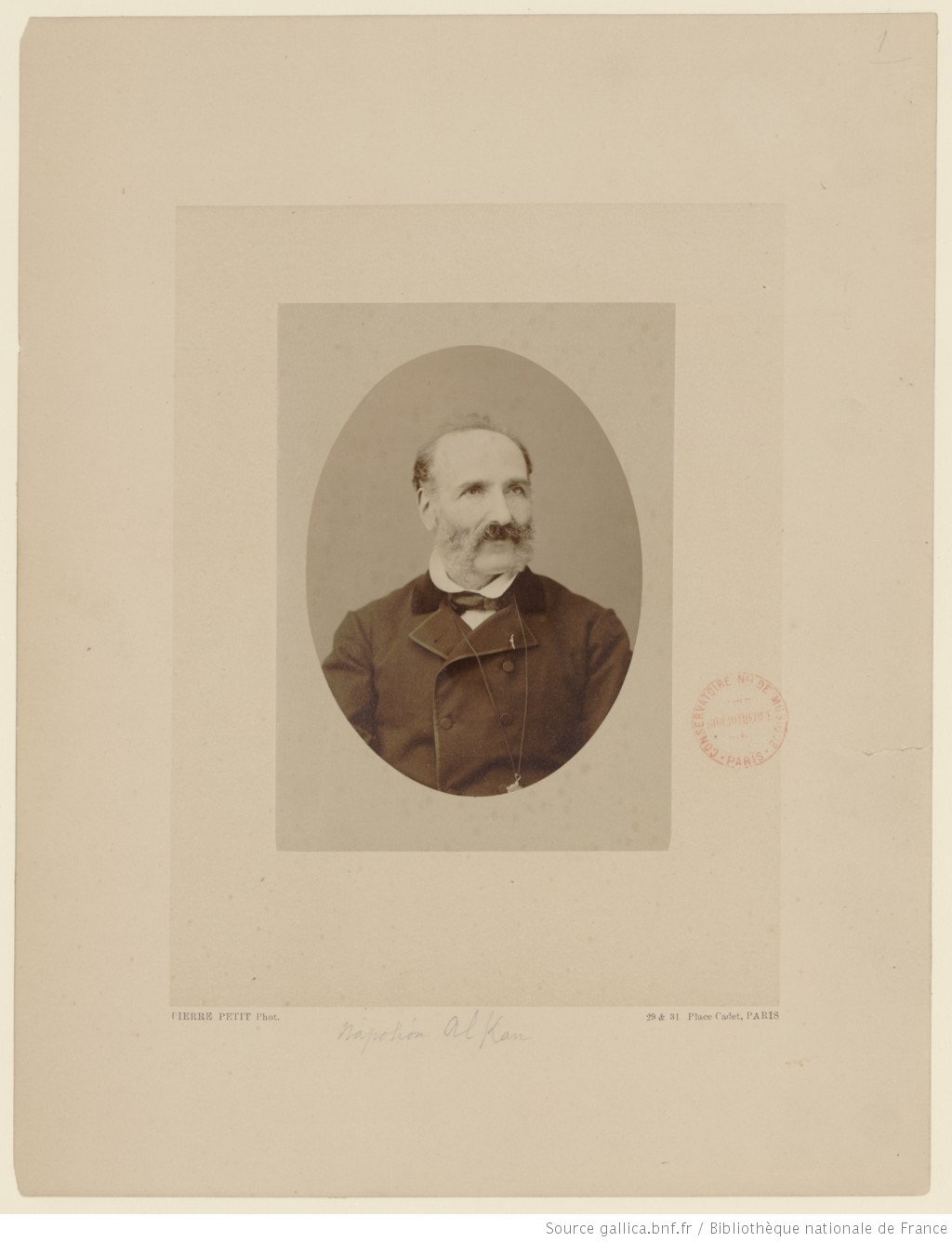
Napoléon Alkan (photograph by Pierre Petit)

Napoléon Alexandre Alkan, born Napoléon Alexandre Morhange (2 February 1826 – August 1906), was a French composer and music teacher.

== Career ==
Alkan was born in Paris, one of six children of Alkan Morhange and Julie Abraham. The family was Jewish, and Alkan Morhange ran a successful music school. All of the Morhange children adopted their father's name as their surname, and all successfully attended the Conservatoire de Paris. Céleste Alkan (married surname Mayer-Marix) (25 February 1811 – 1891) began her training at the Conservatoire at the age of seven and won first prize in solfège at the age of eleven. Charles-Valentin Alkan (1813–1888), the most distinguished of the siblings, became a well-known composer and piano virtuoso. Ernest Alkan (11 July 1816 – 1876) was a student of Jean-Louis Tulou and became known as a flutist. Maxime Alkan (28 May 1818 – 1891) wrote popular music including dances for piano. The youngest of the siblings was Gustave Alkan (24 March 1827 – 1882).

Napoléon became a student at the Conservatoire in 1835 where he studied piano with Pierre Zimmermann, organ with François Benoist and counterpoint and fugue with Adolphe Adam. In 1843 he won first prize for piano at the Conservatoire. From 1845 he taught at the Conservatoire as a repetiteur for solfège. In 1850 he won the Second Grand Prix in the Prix de Rome with the cantata Emma et Eginhard based on a poem by Anne Bignan.

In June 1857, he taught in the class of military students, then from April 1866 was tenured as associate professor of solfeggio. He retained this position until 1 October 1896, when he retired at the age of 70. In 1895 he was made a Chevalier of the Légion d'honneur. He died in Paris aged 80, leaving a daughter, Emma Liernut. He composed a number of original piano works and piano transcriptions of works by classical composers such as Mozart and Haydn.

== Bibliography ==
- Brigitte and François Luguenot François-Sappey: Charles-Valentin Alkan (Paris: Bleu Nuit, 2013); ISBN 978-2-35884-023-1.
