= Francesco Libetta =

Italian pianist, composer and conductor (born 1968)

- Born: October 16, 1968; Galatone, Salento, Province of Lecce, Italy
- Citizenship: Italian
- Education: "T. Schipa" Conservatory
- Website: libetta.it

Francesco Libetta (born 16 October 1968) is an Italian pianist, composer, writer and conductor.

== Biography ==
Born in Galatone, Southern Italy, Francesco Libetta studied music in Italy (piano with Vittoria De Donno; counterpoint with Cosimo Colazzo and Igino Ettorre; composition with Gino Marinuzzi; conducting with Alberto Maria Giuri) and in France (composition with Jacques Castérède). He moved to Lecce, where he has taught Chamber Music at the "T. Schipa" Conservatory.

Described as a "poet-aristocrat of the keyboard with the profile and the carriage of a Renaissance prince" (M. Gurewitsch, New York Times), he first came to the attention of piano cognoscenti after his live performance of 53 Studies by Godowsky based on the 27 Studies by Chopin. Performances included: 1990 in Galatina; then 1994/95 in Milan; Naples, Florence; 2006 in Milan; 2010 one day in Brasília. Libetta's repertoire now encompasses a very wide range, including all of Beethoven's 32 piano sonatas (performed first in Italy, 1993/94), several Mozart and Beethoven concertos, the complete Handel and Chopin works, as well as major works by Schubert, Schumann, Debussy, and Ravel.

He is active as a conductor (in symphonic repertoire, as well as collaborating with the Balletto del Sud in major Tchaikovsky ballets). He is also a composer. His works include three piano concertos, symphonic pieces, electronic music, and ballet and movie scores. His writings include historical and aesthetic essays.

In 2005 he had a short role in Franco Battiato's movie Musikanten, on Beethoven's life.

In 2009, his first opera was premiered. Ottocento ("Eight Hundred", about 800 victims of religious war in South Italy in 1480) was performed in Otranto and Rome. John Ardoin declared that among the new generation of pianists, Francesco Libetta is "the most inspired and creative".

One of his DVDs, with the recording of a recital held at the Festival de La Roque-d'Anthéron (France), created by Bruno Monsaingeon, was awarded the Diapason d'Or and the "CHOC" of Le Monde de la musique.

Critics have praised his qualities: ". . .elegance and charm, (...), with a hint, a touch of aristocratic frivolity that we did not think we would ever witness again." (F. M. Colombo - Corriere della Sera); ". . . a breadth of knowledge that extends far beyond the world of music and the piano repertoire." (A. Mandelli - PianoTime); ". . . such miraculous virtuosity and such a delicate feel for melody that one cannot help wondering whether any other artist of his generation - whether in Italy or elsewhere - can be compared to him." (P. Isotta - Corriere della Sera).

He was Artistic Director of the Miami Piano Festival in Lecce (a summer festival which brings to Lecce musicians, professors and students from all over the world since July 2003) and of the Michelangeli Festival in Rabbi. He has published essays on history and aesthetics, including music by Renaissance composers, reconstructions of Madrigals, cultural life in the late eighteenth century, etc.

== Discography ==
=== DVD ===
- Nireo (2011). Libetta in Palazzo Biscari (regista: Franco Battiato), Beethoven, Strauss, Battiato, Liszt
- Nireo. DVD 101
- Sony Pictures (2006). Musikanten (regista: Franco Battiato), Sony DVD 92220.
- NAÏVE. Les Pianos de la Nuit (2003). Piano recital in La Roque d’Anthéron (regista: Bruno Monsaingeon), Strauss, Liszt, Debussy, Cajkovskij, Ligeti, Hummel, Alkan, Saint-Saëns, Chopin-Godowsky, Delibes. DVD DR 2101.
- Libetta in Lecce, Piano recital (2002). Beethoven, Delibes, Chaminade, Schubert-Godowsky, Ravel, Chopin, Brahms, Debussy, Saint-Saëns/Godowsky. VAI DVD 4225
- DVD Ideale Audience International - MIRARE (2002). Camille Saint-Saëns, Claude Debussy, Leo Delibes (+ Berezowsky, Lugansky, Kocsis, etc.)
- Master of the keyboard - Miami International Piano Festival (2001). Godowsky: Igniis Fatuus; Saint-Saëns: Etude en forme de valse, Op. 52 n. 6; Schubert/Strauss: Kuppelwieser Walzer. VAI - VHS 69230

=== Albums ===
C&Co New Recording (2025) De musica sive de humana phantasia in twelve volumes

Sony Classical CD (2025) The hidden room (with Aylen Pritchin, Luigi Piovano, Grazia Raimondi)

Sony Music CD (2024) Chopin selon Chopin

Sony Classical CD (2023) Lighting Bosso

NIREO 013. Tradizioni musicali a Nardò (2011). Libetta: Sonata per violino e pianoforte (with Aylen Pritchin, vl), LAD. A. Scarlatti: two Intonazioni. N. Fago: Toccata. [+ Anonimo, Bove, De Cupertinis, Manfroci, San Pier di Negro, Serafico]

NIREO 040. Da Bach a Battiato (2010). Bach, Battiato, Gesualdo, Lulli, Martini, Pasquini, Rameau, Rossi, Turini, Vento, Zipoli

NIREO 012. Libetta: Musiche per Bene (2010). With: Maria Luisa Bene, ensemble and electronic.

MARSTON (4 cd). A Century of Romantic Chopin (2010). Chopin: Nocturne Op. 27 n. 2 [+ Josef Hofmann, Sergei Rachmaninoff, Ferruccio Busoni, Moritz Rosenthal, Ignace Jan Paderewski, Ignaz Friedman, Alfred Cortot, Francis Planté, Béla Bartók, Claudio Arrau, Guiomar Novaes, Vladimir de Pachmann, Solomon, Arthur Rubinstein, Emil Gilels, Vladimir Horowitz, Jorge Bolet, and others.]

NIREO 011. Eriberto Scarlino: Composizioni per pianoforte e da camera (2008). Scarlino: Fiaba, Improvviso, Aria, Scherzo, Due Studi da concerto, Cantilena, Minuetto, Berceuse, Piccolo Valzer, Serenatina, Improvviso, Canzoncina nostalgica, Notturno

NIREO 010. Francesco D'Avalos: Composizioni per pianoforte (2008). Vergangliche Bilder Albumblatter und Variationen Albumblatt - Variazione di una variazione - 13 Preludi (1840–1900) - Notturno - Piccola Romanza - Foglio d’Album - Minuetto - Paysages marines - 2 Pezzi caratteristici (Le Marionette suonano e ballano, Veli neri e bianchi ballano nella notte) - Valzer

NIREO 007. Libetta live in Fort Lauderdale (2005). Mozart, (Variations in F Major, K. 398); Beethoven (Sonata Op. 27, No. 2); Chopin (Nocturne, Op. 27, No. 2) Liszt (Canzone and Tarantella from Années de Pélerinage); Schumann (Albumblatt); Cajkovskij-Liszt (Polonaise); Alfano (Se taci); Trabaci (Toccata); Leo-Libetta (Canzone a dispetto); Friedman-Gartner (Wiener Tanze).

NIREO 006. Czerny - Musiche per pianoforte a sei mani (2009). Czerny: Variazioni su Bellini Op. 295, Rondo Op. 227, Fantasia su Mozart Op. 741, Grand Pot-pourri Op. 84, Overture da Le Nozze di Figaro di Mozart, Sinfonia da Tancredi di Rossini. With: Alessandro Mandurino, Luigi Nicolardi, Renato Rizzello, Scipione Sangiovanni, Vanessa Sotgiu.

NIREO 003/5 (3 CDs). Liszt: 12 Symphonic Poems for Two Pianos (2005). With : Matteo Cistemino, Lara Escelsior, Giuliano Graniti, Luigi Nicolardi, Valentina Parentera, Renato Rizzello, Scipione Sangiovanni, Vanessa Sotgiu.

NIREO (2005). 001/2(2 CDs). Pozzoli: Studi di media difficoltà (Studies of moderate difficulty), Studi a moto rapido (Studies in fast motion), and Studi sulle note ribattute (Studies on repeated notes), Riflessi del mare (Reflections on the Sea).

VAI (2004). VAIA 1241. Czerny: Studies Op. 740

VAI (2004). VAIA 1242. Mussorgsky (Pictures at an Exhibition, Hopak), Balakirev (Sonata)

VAI (2003). Libetta Plays Beethoven AUDIO VAIA 1208. Beethoven: Variazioni Diabelli, Variazioni Op. 34

Tactus - TC:841905 (2007). Sgambati: Sinfonia n. 1, op. 16; Maestoso (Marcia Funebre); Die Ideale (Liszt)

Accademia Classics - AC 502.2 (2CD). Franz Liszt: The Complete piano Transcription.

VAI (2003). Piano duos. AUDIO VAIA 1212. Mozart, Libetta, Rimsky-Korsakov/Libetta (with Pietro De Maria); Liszt (with Kemal Gekic); Rachmaninov (with Ilya Itin)

VAI (2002). AUDIO VAIA 1206. Masters of the Keyboard Vol. 2. (+ A. Neiman, N. Angelich, D. Burstein, I. Itin, P. De Maria). Debussy (Le Colline d’Anacapri), Strauss-Risler (Till Eulenspiegel), Brahms-Cortot (Wiegenlied)

VAI (2001) - VAIA 1196. Respighi (Due Danze Italiane), Gesualdo (Canzone Francese), Godowsky (Due Studi su Chopin), Ravel (La Valse), Debussy (Estampes), Wagner/Liszt (O du, mein holder abendstern), Gounod/Liszt (Valzer da "Faust"), Saint-Saëns (Etude en forme de Valse), etc.

MPF (2000) - (2 CD). Alkan (Grande Sonate Op. 33, I mov.), etc. (+ others)

Danacord (2000) - DANACOCD 559. Godard (Mazurka n. 4 Op. 103) (+ others)

Chandos (2000) - CHAN 9820. Eisler (Die Mutter) - with E. Arciuli, D. Fasolis, RTSI Choir.

Agorà (1999) - AG 175.2 (2CD). Liszt (Integrale delle trascrizioni da opere di Wagner)

Agorà (1999) - AG 168.1. Platti (Sonate XIII-XVIII)

Agorà 1999. Canzoni di Cesare Andrea Bixio. Con Ernesto Palacio

AIG (1998) - AIG 1097. Chopin: Due Notturni Op.27, Scherzo Op. 31, Studi Op. 10 nn. 3,5,10,12, Studi Op. 25 nn. 2,8,9,12, Valzer Op. 34 n. 2, Impromptu Op. 66, Polacca Op. 53

Eventyr (1998). Libetta (Le candide), Monpou (Cancion VI), Wagner (Brautlied aus Lohengrin)

Agorà (1997) - AG 115.1. Liszt: Trascrizioni da opere italiane e francesi. Rigoletto, La muta di Portici, Guglielmo Tell, Roberto il diavolo, Sonnambula, Faust

Eventyr (1995) - LC 01. Schubert (Momento musicale, Kuperwieser Waltzer), Mendelssohn (Romanze senza parole Op. 62 n. 6, Op. 67 n. 4), Beethoven (Sonata Op. 78), Mozart (Adagio KV 617a), Hummel (Rondo favori Op. 11), Raff (Le Fileuse), etc.

Promusica Norway (1992) - PCC 9031. Ligeti (Etudes, Prèmier Livre I-V)

Promusica Norway (1992) - PCC 9030. Sinding (Serenate Op. 33 n. 4) Cleve (Etude Op. 17 n. 2)

=== Albums (LPs) ===
Sony Classical LP (2025) The hidden room (con Aylen Pritchin, Luigi Piovano, Grazia Raimondi)

Sony Classical LP (2023) Lighting Bosso

ETERFON (1990) RR 141 Putignano (Tendre, Dulcissime, Parvenze)

== Works ==
=== Stage ===
- Venus de Miami (The Creatures of Prosthesis) (ballet) [2019]
- Ottocento - L'Assedio di Otranto [2009], opera
- Duo (ballet) [2001]
- Four Souls (ballet) [2002]
- Musiche per Bene (stage music) [2005]
- Eolitabularia musica (ballet) [2006]

=== Movie music ===
- Sognavo le nuvole colorate, film-documentario di Mario Balsamo - (Oistros) Roma, 2009.

=== Orchestral ===
- Iopa chante sur Degobar [1996 c.]
- Iopa regarde la Nativité [1997 c.]
- 1st concerto for piano and Orchestra [2001 c.]
- 2nd concerto for piano and Orchestra [2002/3]
- 3rd concerto for piano and Orchestra "Concertulum" [2006/7]
- La Valle delle Anime for piano and Orchestra [1999/2008]
- Movimento II [2012]
- Logoi neretinoi [2015]

=== Two pianos ===
- Eolitabularia Musica [1995/2006]
- Fours souls [2002 c.]

=== Piano solo ===
- La chasse [1986]
- Marcia dei seguaci di M. Hanon [1989]
- Trasporto eolico di particellati [1993]
- Touches [1994]
- Strudellied [1995]
- Lenta atonalità diatonica [2011]
- Parafrasi immaginaria sulla Sarazenin di Richard Wagner [2013]
- Stasimo e variazioni dall’Oreste di Euripide [2017]
- Sonata [2020]
- Sonata II [2020]

=== Chamber music ===
- Tre arie da Iopa (voice and piano) [1995 c.]
- Pabassinas (4 hand piano) [1995 c.]
- Varjazsong (flute, sax, piano; or: clarinet, cello, piano) [2000 c.]
- Musiche per Bene [1984/2005]
- Tema di Nuvole Colorate (piano and guitar) [2008]
- Sonata in sol (violin and piano) [2010]

=== Transcriptions ===
Piano solo

- Alfano: Se Taci
- Battiato: 5 pezzi (La Cura, E ti vengo a cercare, Coro da Genesi, I Treni di Touzer, Cerco un centro di gravità permanente)
- Cajkovskij: Pas de deux (Blue Bird) from Belle au Bois dormant
- Gesualdo: 3 Madrigali (Moro ahi lasso, Ardita zanzaretta, Già piansi nel dolore), Gagliarda
- Händel: Passacaglia
- Leo: Canzone a dispetto from Amor vuol Sofferenza
- Paisiello: Inno
- Pizzetti: Preludio from Fedra
- Trabaci: Gagliarda
- Wagner: Aria from Tannhauser

Other

- Brancaccio: Tre romanze (flute and guitar)
- Godowsky III: Il giardino delle delizie terrene (piano and orchestra)
- Kunhau: Hishia agonizzante e risanato (piano 4 hands)
- Joplin: 3 Ragtimes (piano and orchestra)
- Respighi: Antiche arie e danze (flute, harp, piano)
- Rimsky-Korsakov: Sheherazade (two pianos)
- Serafico: Due Madrigali (chamber ensemble and actor)
- Wagner: Overture del Tannhauser (16 pianos 4 hands)
- Waldteufel: Valzer del Diavolo nel Bosco (8 hands)

=== Electronic (Acusmatic) ===
- Studio-Studien-Étude [2000 c.]
- Cinque Studi on Godowsky on Chopin for piano and electronic [2010]
