= Kenneth Hamilton =

Scottish pianist and writer

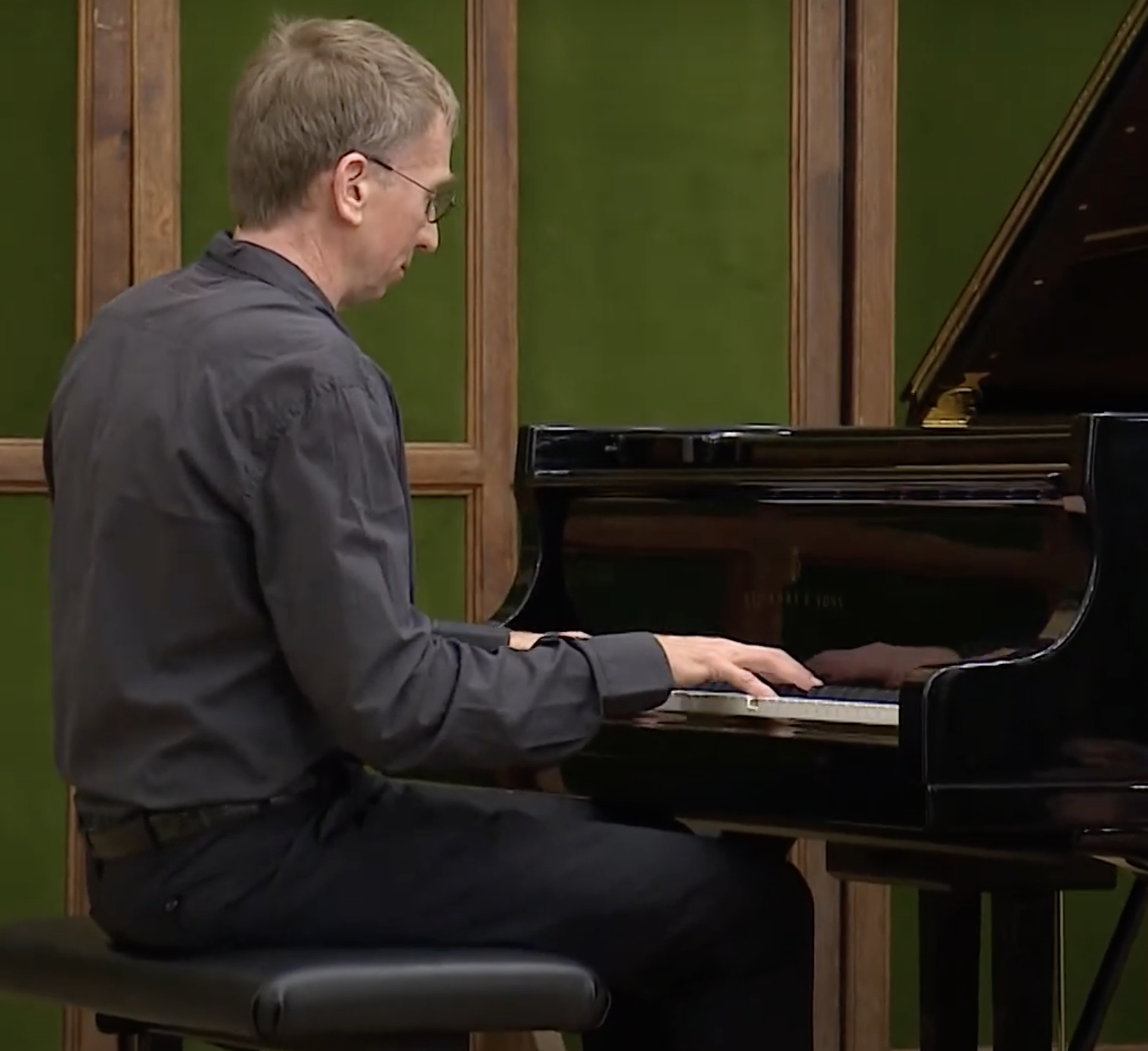
- Hamilton in Budapest, Hungary, 2021
- Born: 1963 (age 62–63); Glasgow, Scotland
- Education: Royal Scottish Academy of Music and Drama; University of Glasgow; Balliol College, University of Oxford
- Occupation: Pianist

Kenneth Hamilton (born 1963) is a Scottish pianist and writer, known for virtuoso performances of Romantic music, especially Liszt, Alkan and Busoni. Hamilton's playing is characterized by spontaneity, technical assurance, and a wide variety of keyboard colour. He was a student of Alexa Maxwell, Lawrence Glover and the Scottish composer-pianist Ronald Stevenson, whose music he champions.

Hamilton lectures on music. He was awarded a doctorate for a dissertation on the music of Liszt by Balliol College, Oxford, where his supervisor was John Warrack. He is the author of Liszt: Sonata in B-minor (Cambridge University Press, 1996) and the editor of The Cambridge Companion to Liszt (Cambridge University Press, 2005). His widely publicised latest book, After the Golden Age: Romantic Pianism and Modern Performance (Oxford University Press, 2008) discusses the differences between the past and the present in concert life and playing styles. Its conclusions have stimulated extensive debate in the musical world.

== Early life ==
Hamilton was born in Glasgow, Scotland in 1963. He attended the Royal Scottish Academy of Music and Drama where his piano teachers were Alexa Maxwell and Lawrence Glover. He later benefitted from the mentorship of Ronald Stevenson, whose music he has had the pleasure of performing and recording.

He is a graduate of the University of Glasgow and of Balliol College, Oxford, where he was taught by Hugh Macdonald and John Warrack. His doctoral dissertation at Balliol was a critical study of the opera fantasias and transcriptions of Franz Liszt.

== Career ==
Hamilton was De Velling Willis Research Fellow at the University of Sheffield, a British Academy Postdoctoral Fellow at Worcester College, Oxford, and a member of the Music Department of the University of Birmingham, before joining Cardiff University School of Music as a professor and head of department from 2014 to 2024.

He has been a guest professor at Shanghai, Zhejiang and Xi'an Conservatories, the Central Conservatory (Beijing) and Peking University in China; The Princess Galyani Institute of Music in Thailand; the Franz Liszt Academy in Hungary, the Saint Petersburg Conservatory in Russia' the Royal Academy of Music in the UK; and the University of Miami in the US. He is a distinguished visiting artist of the International Piano Centre at Xiamen Institute of Technology in China.

Hamilton's recordings on the Prima Facie label cover a host of composers, including Bach, Handel, Mozart, Beethoven, Chopin, Liszt, Alkan, Mendelssohn, Brahms, Busoni, Percy Grainger, Godowsky, Ronald Stevenson, Pedro Faria Gomes and John Casken. Several albums have become best-sellers. Volume 1 of Kenneth Hamilton Plays Liszt: Death and Transfiguration, was a Gramophone best classical album of 2022; Volume 2, Salon and Stage, was the Guardian's best classical recording of 2023.

He is also a Steinway Artist.
