= Bruno Monsaingeon =

French musician, writer and filmmaker

Bruno Monsaingeon (French: [bʁyno mɔ̃sɛ̃ʒɔ̃]; born 5 December 1943) is a French filmmaker, writer, and violinist. He has made a number of documentary films about famous twentieth-century musicians, including Glenn Gould, Sviatoslav Richter, David Oistrakh, Piotr Anderszewski, Yehudi Menuhin, Francesco Libetta, Grigory Sokolov, Maurizio Pollini and David Fray. His interviews with Richter and with Nadia Boulanger have also been published as books.
