= David Fray =

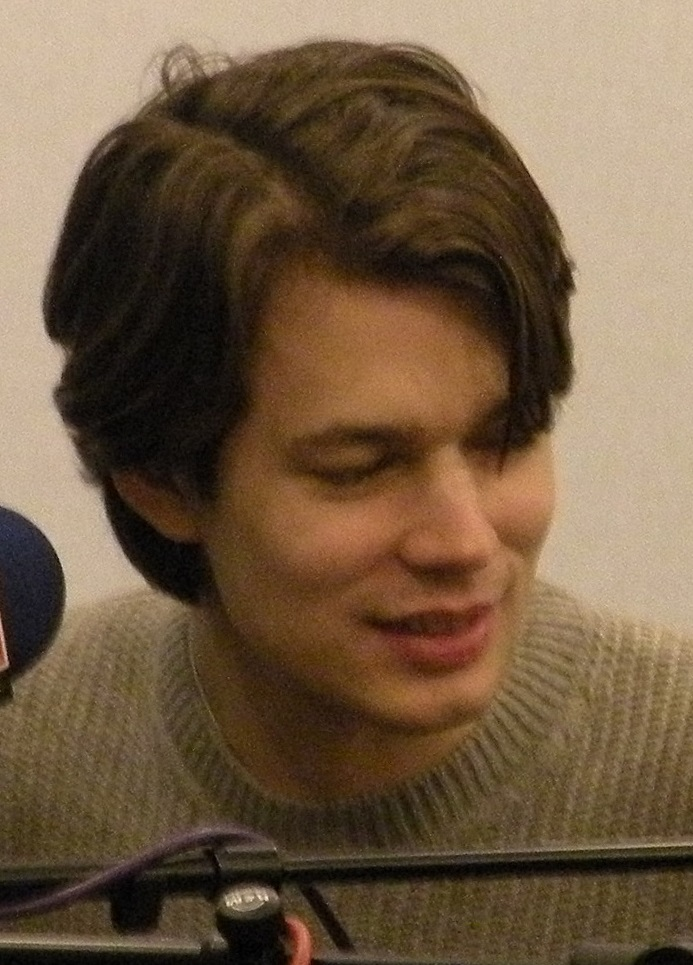
- Fray in 2009

Background information
- Born: 24 May 1981 (age 45); Tarbes, France
- Genres: Classical
- Occupation: Pianist
- Instrument: Piano
- Years active: 2005–present
- Label: Warner/Erato Classics

David Fray (born 24 May 1981) is a French classical pianist. Voted "Newcomer of the Year 2008" by the BBC Music Magazine,

== Biography ==
David Fray was born in Tarbes, near the Pyrenees into a Jewish family. Both his parents are teachers, his father's subject being philosophy and his mother's German.

Fray entered the professional classical music world after receiving the Second Grand Prize at the Montreal International Music Competition in 2004. After this acclaim he released "Schubert, Liszt", a CD compilation of works by the two composers, on the ATMA Classique label. More recently, he has done video recordings of piano concertos by J.S. Bach with the Deutsche Kammerphilharmonie Bremen, as well as Schubert's Wanderer Fantasy during the Festival of La Roque d'Anthéron. In 2008 he released a second CD, "Bach / Boulez Piano Recital", which was another compilation of two composers from separate musical periods. He has performed with many established conductors such as John Axelrod, Kurt Masur, Jaap van Zweden and Christoph Eschenbach.

Fray has won a number of awards, including the "Révélation Classique" (Classical Discovery) from ADAMI, the "Jeune Soliste de l'Année" (Young Soloist of the Year) from the French Language Public Radio Coalition, and the Diploma for Outstanding Merit from the Hamamatsu Competition.

== Personal life ==
In July 2007 Fray married actress Chiara Muti (daughter of conductor Riccardo Muti), with whom he has a daughter.

== Playing style ==
Fray's love of Bach and his playful, idiosyncratic appearance in the ARTE documentary, in which he excitedly bobs his eyebrows, bends low over the piano while seated on a backed chair, hums along with the orchestra, and jokes with his fellow musicians, have caused him to be compared with pianist Glenn Gould. However, Fray's style is radically different from Gould's—it is fluid where Gould's was sharply articulate. Fray has said that he is "not such a fan of Glenn Gould" and that pianist Wilhelm Kempff is an especially important influence: "What I love about his playing is that he makes the piano sing and speak. That is my ultimate goal.”

== Recordings ==
- Schubert: Fantasia in C Major/Lieder Transcriptions/Sonata / David Fray (Atma 2005)
- Bach: Partita in D major; French Suite BWV 812 in B minor / Boulez: Douze Notations pour piano; "Incises" / David Fray (Virgin Classics 2007)
- Bach: Keyboard Concertos BWV 1052, 1055, 1056 & 1058 / David Fray, Die Deutsche Kammerphilharmonie Bremen (Virgin Classics 2008)
- Swing, Sing & Think. David Fray Records J.S. Bach / A film by Bruno Monsaingeon (Virgin Classics DVD 2008)
- Schubert: Impromptus Op.90, Moments Musicaux, Allegretto in C minor / David Fray (Virgin Classics 2009)
- Mozart: Piano Concertos 22 & 25 / David Fray, Philharmonia Orchestra, Jaap van Zweden (Virgin Classics 2010)
- David Fray Records Mozart – Piano Concertos Nos.22 & 25 / A film by Bruno Monsaingeon (Virgin Classics DVD 2011)
- Bach: Partitas Nos. 2 & 6, Toccata BWV 911 / David Fray (Virgin Classics 2013)
- Schubert: Sonata in G D894 ‘Fantasie’, the Hungarian Melody D817, the Fantasia in F minor D940, and the towering Allegro in A minor D947, ‘Lebensstürme’ (‘Storms of Life’) / David Fray, duets with Jacques Rouvier (Virgin Classics 2015)
- Chopin: / David Fray (Erato/Warner Classics 2017)
- Bach: Concertos for 2, 3 & 4 pianos / David Fray (Erato/Warner Classics 2018)
- Bach: Sonatas / Renaud Capucon, David Fray / Erato/Warner Classics 2019)
- Bach: Goldberg Variations (Erato/Warner Classics 2021)
