= Three Obliques (Walk In) =

1968 sculpture by Barbara Hepworth

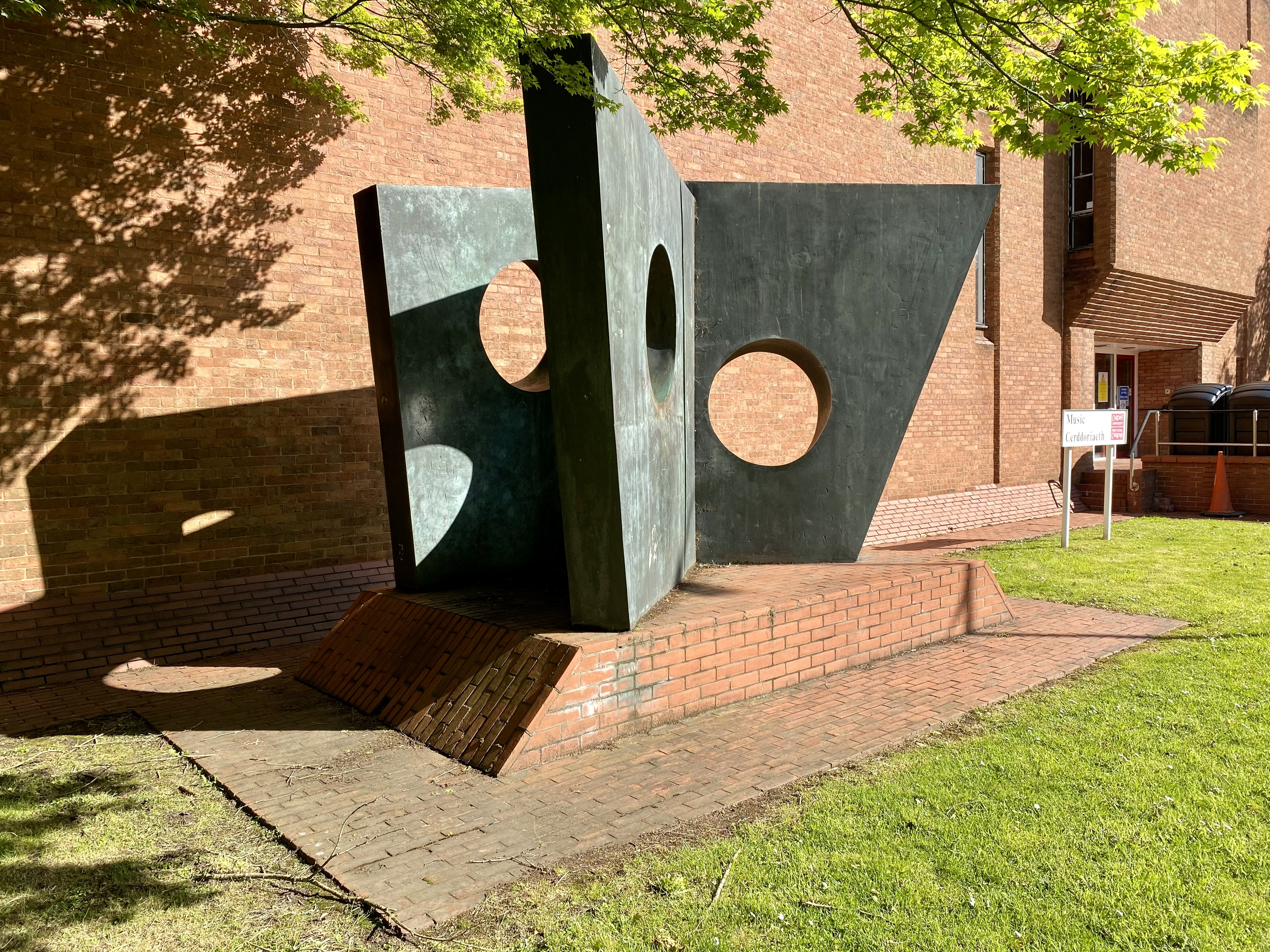
- Three Obliques (Walk In) at the Cardiff University School of Music in May 2021
- Artist: Barbara Hepworth
- Movement: Modernist
- 51.4892°N 3.1834°W

Three Obliques (Walk In) is a 1968 sculpture by Barbara Hepworth. Three casts exist; two are in private collections and a third is displayed outside the Cardiff University School of Music in Cardiff, Wales. It is cast in bronze on a monumental scale.

== Origin and description ==
The sculpture is an abstract piece cast in bronze consisting of three roughly trapezoidal wings, each 3 meters in height. The top of each wing is pierced by an oculus.

The piece originated in Hepworth's 1967 sculpture Three Oblique Forms (February). It was created in a plaster in a version that is now in the Hepworth Wakefield collection of Hepworth's works. It was given to the collection by her daughters. Three Oblique Forms (February) was subsequently made into an edition in bronze of 9. Hepworth subsequently created a bronze edition of Three Oblique Forms (February) in 1970 and created a lithograph Oblique Forms, of the same piece in 1969.

The Sotheby's auction catalogue note for the 2015 sale of one of the casts described the "grandeur and monumentality" of the piece as "mitigated by the large circular holes which pierce the three interlocking sections and invite the viewer to interact with the sculpture". The 'walk in' part of the title of the sculpture is an instruction to the viewer to interact with the piece. Hepworth said in a 1962 interview with The Studio magazine that she felt that through her work "It is easy now to communicate with people through abstraction, and particularly so in sculpture since the whole body reacts to its presence" and that "people become themselves a living part of the work".

Three Obliques (Walk In) is the monumental version of Three Oblique Forms (February), it was created in 1968 in bronze. Hepworth would typically create smaller versions of her monumental pieces; Three Oblique Forms (Walk In) is unusual in that it was created after the smaller piece. The three monumental casts were created by the Morris Singer Foundry in 1969. It was cast in an edition of 2, with one intended as artist's proof. Each one is inscribed Barbara Hepworth with the date 1969. It is listed as BH 473 in Hepworth's catalogue raisonné.

In 1970, one of the casts of Three Obliques (Walk In) was exhibited in the second outdoor sculpture exhibition in Syon Park, London. The sculpture remained on display in the park until 1972.

== Individual casts ==
An edition in the collection of the ExxonMobil Foundation was sold at auction at Sotheby's in New York in 2006 for $1.4 million. The ExxonMobil Foundation had acquired the piece from the London art gallery Gimpel Fils in 1972. The property developer Martin Selig acquired the cast in 2006; it is displayed at 635 Elliott West in the Lower Queen Anne district of Seattle.

One of the casts was donated to the Long Island Jewish Medical Center, in New York; it was acquired from the medical center by a private owner in 2007 before being displayed at Chatsworth House, on the estate of the Dukes of Devonshire prior to its auction by Sotheby's in 2015.

The third cast is displayed outside the Cardiff University School of Music. The Cardiff cast has been listed Grade II by Cadw since October 2010.

== Gallery ==
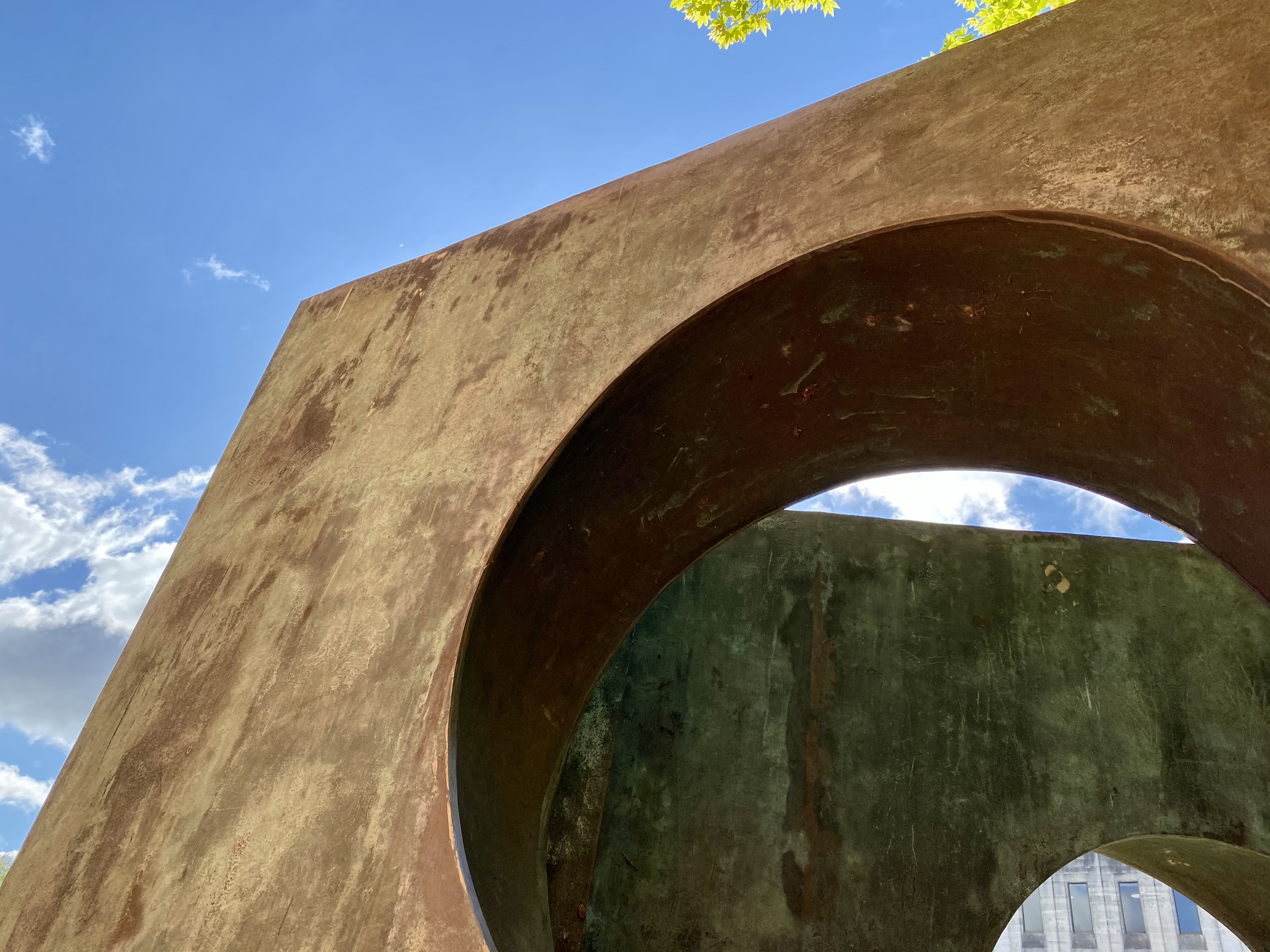

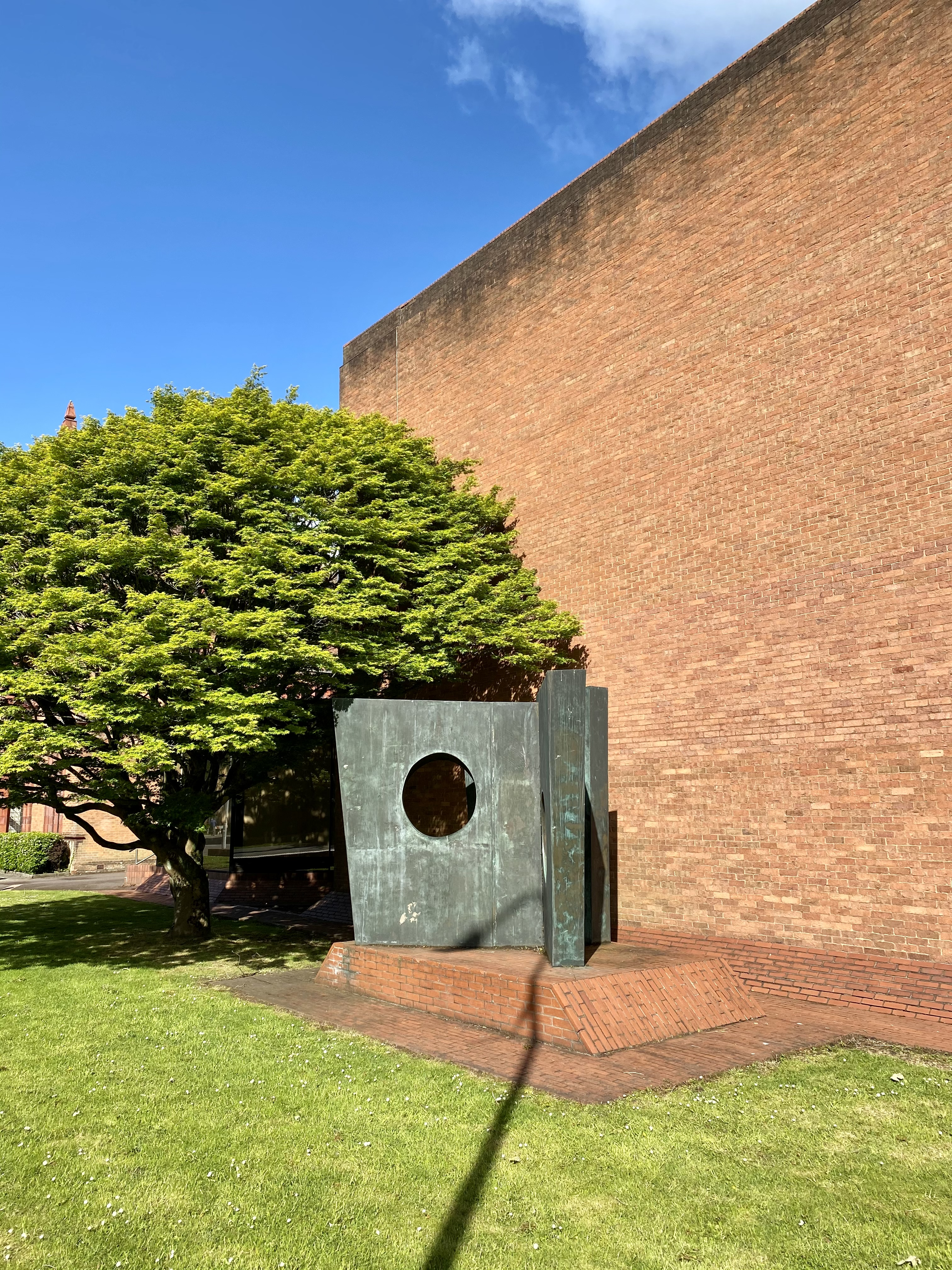

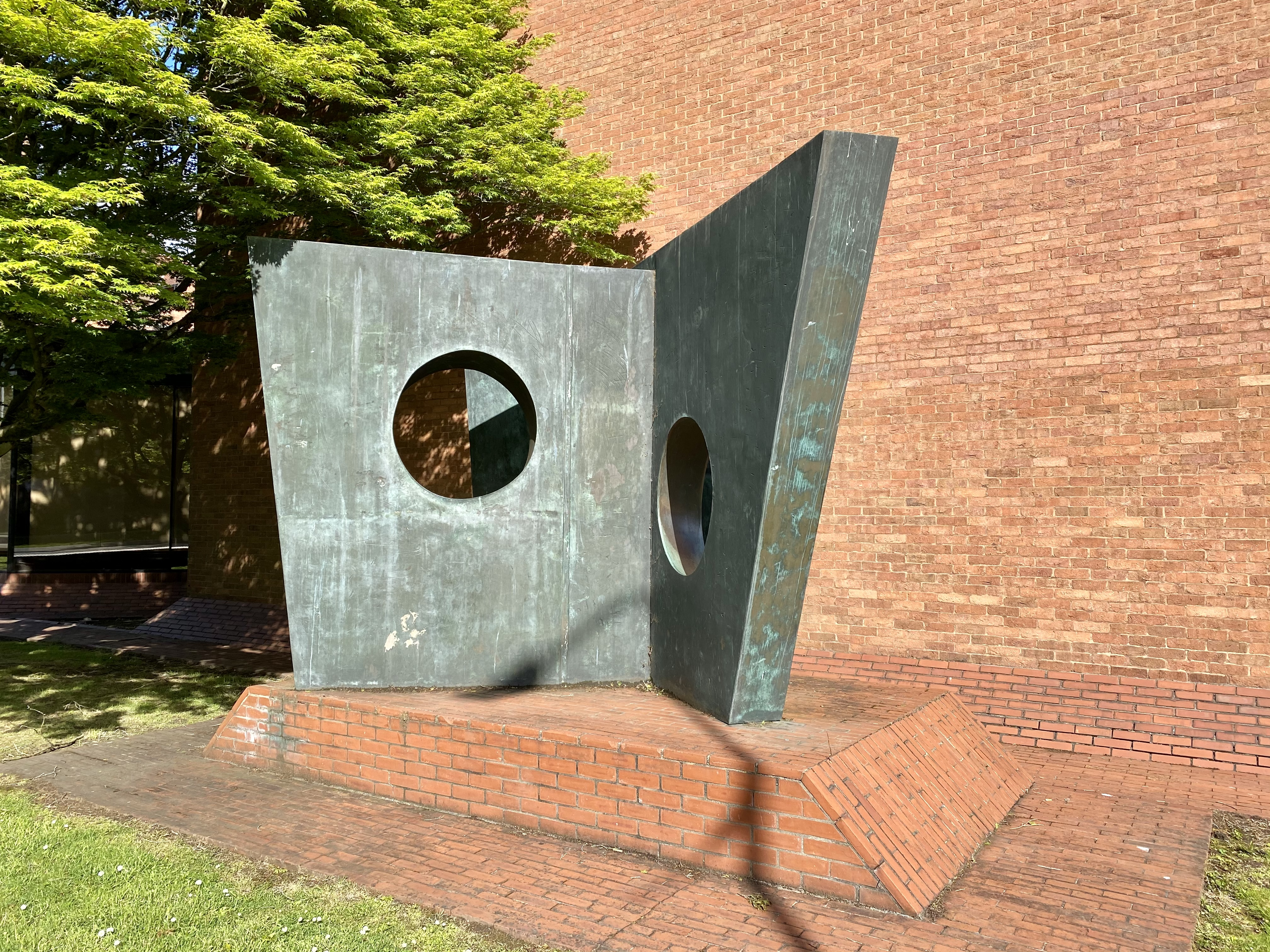

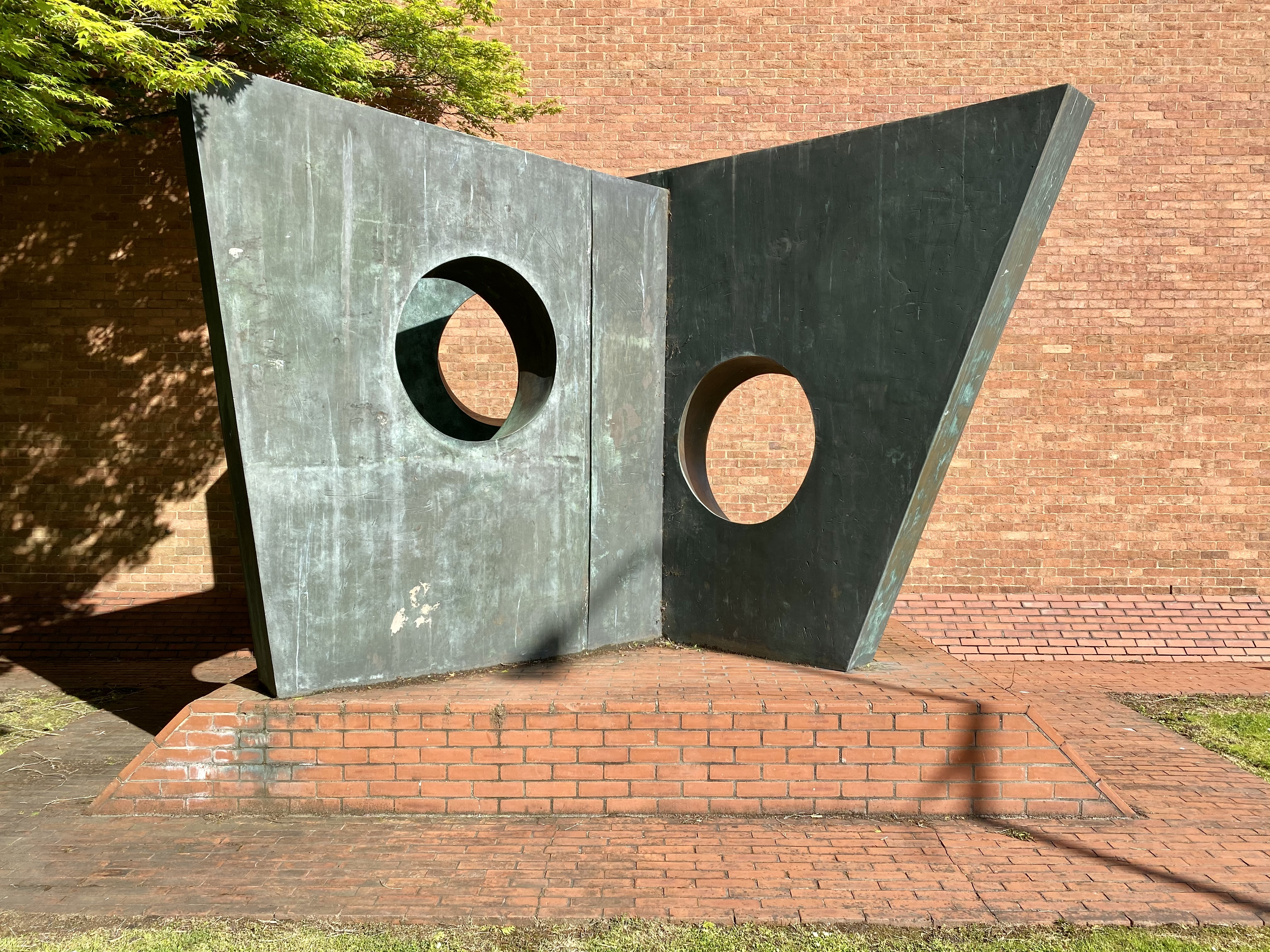

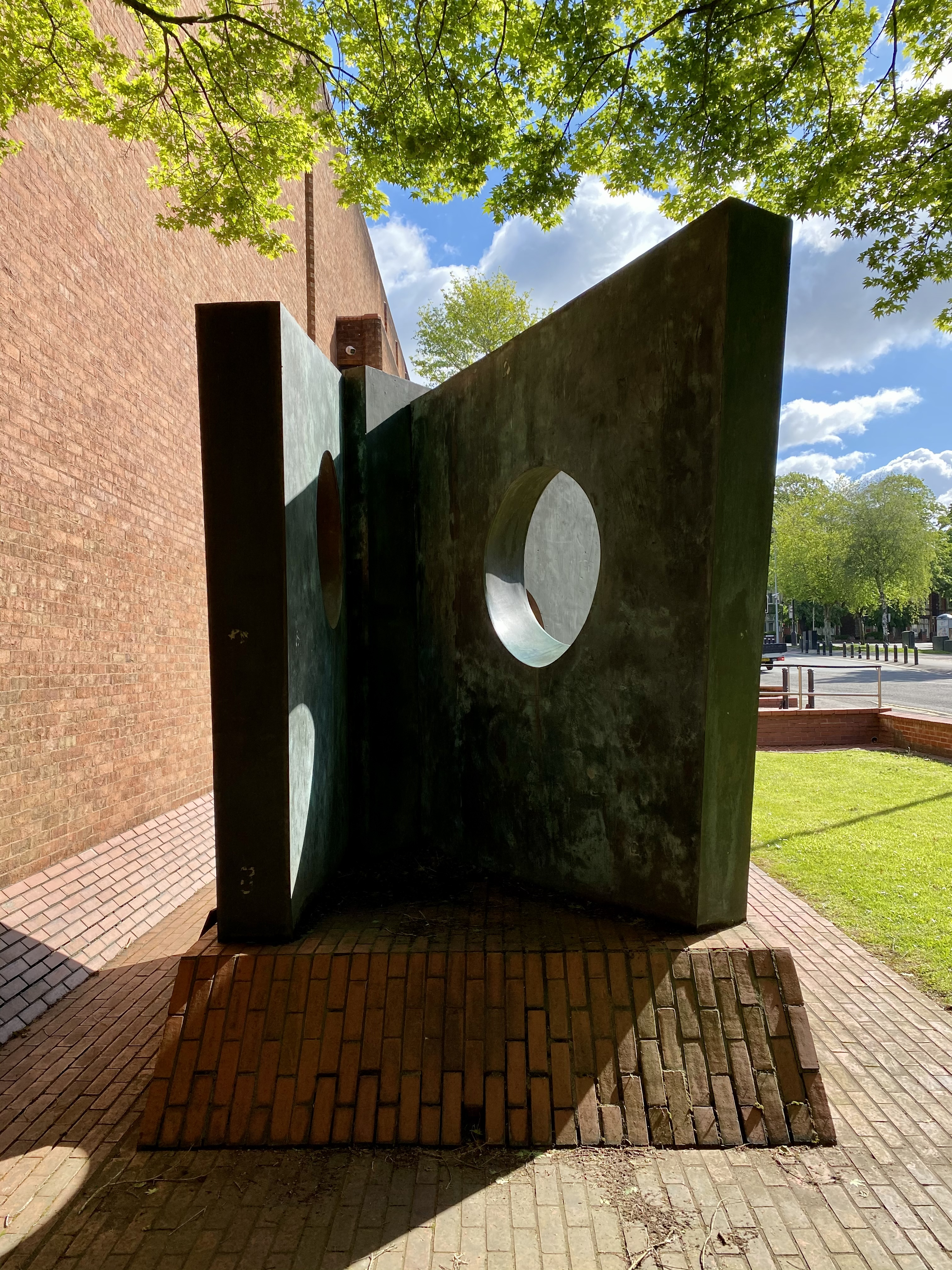

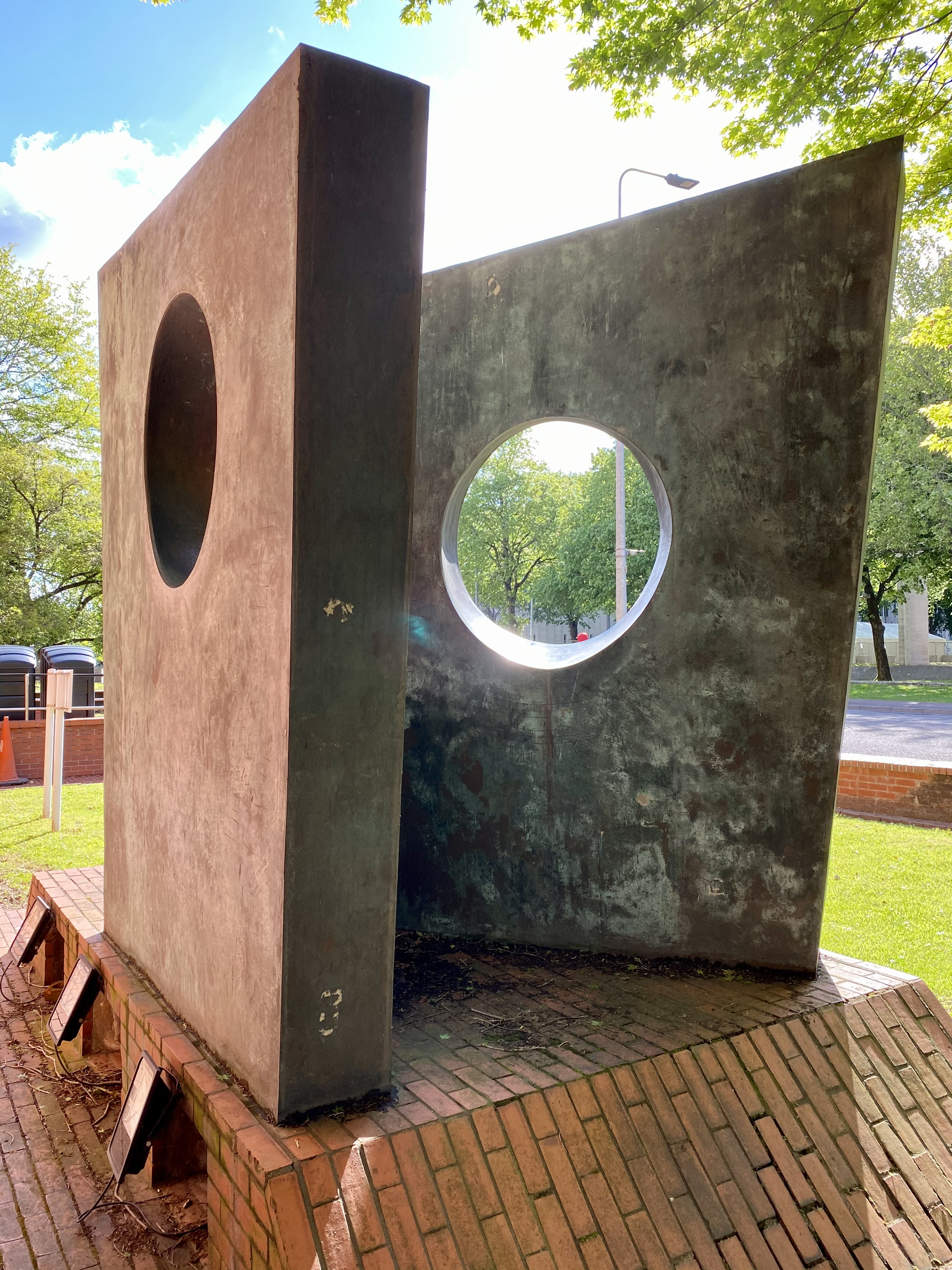

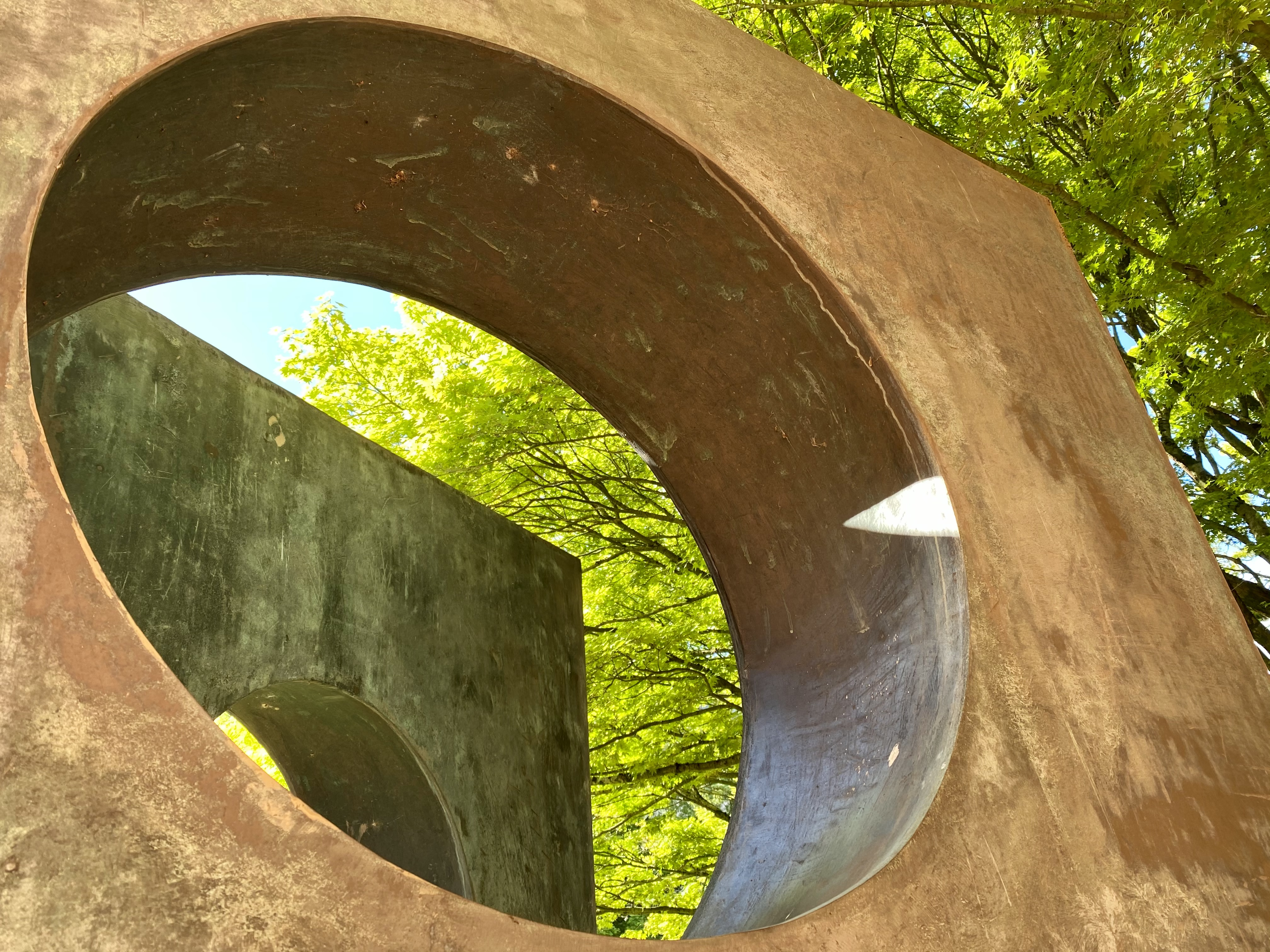

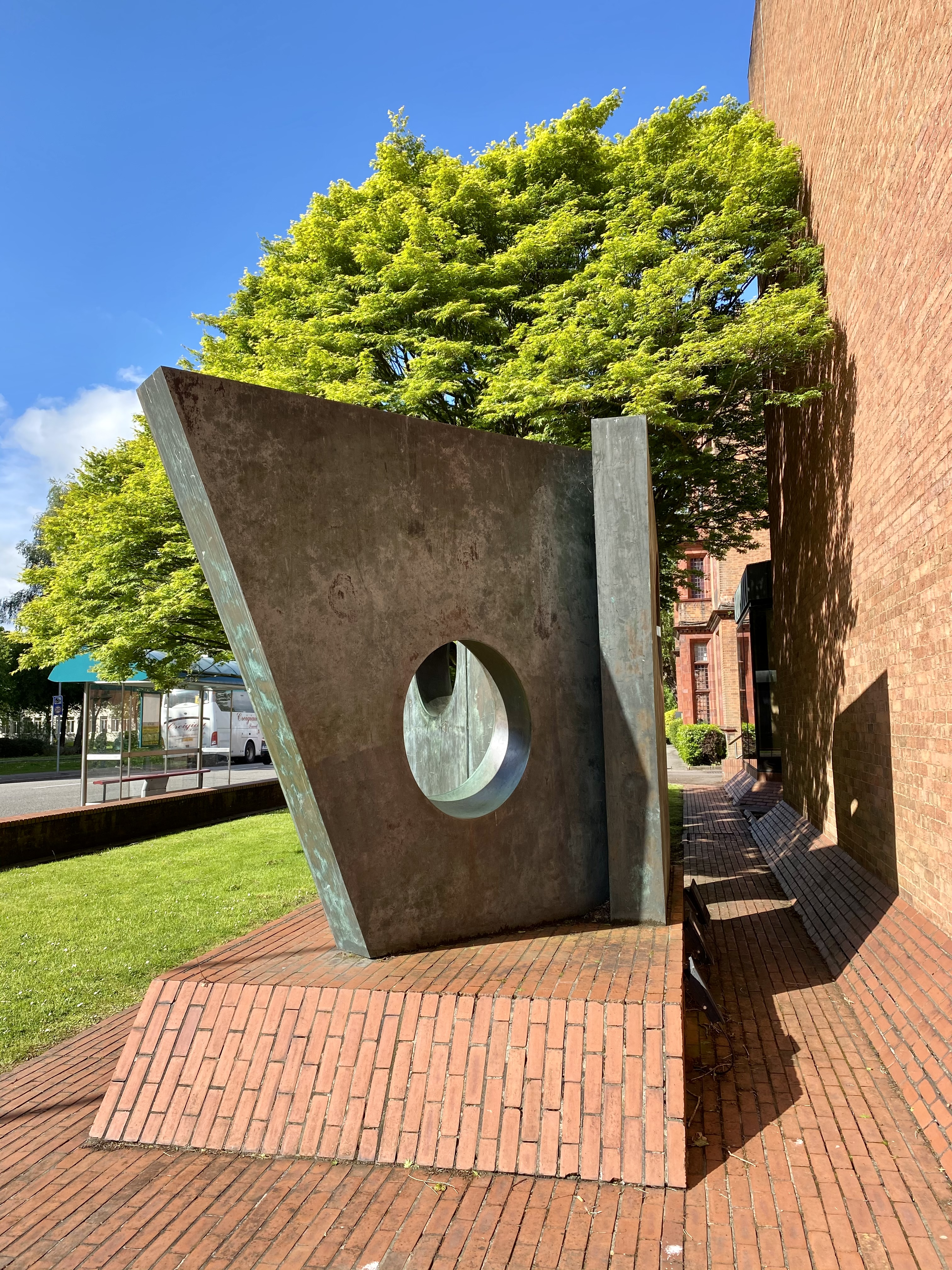

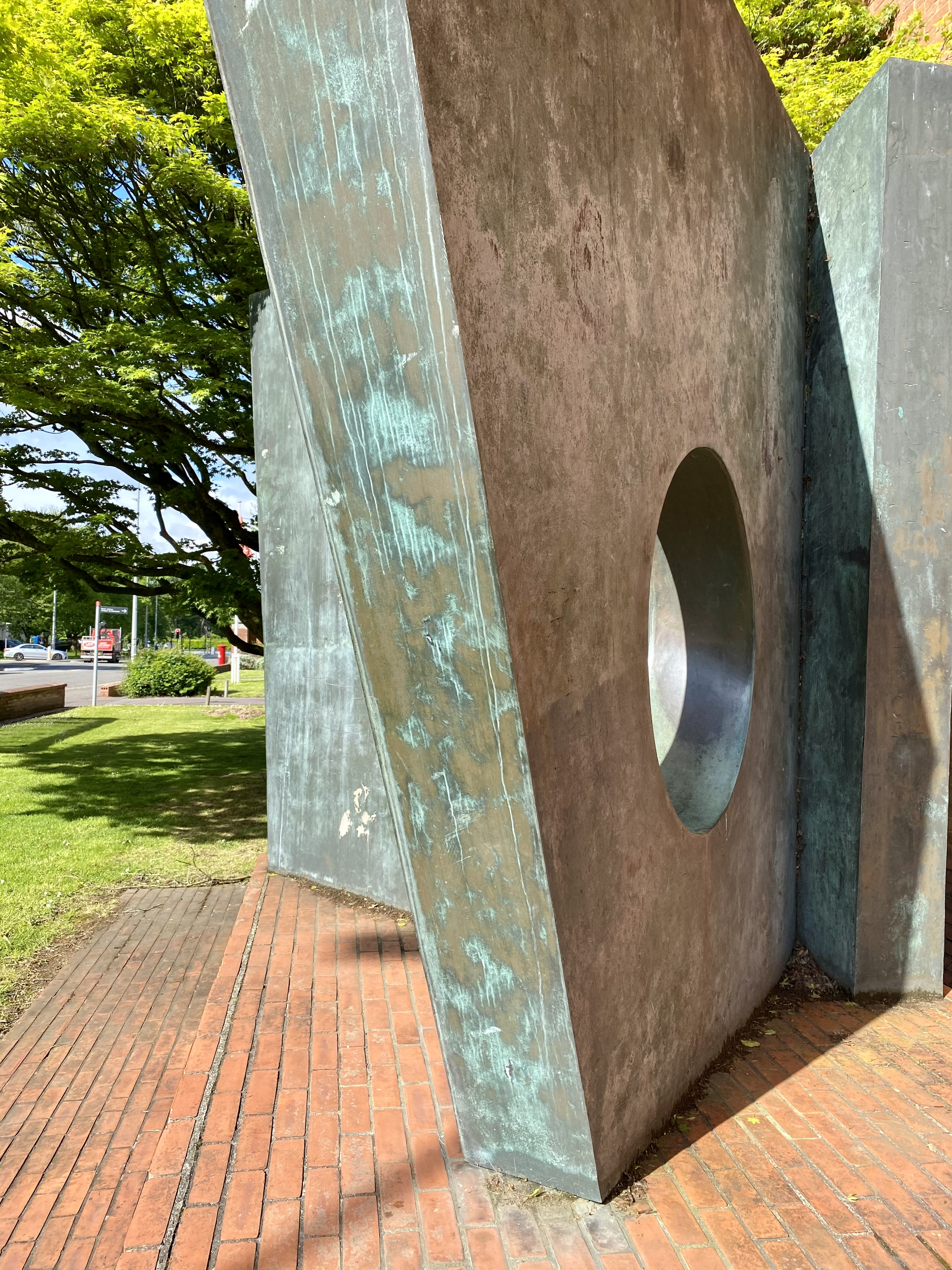

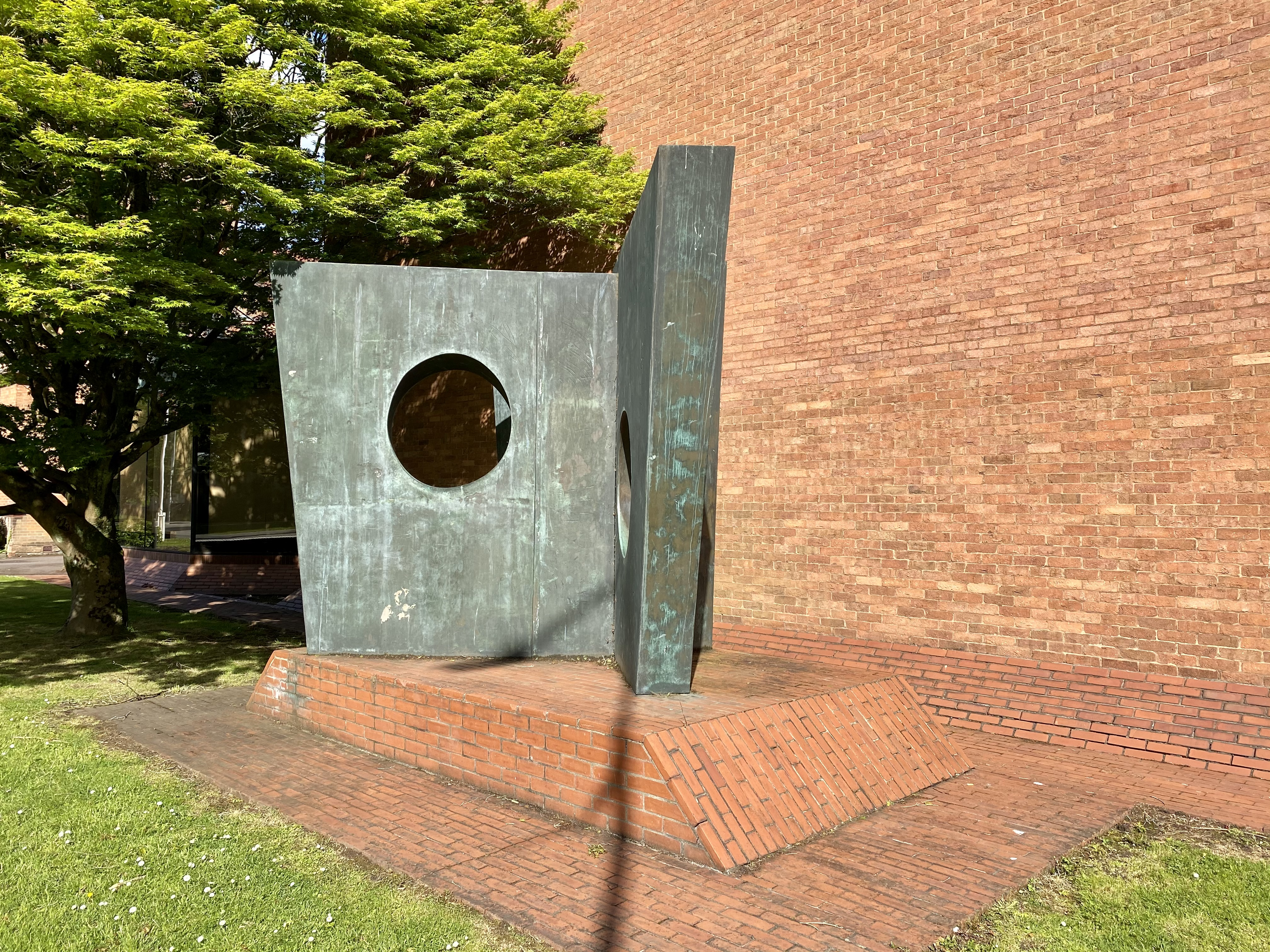

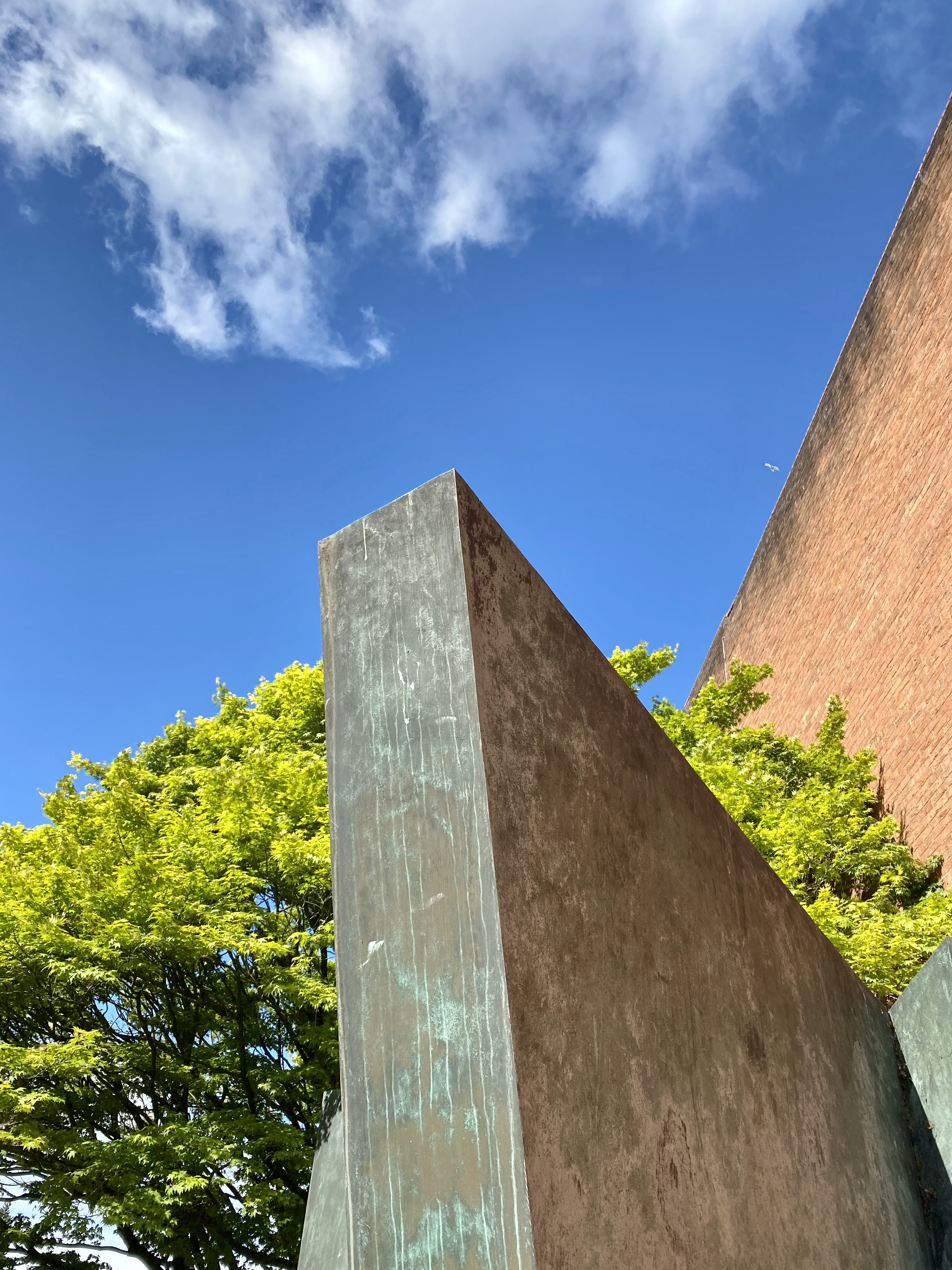
