= Cardiff University School of Music =

School of Cardiff University, Wales

Coordinates: 51.4894°N 3.1834°W

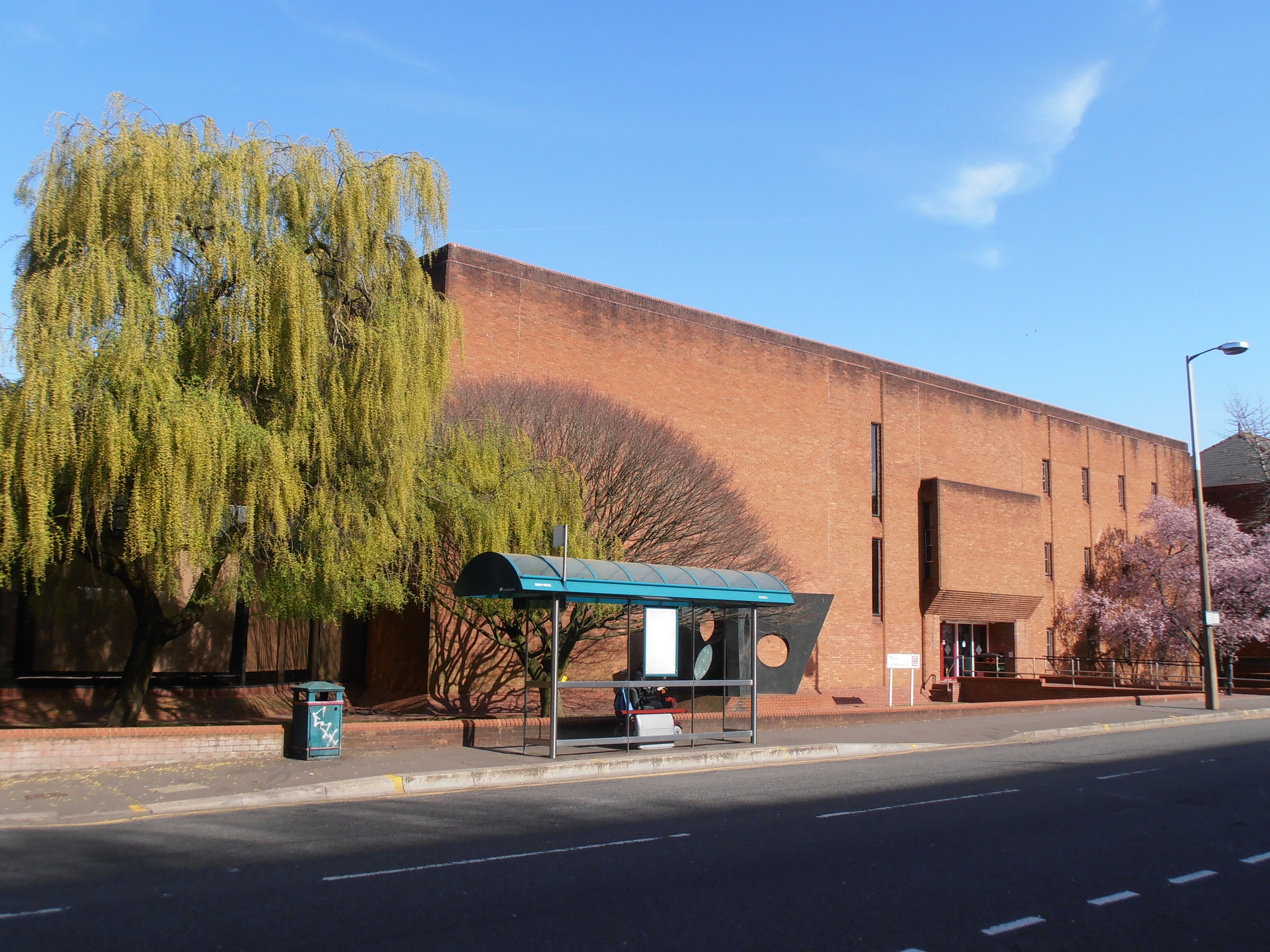
- Type: Public research university conservatory
- Established: 1883; 142 years ago
- Undergraduates: ~240 students
- Postgraduates: ~60 students
- Address: Corbett Road, CF10 3EB, Cardiff, Wales

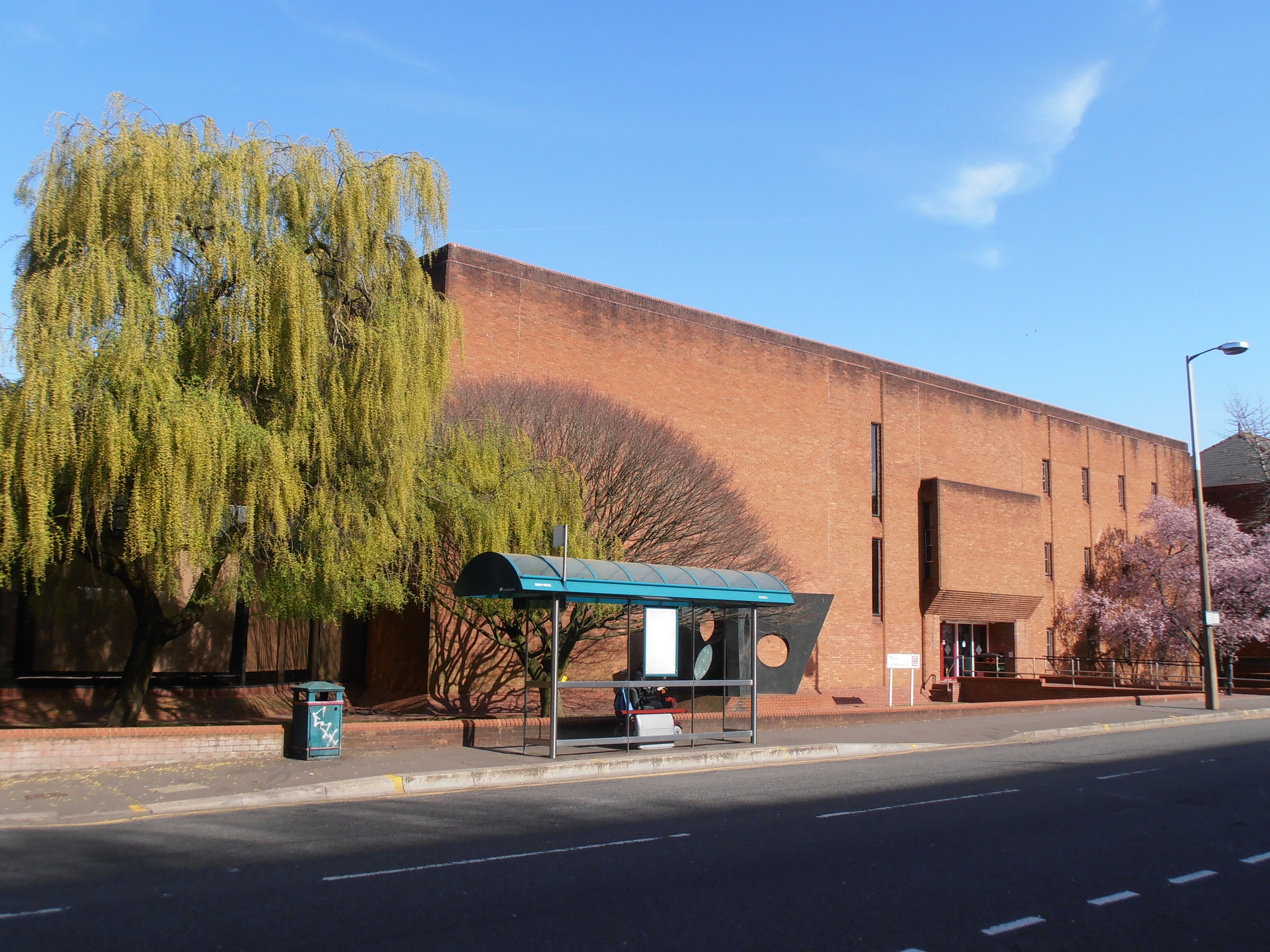
Music building

Cardiff University School of Music is a music department of Cardiff University and is located in Cardiff, Wales. It is home to about 240 undergraduate and 40 postgraduate students. It was one of the first departments established when Cardiff University was granted its Royal Charter in 1883. In the 2014 Research Excellence Framework, the School's was ranked 13th in the UK in the category Music, Drama, Dance and Performing Arts. Amongst music departments, The School ranked 2nd in the UK for quality of research environment and 8th in the UK for overall research excellence. The department holds close links with organisations such as BBC National Orchestra of Wales and Welsh National Opera.

Barbara Hepworth's 1968 monumental bronze sculpture Three Obliques (Walk In) is situated outside the school of music.

== Undergraduate degrees ==
Cardiff University School of Music offers the following undergraduate degree programmes:.

- BMus in Music
- BA in Music
- BA (Joint Honours)

== Postgraduate degrees ==
Cardiff University School of Music offers the following postgraduate degree programmes:

- MA in Music (with pathways in musicology, composition, performance, ethnomusicology, and popular music)
- PhD research programmes

== People ==
The current Head of School is Dr Nicholas Jones since 2023.

Former heads of school include Professor Kenneth Hamilton, Professor Rachel Cowgill, Professor David Wyn Jones, Professor Robin Stowell and Professor Adrian Thomas.

Notable alumni include several internationally acclaimed composers including Alun Hoddinott, who was head of the school from 1967 to 1989, Grace Williams, Karl Jenkins, Hilary Tann, and Philip Cashian, as well as Tony Woodcock (President of the New England Conservatory), pianist and accompanist Andrew Matthews-Owen and music scholar David Wyn Jones.

== Ensembles ==
The School of Music is home to numerous ensembles, including:

- Cardiff University Symphony Orchestra
- Cardiff University Symphony Chorus
- Cardiff University Chamber Orchestra
- Cardiff University Chamber Choir
- Contemporary Music Group
- Cardiff University Symphonic Winds
- Jazz Ensemble
- Lanyi West African Ensemble
- Nogo Abang Gamelan Ensemble

Several of these groups have released recordings. In 2020, the Symphony Orchestra released a recording of Michael Csányi-Wills' Symphony no. 1. The Contemporary Music Group, under Robert Fokkens, released Only Breath in 2019, featuring new choral music from Wales.

The school's ensembles have a history of international performance tours, including to Europe, China, Malaysia and Indonesia.
