= Godowsky =

Godowsky is a surname. Notable people with the surname include:

- Leopold Godowsky (1870–1938), Polish American pianist, composer, and teacher
- his daughter Dagmar Godowsky (1897–1975), American silent film actress
- his son Leopold Godowsky, Jr. (1900–1983), American violinist and chemist

Fictional characters:

- Rusty Godowsky, character in the film Myra Breckinridge
